= History of Maramureș =

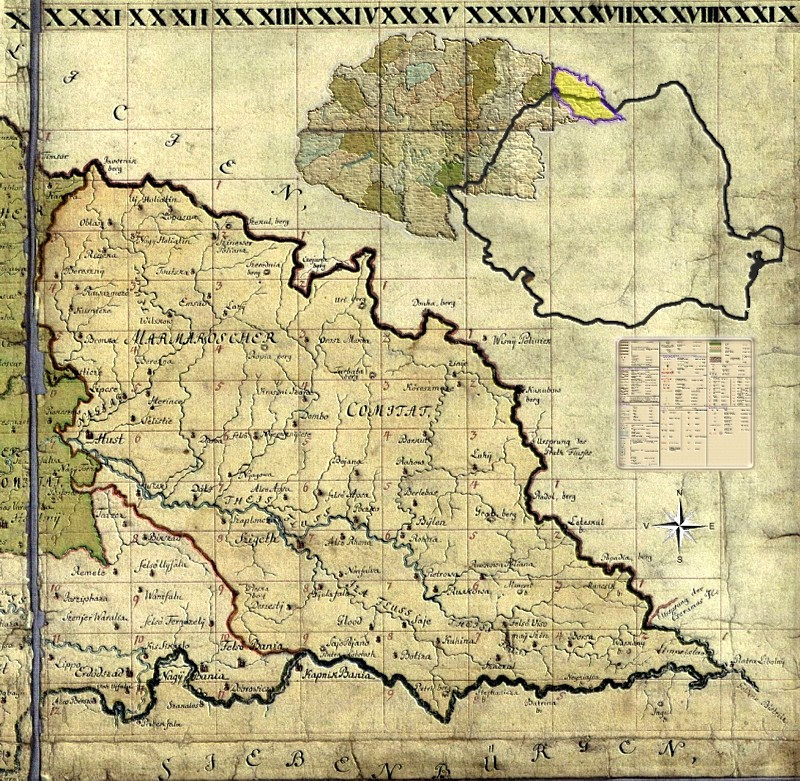
Máramaros County on the map of the Habsburg Kingdom of Hungary, 1780–84. The present-day borders of Romania are projected to the historical map.

Maramureș (in Romanian; Latin: Marmatia; Hungarian: Máramaros; Ukrainian: Мармарощина) is a historical region in the north of Transylvania, along the upper Tisa River. The territory of the southern part of this region is now in the Maramureș County in northern Romania, whereas its northern section is included in the Zakarpattia Oblast of western Ukraine.

== Prehistory ==
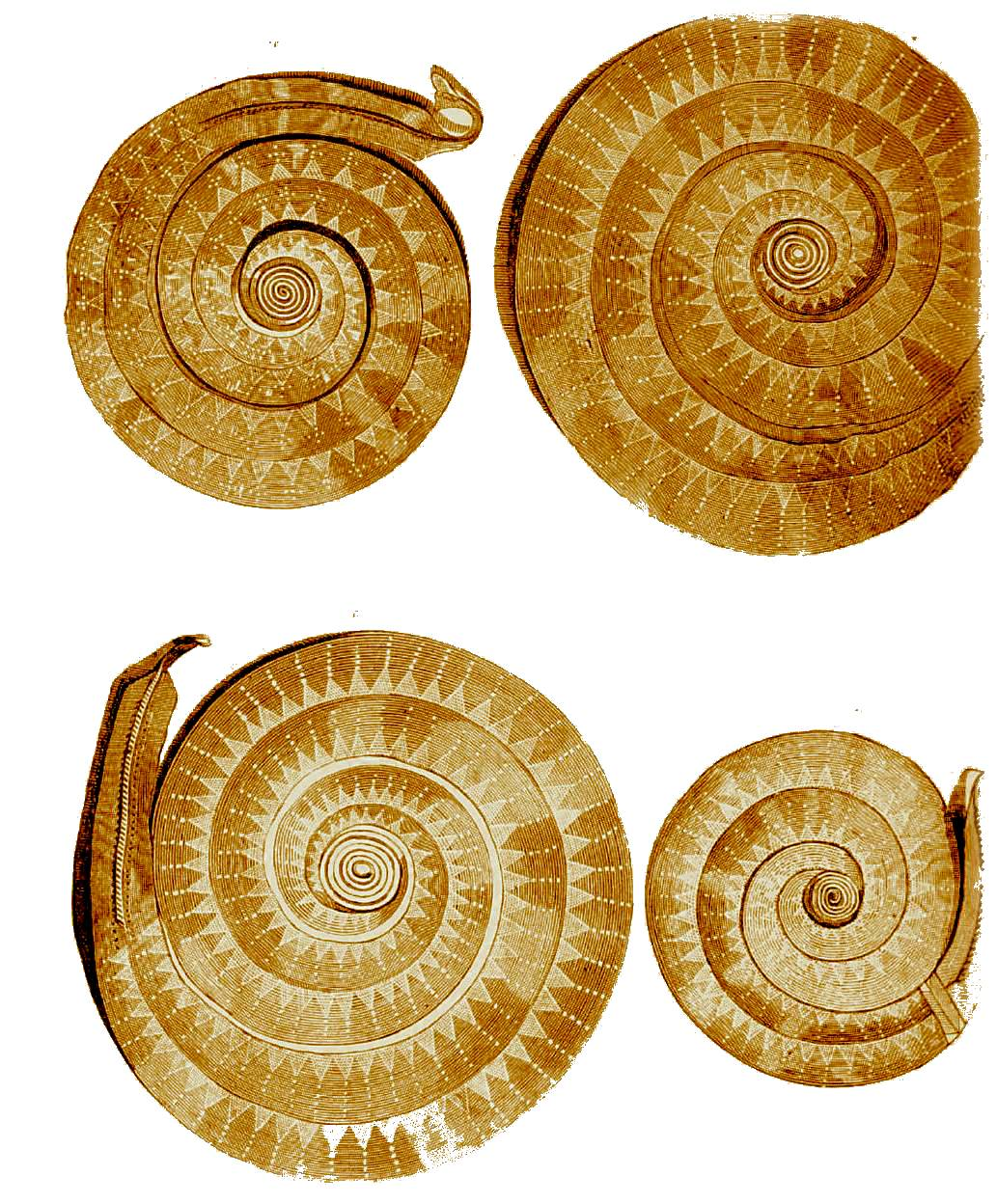
Prehistoric golden coils ornamented with intaglio lines and dots from Sighetu Marmației, Maramureș County, Romania.

There is evidence that the region of Maramureș was first settled in the Superior Paleolithic era. Archaeological discoveries of this primitive society have been uncovered in the Iza Valley near the village of Nănești.

Remnants from a Neolithic culture were discovered in many regions of Maramureș. Artifacts were found around Sighetu-Marmației, Costiui, Oncești, Cornești and Giulești. Some discoveries can be dated back to 6000 BC.

Traces of Mesolithic settlements, approximately 7000 years old, have been found near the villages of Camianitsa and Dibrova (Apșa de Jos) in Northern Maramureș and are considered among the oldest in Eastern Europe. Their inhabitants were hunter-gatherers, who lived during the winter in half-dug houses near the rivers and in the summer in aboveground huts. Using tools such as chisels, bows and arrows as well as harpoons, they worked stone and developed textured and glazed pottery and Ceramic. In a corner of their households they made clay kilns. The people of that period often moved their houses due to soil exhaustion. Cattle raising led to populating of mountain regions. The inhabitants of Maramureș from that period, together with those of nearby regions, belonged to the so-called Criş culture. Later, around 2000 BC, the migration of Indo-Europeans occurred. By the Bronze Age, the region of Maramureș was well settled, though due to the geography the population was quite sparse. Major archaeological discoveries have been found in more than twenty locations from the Bronze Age. This cultural establishment provides the first proof that the settlers of this region were of Geto-Dacian ancestry. During this time, the lands of Maramureș and much of modern Romania was the Kingdom of Dacia.

== Antiquity ==
Map of Roman Dacia (106-207 AD) showing Costoboci and Free Dacians in the Maramureș region

In antiquity, the region was governed by Thracian tribes, also known as Geto-Dacians. Around 300 BC - 200 BC, the migration of Celts brought Central Europe a more advanced technological culture. The second largest metallurgic center in Europe was located near Maramureș, at Galish-Lovachka, near the present town of Mukachevo. Apart from silver coins, over a thousand metal tools have been found there, such as scissors for cutting sheep wool scythes or swords and the remains of jewel workshops. The migration of the Celts also had negative effects. It gradually led to hostility between the Celts and the local Geto-Dacians. At the beginning of the 1st century BC, the latter, under King Burebista, defeated the Celts, forcing them to retreat to the territory of today's Germany. The Dacians during that period built their houses on higher banks of rivers, remains of which still exist at Cetatea (near Ocna Slatina). The salt from this town was also very valuable during that period.

In 107, the Roman province of Dacia Superior was established, with an initial northern boundary along the Someș River, later to be moved further north. Maramureș became a region immediately adjacent to the Roman province. Roman coins have been found throughout the region, such as those at Nankovo (1000 Roman silver coins), Brestovo (25 golden coins), Ruske Pole and Gaidoshi. The salt mine at Ocna Slatina, the metallurgical center at Zatiseanski (Djacovo, Vovchanske), as well as the largest pottery district in Eastern Europe (on the river Mits) were all located in the region.

Although the Roman administration retreated after 168 years, the Roman influence remained, due to the now linguistically Roman and ethnically Daco-Roman locals, who had become Christian.

A great migration reached the region at the end of the 4th century, when Huns came to the Panonian plains. By the middle of the 5th century, the Huns formed a major polity with its center between the rivers Danube and Tisza (?) under the control of the legendary Attilla. In 451, Attilla was defeated by a Roman-Visigoth alliance under the Roman general Aetius, which weakened his influence. While he made a comeback, attacking in the following year Italy itself and sacking Aquileia, Padua, Mantua, Verona and Brescia, and coming close to sacking Rome (saved, according to tradition, by the intervention of Pope Leo I), he died in 453. Soon after, his heirs were defeated by their rebellious subjects in the Battle of Nedao and the Hunnic empire disintegrated.

== Early Middle Ages ==
Different tribes, such as the Gepids, Vandals, Burgundians, Ostrogoths, Lombards and Slavs moved through the region of Maramureș. At the end of the 7th century, the whole region was under the Avar khanate. Before the coming of the Hungarians in 896, little is known regarding political control over the area.

The first groups of Slavs arrived nearby at the end of the 6th century, but they were not numerous. In the 8th century, however, a larger Slavic population followed. While some of the Slavs-Croatians soon migrated to the Balkan peninsula, those that remained populated the Pannonian territories immediately to the west of Maramureș. In the 9th century, the region bordered Velika Horvatia to the west and a small Slav dukedom, separating it from the much larger and stronger kingdom of Great Moravia. To the south, the region bordered the territory of Gelu, which was defeated in 904 by Hungarians. During this period, Slavs gradually converted to Christianity. In the 880s, disciples of Cyril and Methodius, expelled from Great Moravia, settled in the region immediately to the west of Maramureș and founded monasteries in inaccessible and beautiful mountain places.

In 896, the Hungarians arrived under their leader Álmos through the Verecke Pass (the valley of the river Latoritsa). In 903, under Arpad, they conquered the fortresses of Ungvár. In the 11th century, the Kingdom of Hungary extended its borders into Transylvania up to the crests of the Carpathian mountains. As with most border areas of the Kingdom of Hungary in the Middle Ages, this territory was purposefully left mostly unsettled as a deterrent to invaders: the territory is mentioned in chronicles of the time as part of the res nullis (no-man's land) or terra indagines (uninhabited defensive border land).

The social organization of Maramureș during the Middle Ages was also very specific. The people in many mountain villages, where each family had a considerable domain, were called free peasants. In Romanian-speaking areas, these were called nămeși [nameshi] or free peasants. The Romanian term indicates belonging to a small clan, from the Romanian neam (bigger old family). This term has been preserved to this day, both in the areas that remained Romanian and in those which later gradually became Slavic. Hungarian and German terms also existed for similar circumstances in Hungarian and German-settled areas.

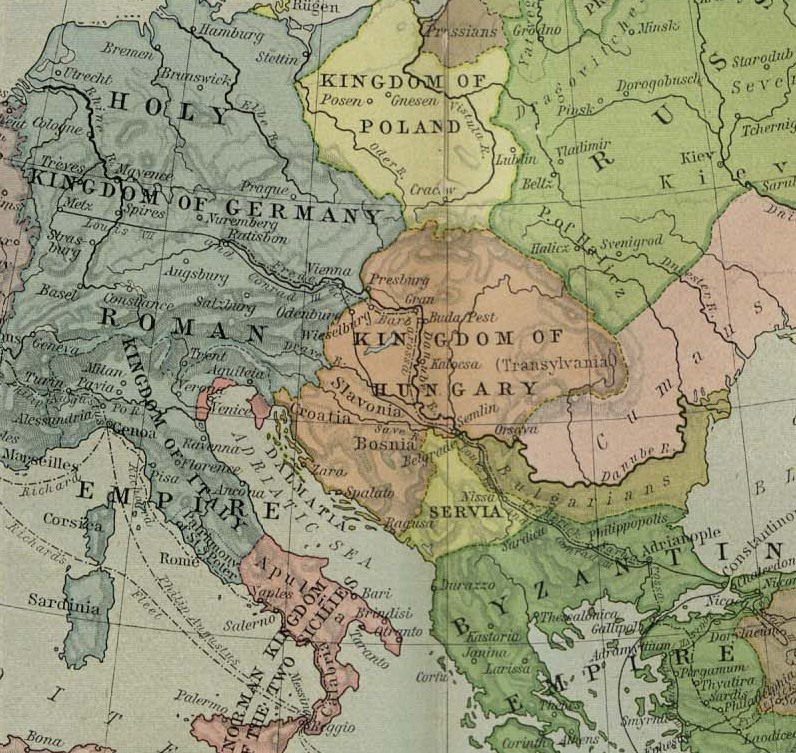
Kingdom of Hungary in 1190

In the 12th century, King Géza II of Hungary invited Saxons (Germans) from the Rhine regions to settle there.

Between the 12th and 15th centuries, Maramureș and surrounding areas were the source of an emigration. The Romanian population was gradually assimilated into new-coming Slavic populations, but sometimes strongly influenced the local culture. In the southeastern corner of modern Poland, where "lex vallachorum" was in force as late as the 16th century, or eastern Moravia, where their autonomy was devastated by Wallenstein during the Thirty Years' War.

In March 1241, the Tatar-Mongols under the Khan Batu overwhelmed the mountain defenses and entered through the Verecke Pass (separating the county of Bereg from Galicia) to plunder Transylvania and the Kingdom of Hungary. They destroyed many towns and monasteries, killing up to half the population. Hungarian villages, being mostly in the valleys, bore the greatest brunt of the slaughter, and this helped start the decline in Hungarian population that influenced the modern political disposition of the territory. The Mongols destroyed the towns of Teceu (Técső then) and Ocna Slatina (Aknaszlatina then) as well as the surrounding villages. In 1242, they hastily retreated, after learning that the Great Khan had died, in order to back their leader Batu to become the new Great Khan.

== 1241–1526 ==
In 1245, the Hungarian king Béla IV invited grape-growers and wine-makers from Italy and Germany to settle in the places destroyed by the Tatars.

Like other border regions, portions of Maramureș became a settled part of the Kingdom of Hungary later than other areas. The depopulated border regions began to be settled, in this case by both Vlach and native Hungarians, well after the Mongol Invasion of Batu Khan (1241). It was designated a county in 1303, and its territory reached the crest of the Carpathian Mountains. Prior to this time, it had been described only as (uninhabited) "forest."

In the 13th century, the nearby counties of Ung, Bereg and Ugocsa were temporarily ceded to the Halic-Volyn Principality, but returned to Hungary in 1308 under the new Anjou dynasty. The three counts - Petk of Ung, Kopasz of Bereg and Moish of Ugocsa - opposed the return to Hungary and restoration of the local population to the Catholic Church. They plotted to install Iuri, the son of Prince Lev Danilovich of Halic and the grandson of Béla IV, as king of Hungary. But King Carol Robert of Anjou, with the help of the counts Drughezzi from Italy, prevailed.

Anjou's military and diplomatic tenacity was soon to be tested by Maramureș as well. In the middle of the 14th century, the nobility of Maramaros, while still jealously guarding their rights at home, were an important catalyst in uniting the lands to the east of the Carpathian Mountains and forming the Moldavian Principality. Nobles from Maramaros lent large numbers of knights (called 'vitéz' in Hungarian) who were called and 'viteji' by the grateful Moldavians. This is the source of Moldavia's first and most famous dynasty, the Mușatins. One of the major participants in these events was the count of Maramaros Bogdan of Cuhea, who succeeded in 1342 and again in 1349, in totally eliminating the royal authority from Maramureș, only to find his efforts thwarted by the superior diplomatic ability of King Louis of Hungary over the lesser local (Romanian) nobility. In 1349, documents mentioning "Ioan, son of Iuga, voevod of Romanians from Maramureș" and "Nicolae, son of Petru", addressed to king Louis of Anjou regarding the rights of a certain "Giula, son of Darius" over the villages of Giulești and Nireş.

Bogdan's failure in Maramureș prompted him to remove his forces to Moldavia in June 1359. This left many of his villages with only defenseless peasants. In Moldavia, the arriving forces drove out Balc and Drag, grandsons of the legendary voevod Dragoș, loyal vassals of the king of Hungary. As captains of the easternmost military mark, they had been organizing the defense against the Tatars on the eastern slopes of the Carpathians. When their reconciliation with Bogdan failed and the latter was able to gather sufficient support in Moldavia to gain independence both from Hungary and from Poland, Louis endowed Balc and Drag with the lands that Bogdan held in Maramureș and made them Voevods of the Vlachs, but this time vassals of the King. Documenting this in 1365, Louis ensured that the historic Kingdom of Hungary established its border along the crests of the Carpathians, a line preserved until the end of World War I.

For over 30 years, Balc and Drag developed Maramureș, opening it economically and culturally to the outside world. They were sole administrators of over 30 villages. Most of them were in the northern half of Maramureș including the towns of Khust and Sighet and the salt mine at Slatina (the mine has been productive since pre-Roman times). For the rest of the Voevodate/County (both names were used throughout their reign in the 14th century) lesser lords were their vassals or nameși. Over the centuries, due mainly to wise diplomacy on the part of the Hungarian kings, Maramureș accepted its place as a county within the Kingdom of Hungary. The local nobility adopted the Hungarian language and intermarried with the Hungarian nobility from other regions of Transylvania, some of whom were actually of Romanian descent.

In 1215, two monks, Romulus and Ghenadius, left the Monastery of Râmeț ("Little Rome") in the Alba district in south Transylvania to found the Monastery of the Saint Archangel Michael of Peri. In 1391, the orthodox Patriarch of Constantinople Antonius IV transformed this monastery into a Partiarchal Stavropighia with jurisdiction over eight counties: Maramureș, Ugocsa, Bereg, Ung, Árva, Ciceu, Sălaj and Bihorian Almaș. Different sources mention two different people as the first bishop - "Simon the Moldavian" by some and "ehumen Pahonius, a relative of the voevods" by others.

The bishopric became the earliest non-rural Romanian bishopric, after the bishoprics of Tomis and Durustorum, continued south of the Danube since Roman times. The monastery was the cultural and religious center of the northern half of Transylvania for over 300 years. Its monks produced the oldest known texts in the Romanian language (three different documents, apparently all written in 1391), as well as chronicles that served as sources for 17th and 18th century scholars of the Romanian renascence. In the 17th century, the monastery became an important typographic center. The monastery was burned down during an anti-Habsburg uprising of Hungarian Protestants in 1703, who retreated into the region and employed scorched earth tactics.

The village of Peri (Grushevo) is situated on the right bank of the river Tisza, in what is today Northern Maramureș, between Apșa de Jos to the east, Teresva (also spelled Taras in older sources) to the west, Strâmtura to the north, all three currently in Ukraine and Săpânța, currently in Romania, to the south, on the opposite side of the river.

The oldest document mentioning Sighet, the capital of Maramureș, dates to 1326. In 1334, papal lists mention a "Benedict, paroh of Sighet." In 1346, Benedict is mentioned as "rector eclesie Zygeth". In 1329, King Carol Robert gave the status of seats of "royal guests" to four towns of Maramureș: Vyshkovo, Khust, Teceu and Câmpulung. On 19 February 1352, King Louis I extended these urban privileges to Sighet. In 1385, the city of Sighet is mentioned as "county siege, where documents are emitted", and in 1397, a document of the Dragoș family mentions "villa noastra libera ... Zyget". The towns of Hust and Teceu also gained in importance during that time. Masons, tailors, bakers, carpenters, barbers, potters, smiths, goldsmiths and cartwrighters are mentioned. In 1472, a diploma of Matei Corvin reaffirms the urban privileges of Sighet.

In 1343, the Romanian Voivodeship of Maramureș is established, lasting until 1402.

Many of the larger villages of Maramureș date from the same period: Slatina (1360), Apșa de Jos (1387), Apșa de Mijloc (1406) and Biserica Alba (1373). At the end of the 15th century, there were 128 towns and villages in Maramureș (compared with 205 in nearby Ung, 122 in Bereg and 76 in Ugocsa). The combined population in 1500 is estimated by historians at 30,000 to 60,000. Many villages are mentioned in the 15th century as nameși villages, i.e. inhabited by free peasants: Lipcia, Iza, Dolha, Dragova, Bedevlea, Vyshkovo, Vilihivtsi, Criceva, Ciumaleva, Uglea, Colodne, Vonigova in the north Vyshkovo is even mentioned as a town sometimes.

In 1514, the uprising of the cross-curutz peasants under Derdi Doji conquered Hust, the "gate of Maramureș", but did not encroach further into the region.

== 1526–1690 ==
In 1526, at the Battle of Mohács, Hungary was defeated by the Ottomans and King Lajos II, the last of the Jagiellon dynasty, died in battle. Most of the Pannonian plains were subsequently occupied by Turks and the western and northern Kingdom of Hungary passed to the Austrian Habsburgs, while Transylvania, including Maramureș, became an autonomous principality within the Ottoman Empire from 1541. Petru Rareș of Moldavia attempted to take the area over in 1527–1538 and later Mihai Viteazul of Wallachia tried the same in 1600–1601. Most notably, the Austrian Habsburgs tried it for the whole duration of the autonomous principality (1527) until they finally absorbed it in 1687.

In 1551, Sighet's rights to hold fairs were reaffirmed. Also in 1551, the first ever strike in the Kingdom of Hungary took place, when the miners of Ocna Slatina left their workplace and created a makeshift tent camp at Baia Mare, demanding improvement of their working conditions and annulment of the death penalty.

In the 16th century, Lutheran and Reformed Calvinist movements took hold in Transylvania, especially among the Hungarian nobility. In 1556, the Catholic Church in Sighet, together with the majority of believers, was taken over by the Protestants. Later they also opened a confessional school there.

With the help of Transylvanian Saxons, a Romanian Orthodox monk from Moldavia printed the first Romanian language text entitled "the Lutheran Catechism" in 1544. During the 1550s and 1560s, a whole series of propaganda appeared. On November 30, 1566, the Protestant-dominated Sibiu Diet decided to "extirpate the idolatry, especially from among the Romanian peasants". During the reigns of the Zapolai princes in 1526–1571 over different parts of the disintegrating Kingdom of Hungary, the Protestant nobility of Transylvania and the Catholic Austria often clashed, with the latter slowly gaining the upper hand.

The pro-independence policy of the Romanian gentry and Hungarian nobility provoked an Ottoman invasion in 1566. The principality was plundered, but its remote location saved Maramureș. The region was similarly protected from the devastations during and in the aftermath of the 1604–1606 and 1678–1685 Hungarian anti-Habsburg uprisings. The 16th and 17th centuries also saw the rise of haiduc movements - self-organized small detachments that attacked the rich and distributed the bounty among the poor.

From the 16th century, with the consent of the Hungarian nobility and later with that of the Habsburgs, the mountain regions separating Panonia from Galicia were subject to the Galician colonization: Lemki settled in the Ung, Zempeln and Saros counties, Boiki - in Bereg and Ung, while Hutsuls - in northeastern Maramureș.

The period from the end of the 15th century to end of the 18th century also saw the gradual migration of Ruthenians from Bereg to the northwest of Maramureș, mostly by intermarriage with local Vlachs.

In 1611, Emperor Leopold of Austria allowed Sighet to have its own coat-of-arms: an Aurochs' head.

In the 17th century, the Romanian Orthodox Church of Transylvania was moved by the Diet to the jurisdiction of the Reformed (Calvinist) Church. A Calvinist superintendent was named on April 9, 1639 to oversee the conversion of Romanians from Orthodoxy to Calvinism. Many leaders of the Romanian Church (which opposed these moves) such as the metropolitans Dosoftei, Ghenadie II, Ilie Iorest and Sava Brâncovici (the latter two were later canonized by the Romanian Orthodox Church) were persecuted, imprisoned or sometimes killed by the Transylvanian governments of princes, such as Gabriel Bethlen or Georgy Rakoczi.

In 1641, the Ruthenian Orthodox Bishop of Munkach in Bereg, the region immediately to the west of Maramureș, converted to Catholicism. On April 24, 1646, 63 Ruthenian Orthodox clerics from nearby Ung, Bereg and Ugocsa counties proclaimed the Uzhhorod Union with Catholicism, founding the Ruthenian Greek-Catholic Church. In 1689, Pope Alexander VIII officially recognized the union. This led to open conflict with Báthory princes, who were Reformed Protestants. In 1689–1706, the Catholic Bishop of Munkach was a Greek, Iosif Camillis, who managed to take over some Orthodox parishes in northern Transylvania and obtained authority among others over some parts of Maramureș, especially over the largely Ruthenian villages of the region. In total, 140 Ruthenian and Romanian parishes were under the authority of the Bishop of Munkach. Later, in 1853, the Romanian ones separated and formed the Bishopric of Gherla.

The Romanian bishops of Maramureș, together with the monks of the Maramureș hermitages ("schituri"), trying to preserve orthodoxy, started a revival movement aimed at the local priests and at the population. Their aim was to uphold "that the language, traditions and religious we hold link us with neighboring Moldavia." To counterbalance the Catholic proselytism, the Romanian clergy of Maramureș elected Iosif Stoica from Criciova, a widowed priest who became a monk, then bishop. He was raised to this rank in 1690 by the metropolitan Dosoftei of Moldavia. An antimis (religious text), dated by Iosif Stoica in 1692 and preserved to this day, is signed "din mila lui Dumnezeu, Episcop Ortodox al Maramureșului, exarh al Stavropighiei Patriarhale Constantinopolitane, locțiitor al Mitropoliei din Bâlgrad din Ardeal", the title of the Bishopric of Peri. Stoica is known to have travelled throughout the region, often to Khust. The Hungarian historian Nicolae Bethlen, former chancellor of Transylvania during that period, has noted that Iosif Stoica wrote a letter opposing union with the Roman Church, based on arguments from the Scriptures and the writings of the Church fathers. Bethlen noted his surprise that a rural Romanian was able to produce "a letter of such theological strength."

After serving as bishop for 15 years, Iosif Stoica was forced to sign a 20-point program in 1705. It imposed strong restrictions to orthodoxy and to the Romanian character of the faith. However, when Iosif Stoica refused to sign, he was arrested and imprisoned in Khust, allegedly with the support of Iosif Camillis, who wanted to name as vicar of Sighet a Catholic, Gheorghe Ghenadie Bizanezi. The priests and parishioners of Maramureș protested in vain, demanding the release of their bishop. They elected a new bishop, Iov Țârca from Gâmbuţ, who after a few years of persecutions and accusations fled to Moldavia. He was then condemned to death for his activities in defending the Church. After being released in 1711, Iosif Stoica continued to exercise his episcopal functions without the knowledge of the authorities. He tried to recover his bishopric officially, but died in the same year. For his piety and activities in defending the traditional Romanian faith, he was revered by the believers from Maramureș along with the saints, and later, in 1992, the Romanian Orthodox Church canonized him. His saint's day is April 24.

The next bishop, Ștefan Serafim Petrovan, was a person easily swayed. He was ready to turn to Catholicism, but was prevented in this by the Calvinist Hungarian nobility. Romanian-Orthodox sources claim that the attempt to convert the Maramureș Romanians to Catholicism "were met with dignified and solemn protests against being united against their will and against introduction of innovations contradicting their old law and beliefs."

In the 17th century, Maramureș became renowned for the so-called "girl fairs" ("târguri de fete") where, in addition to activities common to classical fairs, people gathered to meet and marry. Due to extensive cutting of woods, by 1631 the cutting of fir trees for cork to transport the salt was limited. At the same time, nuts, apples, mulberries, corn and clover became sources of revenue. Maramureș also became renowned for its wood and iron works - Vyshkovo, Criva, Buștina, Bocicoiu Mare, furnaces and casting - Kosivska Poliana, Butfalva, timber - Frăsini, Bocicoiu Mare, Gura Ciornei, shoe factories - Khust. Cliff caves were used to heat mineral water, creating the first spas. The towns of Vyshkovo, Teceu, Khust and others remained owned by the county government, unlike the surrounding regions, where many towns and cities became private property or central state property.

== 1690–1918 ==
The last incursion of the Ottomans into Central Europe proved disastrous to them. In 1683, the Austrians and the Poles defeated the Ottomans at the gates of Vienna. Within seven years, they also conquered Buda, Transylvania and abolished the principality. In 1699, in the Treaty of Karlovitz, the Ottomans officially renounced Transylvania in favour of Austria. In Transylvania, Catholic and Protestant efforts to convert the population resulted in open clashes. Concurrently, the Transylvanian nobility was becoming Magyarized, a process virtually completed by the 16th century, when Calvinism was adopted. After granting autonomy to Catholics Szekely and new Lutherans Saxons, the nobility formed with them "The Union of The Three Nations", a statute aimed at concentrating all the power in the principality in the hands of the three nations: Hungarian (Calvinist nobles), (Catholic) Szekelies and (Lutheran) Saxons. (Orthodox) Romanians, representing the vast majority of the population, were left with no representation, except the voice they could have through their clergy. Understanding that the religious pressure from all sides would not cease, a part of the Romanian-Orthodox clergy prepared to compromise with the side that would prove more flexible to the needs of the Romanians.

Linguistic and cultural affinities, as well as the much greater flexibility shown by the Catholic Church paid off for the latter. In 1692, Orthodox Bishop Teofil Seremi was established as the Metropolitan of Alba Iulia, as usual under the Calvin dependency. After discussions and negotiations through the Jesuit Ladislau Baranyi, Seremi convoked a synod. On March 21, 1697, the synod decided to unite the Church with Rome under the conditions of the Council of Florence, similarly to the unions of Brest and Muncach of the Ruthenians. The intention was that the Romanian clergy would receive the same rights and immunities as the Latin clergy, while preserving the traditional establishments and the mass. On April 4, 1697, the imperial chancellor Franz Ulrich Kinsky presented the Romanians' request to the governor of Transylvania Georgy Bánffy in Vienna and the imperial approval of the document. The Church was left under existing Calvinist control. Teofil Seremi died in July 1697, presumably by poisoning.

The ambiguity of the situation at the time was emphasized by the next Metropolitan of Transylvania, Atanasie Anghel. He received his ordination as Orthodox Metropolitan of Bucharest, where prince Constantin Brancoveanu of Wallachia had arranged for official instruction to be given to the new metropolitan by Dositei, the Orthodox Patriarch of Jerusalem. As soon as the Catholics started to realize the promised concessions, the 1697 union gained strength. In response to the July 2, 1698 confirmation of the 1697 privileges by Cardinal Kollonich of Esztergom, Atanasie Anghel summoned a new synod, which passed a "Manifest of Union" on October 7, 1698, signed by 38 high representatives of the Romanian clergy of Transylvania. In 1700, Brancoveanu presented the Romanian Orthodox Metropolitan of Alba Iulia with a substantial financial contribution which he retracted the next year, after a new synod in 1700 validated the union. In 1701, Anghel travelled to Vienna and declared the Metropolitan province of Transylvania was no longer subordinate to Bucharest. Dositei, the Patriarch of Jerusalem and Teodosie, the Metropolitan of Bucharest, presented Anghel with a formal anathema.

In 1700, the Maramureș county congregation decided that the parochial school at Sighet had to be supported with public money.

In 1703, there was a Hungarian uprising against Austria and Catholicism, led by Ferenc Rakoczi. Some Romanians, Ruthenians and Slovaks participated. On June 7, 1703 the kuruc won an inconclusive battle against Austrians at Dolha, but were subsequently defeated, although definitively only in 1711. During this uprising, the Hungarian Protestants plundered and destroyed the famous Monastery of Peri in 1703.

After the union, Anghel's difficulties continued. The Calvin intendant was replaced by a Jesuit theologist, Gabriel Hevenessi, whose aggressiveness and absence of diplomacy, according to contemporaries, were surpassed only by his zeal to censure the books printed at Alba Iulia. The support from Wallachia was now completely cut. Due to the Hungarian revolt, the support from Vienna was minimal. In 1707, Rakoczy occupied Alba Iulia and Anghel had to retreat with the imperial troops to Sibiu. In Alba Iulia, the Bishop of Maramureș Iov Tarca, the former counter-candidate of Atanasie Anghel for the metropolitan see, re-established the Romanian Orthodox metropolitan province of Transylvania, with himself as Metropolitan, but was forced to flee to Maramureș, when the city passed again into Austrian hands.

In 1711, Atanasie Anghel, frustrated by the absence of imperial support, again voided the union with Rome, but was dissuaded by the Jesuits, when they finally managed to obtain support from the Emperor. Anghel died in 1713, but it took until December 23, 1715 until the Emperor approved another bishop, Ioan Giurgiu Patachi. Simultaneously, due to major reconstruction in Alba Iulia and resulting demolition of many old buildings, the metropolitan see was moved to Făgăraș. After approval by a papal decree "Indulgentum esse" (1716) and papal bull "Rationi Congruit" (1721), Patachi was festively installed in his position at the "St. Nicolas" Cathedral in Fagaraș on August 17, 1723.

In 1717, the Tatars invaded Maramureș and plundered the wealth of Sighet, much of which was hidden in the reformed church. After bringing much disaster, the Tatars were annihilated in a battle at Cavnic, where a monument was erected to commemorate the battle. Also, commemorating the battle, a traditional costume is worn during the Christmas period, when the battle was fought, known today under the name of Brondosi.

The adversaries of the Greek-Catholic Church inside the imperial territory were the Protestant nobility of Transylvania, but also the Serbian Orthodox Metropolitan of Karlowitz. The latter's emissary to Transylvania, the Romanian monk Visarion Sarai, succeeded in spontaneously gathering so much support among the locals that it terrified the Austrian authorities. After arresting him, they sent him to the fearful Kufstein prison in Tirol, where he vanished.

The person who was instrumental in establishing the national right of Romanians in Transylvania and forming the union with Rome was the Romanian Greek-Catholic Bishop of Blaj Inocențiu Micu-Klein. Schooled by the Jesuits in Cluj, trained in theology in Trnava and later a Basilian monk, he was appointed in 1729 by Emperor Charles VI Bishop of Alba Iulia and Fagaraș. He was also awarded the titles of Imperial Counsellor and Baron as well as given a seat in the Transylvanian Diet. In 1737, he moved the bishopric seat from Făgăraș to Blaj and in 1741 laid the foundations of the local cathedral. As a member of the Diet, Micu began to press the Habsburg monarchy to fulfill the agreement that conversion to Greek Catholicism would bring with it privileges such as were accorded Roman Catholics and an end to serfdom. First pressing for rights for the clergy and the converts, he soon began to petition for freedom for all Romanians. Micu petitioned the Habsburg court for over forty years to this end. His perseverance ultimately caused both Empress Maria Theresa and the Transylvanian Diet to declare themselves offended. The Diet itself opposed the liberation of the work force or the awarding of political rights to Romanians, considered by the Diet as "moth for the cloth." Exiled in 1744 and forced to give up his bishopric in 1751, Micu died in Rome in 1768.

A visit by the Catholic Bishop Manuil Olsavszky of Muncach, travelling as official envoy of Empress Maria Theresa throughout Transylvania, revealed that the union was in name only and that the locals did not want to receive uniate priests, but demanded that Klein be brought back. Fearing the situation could get much worse, Maria Theresa produced an Edict of Tolerance towards the Orthodox believers on July 13, 1759. It forbade the uniate clergy to persecute them. Two petitions were sent in March 1791 and March 1792 by the leaders of the ethnic Romanians of Transylvania to Emperor Leopold II, demanding equal political rights with the other ethnicities of Transylvania and a share of the Transylvanian Diet proportional to their population (two third). Partially modelled on revolutionary France Declaration of the Rights of Man and of the Citizen, the Supplex Libellus Valachorum Transsilvaniae (Petition of the Vlachs of Transylvania) documents were drafted by clerics of the Romanians Greek Catholic Church. Rejected, except for the point referring to the free practice of the Orthodox faith, despite the quasi-total support by the population, the document became the rallying point of the Romanians of Transylvania until after World War I.

In the 18th century, Maramureș was known for the export of salt, fur, wine and wooden crafts, while importing jewelry, carpets (from Turkey and the Balkans), fabric, crystal, china (from Bohemia, Germany and Italy) and iron crafts (from Holland and Poland). Buștina, Veliky Bicichiv, Vâșcova, Teceu, Hust, Rahau, Ocna Slatina, Taras, Yasinia, Dolha, Borșa and Sighet were the regional towns that emerged during that period. Hust was hosting as many as ten annual fairs.

The 19th century brought economic growth to Maramureș, although the first factories had appeared two centuries earlier. Electricity, post and telephone service reached the region by the end of the century.

During 1870–1913, there was considerable migration to the USA. From Maramureș, Ugocea, Bereg and Ung combined, there were 180,000 legal and up to 400,000 illegal emigrants to the USA. A smaller number of people emigrated to Uruguay, Canada, Argentina and Australia.

In 1900, Ioan Mihalyi de Apșa printed the first volume of the history of the County of Maramureș, "Maramureș Diplomas of XIV – XV centuries", at Sighet.

With the beginning of World War I, Russian troops invaded Yasinea and Rahiv in northeastern Maramureș in September 1914. They were repelled, but at the end of October 1914, while pushing towards Uzhoc, they invaded also the northeast-most villages of Maramureș, around Studene and were again repelled. No further military action took place in Maramureș.

== November 1918–March 1919 ==
At the end of World War I, the Austria-Hungary empire dissolved. The nations comprising it elected national and/or regional assemblies to determine future political configurations. At this time, Maramureș County was divided into North and South. The Great National Assembly of Alba Iulia, composed of 1,228 elected members, has decided on December 1, 1918 in Alba Iulia upon their union with Romania.

On December 15, 1918, in Mediaș, the Council of the Transylvanian Saxons and Danubian Swabians (ethnic Germans that had moved to Transylvania in the 12th-13th, respectively in the 18th centuries) decided to support the Romanians, mainly because of their adversity to the prospect of having to live in a Hungarian national state, which was due to the Magyarization policy practiced in the Transleithanian part of Austria-Hungary after 1870 up to World War I. The remaining Hungarians (24%-26% of population of Transylvania) as a whole were opposed to this move, claiming to be best represented by the Transleithanian Government in Budapest.

Southern Maramureș, as well as Romanian villages from the north of the river Tisza, around the town of Ocna Slatina, elected deputies to the Great National Assembly.

In November and December 1918, various "Councils" were established in different cities of Carpathian Ruthenia, the region inhabited by Ruthenians, spanning over most parts of the former counties of Ung, Bereg, Ugocea and the northern part of Maramureș, in order for inhabitants to decide which state they wished to join.

Uzhhorod, Mukachevo, Berehovo and other cities voted to join the new Hungarian Republic. On January 21, 1919, Khust and Svalyava voted to join Ukraine. A Hutsul Republic was declared in Yasinia on January 8, 1919. A vote was taken by the National Council of American Ruthenians, in which Czechoslovakia won as the most popular home for the region. This vote served as a basis point for the proposals of the Triple Entente regarding the future of Carpathian Ruthenia.

The Czechoslovak delegation at the Conference of the Treaty of Versailles insisted that the northern half of Maramureș be combined with Carpathian Ruthenia, based on the fact that the August 17, 1916 Treaty (article 4) between Romania and the powers of the Entante (Britain, France, Russia and Italy) precluding the entrance of Romania in World War I, stipulated Romania's right to Austria-Hungarian territory inhabited by Romanians up to the river Tisza. The Romanian delegation was opposed to this because the river Tisza divided Maramureș County roughly in half and the Romanians inhabiting the right bank of the Tisza had also taken part in the election of representatives to the Great National Assembly of Alba Iulia. These MPs voiced concern during the Assembly upon the incorrect usage of the phrase "up to Tisza" by some speakers as a figure of speech and were assured that de jure the Assembly was representing the population of the administrative units of Austria-Hungary from which they had been elected.

After prolonged negotiations at the Conference of the Treaty of Versailles, the Romanian delegation convinced the Triple Entente powers to accept the decision of the Assembly. The Romanian Army subsequently moved into Transylvania during the spring and summer of 1919. Four independent field Commissions, one each from Britain, France, USA and Italy, submitted proposals for the future border of Romania in Transylvania. The consolidated proposal suggested that the westernmost Counties (parts of Crișana/Partium) be retained by Hungary and one County in the southwest (part of Banat) to be attributed to the newly formed Yugoslavia.

== March 1919–April 1920 ==
An ambiguous period ensued from March to May 1919 as a "Diet" government for Carpathian Ruthenia formed with strong ties to Hungary's Béla Kun (communist) regime.

Throughout the summer of 1919, Czech troops began to control most of what is today Carpathian Ruthenia, with Romanian troops gaining control of its southern regions in late spring at the request of the Versailles Conference, against the Communist Hungarian Republic.

In June 1919, independently from the ongoing events in Versailles, the Romanian and Czechoslovak armies agreed on a demarcation line which left Ung and most of the Bereg County under Czechoslovak control, while Maramureș, Ugocsa and part of the Bereg County fell under Romanian control, until the final decisions at Versailles were made.

On July 2, 1919, the Prime Minister of Romania, Ion C. Brătianu, withdrew from the Versailles Conference because the Entente powers wanted to stick to the letter of the 1916 treaty with respect to Maramureș, i.e. to divide the county. This created tension between the Romanian Delegation and the Supreme Council at Versailles.

On August 3, 1919, the Entente powers finally accepted the Czechoslovak suggestion. Brătianu refused to sign the treaty in that form. The Romanians wanted to preserve the June demarcation line as the official border.

In Transylvania, there was some public anxiety about keeping Maramureș County intact. The Prefect of Maramureș, who kept the administration over the entire County, was very outspoken. Maramureș and Ugocsa elected members to the new Romanian parliament in 1919, with a wide participation in the vote among both Romanians and Ruthenians. The elected MPs were of both ethnic groups. They engaged in a series of attempts to wake the political class and the public opinion to what they called "the cause of the over-Tisza lands."

The Saint-Germain agreement of September 10, 1919 between Entente and Czechoslovakia provided for the incorporation of the majority of Carpathian Ruthenia into Slovakia as an autonomous unit of the Slovak portion of the Czechoslovak state.

In Romania, the Brătianu Government resigned on September 12, 1919 and a new government led by Vaitoianu was formed. A member of that government, Alexandru Vaida-Voevod, previously a famous Transylvanian politician in former Austria-Hungary, compiled a documented "proposition about the boundary of Maramureș, to include all Romanian villages", suggesting "a line that would start west of Teceu and would continue to the north along mountain crests to the Galician border, leaving in Romania in addition to the south, the entire subdistrict of Sighet, the subdistricts of Tisza and Taras and half of the subdistrict of Teceu."

On September 30, 1919, Vaiatoianu was replaced by Vaida himself. Vaida was appointed to the Romanian Delegation in Versailles as an expert in the question of Maramureș by one of the new MPs from that County, Dr G Iuga. The latter presented many documents in support of the argument about "the obvious Romanian rights over Maramureș." He used the example of the oldest Romanian Bishopric, established in the village of Peri in 1391, on the northern side of the river, which has been for over 300 years the main center of Romanian culture in the northern half of Transylvania.

Czech-Romanian negotiations in 1919–1920

On December 1, 1919, the Romanian Parliament formed a new Vaida Government as a result of the parliamentary elections in Romania. Vaida had been Austro-Hungarian politician and as a result the relations between the Czech and the Romanian delegations in Versailles eased and the Conference took a more favorable view towards Romania.

On December 16, 1919, in a speech to the Romanian Parliament, Vaida said that he was hopeful in finding a solution "to save the entire Maramureș." After negotiations, the Czech Delegation started accepting the Romanian point of view. On March 15, 1920, the chief of the Czech Delegation to Versailles, Štefan Osuský, informed Vaida that the Maramureș border "is to be settled in short time." The agreement reached by the Romanian and Czech delegations left the entire Maramureș, except the Dolha sub-district, to Romania. In return, the Czechs demanded a military alliance. The agreement was to be signed in London, where the whole conference moved.

Yet another government was formed in Bucharest, this time not led by a Transylvanian, but by General Averescu. The agricultural reform envisioned by Vaida-Voevod deeply upset and threatened the wealthiest land owners and businessmen from pre-1918 Romania, who set aside their infighting to concentrate on the threat posed by Vaida. Of the 16 million inhabitants of Romania in 1920, only seven million lived in the pre-1918 territories. This threatened the pre-1918 political class, which was more feudal, conservative and anti-democratic than the politicians that formerly lived in Austria-Hungary or in the Russian Empire. Another faction that played a key role in the deposition of Vaida was Bratianu, who feared possible inquiries about the misuse of funds by his government before Romania entered World War I in 1916. Averescu assured Bratianu that any possible inquiries would be persecuted.

The Czechoslovak delegation took this opportunity to change its tone and refused to sign the documents on the grounds that the new Romanian government was not legitimate and could not sign agreements as the previous regime had.

On April 1, 1920, the Czech representative in Bucharest reaffirmed the Czechoslovak government's request that the Romanian troops leave the territory up to the Tisza line, informing the Romanian government that it "agrees to negotiate in the future a rectification of the boundary following propositions from a mixed Czech-Romanian border Commission to be formed."

On April 18, 1920, the Romanian Government of General Averescu announced to the Czechs that the army would retreat to the requested line. This reply, implemented at the end of July 1920, created the impression in diplomatic circles that Romanians renounced the territory of Maramureș north of the river Tisza. The Romanian perspective had been given a crushing blow with this hasty withdrawal of troops, a blow against the natural geographic configuration and vital economic interests of the region, without any consent and against the categorical will of the affected Romanian population. On June 4, 1920, Romania signed the Treaty of Trianon and the international community recognized the border in northern Transylvania as it is today. The mixed Czech-Romanian commission was never formed.

== 1920–1938 ==
After the Treaty of Trianon was concluded in 1920, Northern Maramureș became part of Subcarpathian Rus region of Slovakia, one of the component states of Czechoslovakia.

In 1920, there were 60 newspapers edited in the Subcarpathian Rus, the region that apart from northern Maramureș also contained Ung, Bereg and Ugocsa: 22 in Hungarian, ten in Russian, nine in Rusyn, five in Hebrew, four in Czech, four in Ukrainian and six mixed. No newspaper was published in Romanian.

== 1938–1944 ==
Prior and during World War II, Hungary, led by Miklós Horthy, allied itself with Nazi Germany in the hope of re-obtaining some of the territories it had lost under the Treaty of Trianon.

On October 1, 1938 the First Vienna Award came into force. It was a direct result of the Munich Agreement. Czechoslovakia was forced by Germany and Italy to cede the Sudetenland (a part of the Czech Republic mostly inhabited by ethnic Germans) to the Third Reich. On October 6 and October 8, 1938, Slovakia and Subcarpathian-Ruthenia respectively gained autonomy. Then, Germany and Italy arbitrated the 2 November Vienna Protocol, allocating a strip of territory from southern Slovakia (approximately one third of Slovakia) and Subcarpathian-Ruthenia to Hungary. The resumption of Hungarian control over these territories was not an entirely peaceful process. Invited by Germany and Italy, Poland invaded and annexed the Teschen area in Moravia. Nevertheless, Romania refused to invade and annex the compactly Romanian part of Northern Maramureș. The remaining Slovak territory became officially autonomous and had the right to its own parliament and government with Monsignor Jozef Tiso chosen as its leader. However, it did not become fully independent from Czechoslovakia until an ultimatum given by Hitler prompted a vote for "independence" (as a puppet state for Hitler) on March 14, 1939.

The next day, on March 15, 1939, Germany annexed the remainder of Czechoslovakia as the "Reichsprotektorat" of Bohemia and Moravia. Subcarpathian-Ruthenia declared its independence in Khust under President Augustin Voloshin, but was invaded and annexed by Hungary the following day. On March 23, Hungary started an invasion from the Subcarpathian-Ruthenia and occupied additional portions of eastern Slovakia, but later returned them to Slovakia.

The Subcarpathian-Ruthenian land allocated to Hungary as part of the Vienna Protocol (November 2, 1938) Award included the region's largest cities: Uzhhorod, Mukachevo, Berehovo and Chop. Khust, in the East, the westernmost city of Northern Maramureș, remained a part of Subcarpathia-Ruthenia and the seat of its government moved there. The Chust government actively continued to voice complaints over the fate of the western Subcarpathian-Ruthenian territories and vocally asserted the region's case for its own government and the protection of its former lands. The Chust declarations increasingly included a possible attachment to an independent Ukraine. The day after the Slovak vote for independence from Czechoslovakia on March 14, 1939, the Ruthenian Diet led by Premier Augustin Voloshin declared independence for Subcarpathian-Ruthenian under the name "Carpatho-Ukraine." Within 24 hours, Hungarian troops invaded Chust with the assent of Hitler. They liquidated the government and annexed the remainder of Subcarpathian-Ruthenian to Hungary. In addition, the southern part of the Maramureș region was occupied by Hungary between 1940–1944 after the Second Vienna Award during World War II.

== 1944–1991 ==
Northern Maramureș as part of the Zakarpattia Oblast of Ukraine

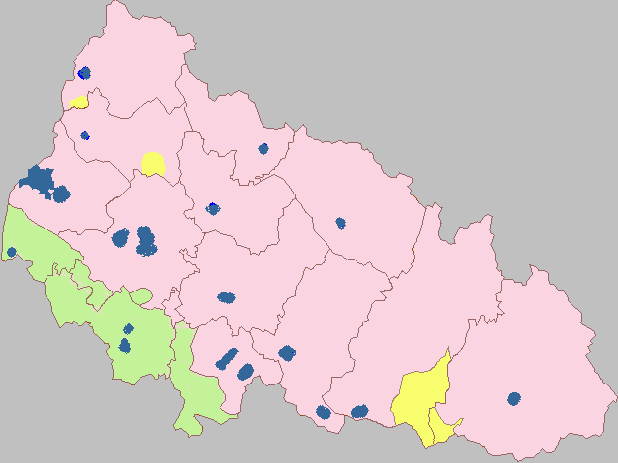
Ethnic map of the Transcarpathia Region (Oblast) in 2001. Legend: Ukarainians Hungarians Romanians Mixed Ukrainians and Russians

At the end of 1944, the war touched Northern Maramureș. On October 18, 1944, Russian troops occupied the villages of Biserica Alba, Apsa de Mijloc and Ocna Slatina and on October 19 Apsa de Jos. On October 23, they created "people's committees" in these villages and on November 26, 1944, a "Congress of people's committees" was held in Mukachevo. It was to adopt a "Manifest of Union of Transcarpathia with the Soviet Ukraine." Someone using the name I.M. Lemaninet purported to represent Apsa de Jos at this Congress, although a person with this name has never been known before or after in the village. However, the official union of Subcarpathian-Ruthenian/Trans-Carpathia with the USSR was formalized in Moscow on June 29, 1945. After that, the Soviet Army organized the "election" of "presidents of people's committees." These were N.I. Guzo in Apsa de Mijloc, V.T. Popsa in Biserica Alba, Gh. Guban in Slatina and M.M. Filip in Apsa de Jos.

One of the first acts of the Soviet administration was to change the historic names of the villages. Apsa de Jos became Dibrova, Apsa de Mijloc became Srednee Vodianoe, Ocna Slatina became Solotvino and Biserica Alba becameBila Tserkva. The names of the smaller villages were also changed.

Collectivization brought a lot of resistance from the local population. After the creation of the first kolkhoz in the village of Apsa de Jos, the biggest village of the Trans-Carpathian region, the locals killed Ivan Chernichko, the president of the kolkhoz. As a result, 21 men were sentenced to a total of 427 years of imprisonment. In Apsa de Mijloc, the locals killed four Soviet officials and were deported to Siberia. Eventually two kolkhoz were created in Apsa de Jos in 1949 and united three years later. In 1959, the kolkhoz of the village of Stramtura was united with the former, which was named "friendship of peoples."

Although the Soviets opened the first university in Uzhhorod, built the first hydro-electric plant (on the Tereblea and Rica rivers), partially electrified the railroad and even held the World Children Olympic Games in Uzhhorod in 1990, severe damage was produced during this period to the cultural and ecological heritage of the whole region of Trans-Carpathia, including Northern Maramureș.

== 1991–present ==
At the fall of the USSR in 1991, Ukraine became independent. Trans-Carpathia has since then been an administrative region (oblast).

== See also ==
- Founding of Moldavia
- History of Transylvania
- Maramureș County

== Bibliography ==
- (in Romanian) Marian Nicolae Tomi, "Maramureșul istoric în date”, Cluj-Napoca, 2005
- (in Romanian and French) Alexandru Filipașcu, Istoria Maramureșului (1940) / Le Maramoureș (1943)
- (in Romanian) Dr. Mircea Dogaru, Românii "Sacrificiilor istorice", Gardianul, 26 October 2004 (available online)
- (in Romanian) Romanian Global News (news agency), Clubul Maramureșenilor din dreapta Tisei, Transcarpația, Ucraina, 5 December 2004
- (in English) https://www.fotw.info/flags/ua-cu39.html
- (in English) http://www.crwflags.com/fotw/flags/ua-zk.html#obl
- (in Romanian) https://web.archive.org/web/20070206090355/http://crestinism-ortodox.ro/html/10/10d_sfantul_iosif_marturisitorul.html
- (in Romanian) https://web.archive.org/web/20060821062920/http://www.bru.ro/istorie/catort.asp?id=cap10
- (in English) http://www.thomasgraz.net/glass/map-ethn.htm
- (in English) http://www.thomasgraz.net/glass/map-popov.htm

== Maps ==
- (in Ukrainian) Zoomable map 1990s
- (in Ukrainian) Zoomable map 1990s
- (in Hungarian) Map 1918
