= Northern Maramureș =

Region in southwestern Ukraine

Northern Maramureș (gold) as part of the Zakarpattia Oblast of Ukraine, with district boundaries shown

Northern Maramureș (Romanian: Maramureșul de Nord, [maraˈmureʃul de ˈnord]; Hungarian: Észak-Máramaros; Ukrainian: Північна Мараморщина, romanized: Pivnichna Maramorshchyna) is a geographic-historical region comprising roughly the eastern half of the Zakarpattia Oblast in southwestern Ukraine, near the border with Romania. Until 1920, it was part of the Maramureș subregion of Transylvania, at which time the former Máramaros County was divided into a northern part (incorporated into Czechoslovakia, the part which is now in Ukraine), and a southern part (incorporated into the Kingdom of Romania).

From 1920 till 1939, the region belonged to Czechoslovakia, then until 1944 to Hungary, and then until 1991 to the Soviet Union. Since 1991, Northern Maramureș has been part of Ukraine.

The Tisza River is part of the boundary separating Northern Maramureș from Romania.

The majority of the population are Ukrainians (Rusyns, Boykos and Hutsuls - indigenous groups), while a Romanian community, totaling 32,100 according to the 2001 Ukraine census, lives compactly, mostly in some eighteen localities, in Rakhiv and Tiachiv raions (districts), close to the Romanian border. For most of the 20th century, communications between Southern and Northern Maramureș were severed. After the collapse of Communist Regimes in Europe, and through cooperation between the Romanian and Ukrainian governments, the restoration of bridges across the Tisza has begun.

== Geography and population ==
=== Geographic description ===
Maramureș is an almost completely enclosed mountain valley with an area slightly smaller than that of the U.S. state of Connecticut. The only way to enter the region, besides crossing mountain slopes of 1,000 meters to 2,500 meters high, is to follow the river Tisza upstream. To a significant extent, the geography of Maramureș has determined its history and distinctive traditions.

Northern Maramureș includes all of the right bank of the Tisza within the historical region, and small mountain portions on the left bank. Rivers that flow through the region include the Tisza, Rika (Rica), and Tereblia. Lake Sinevir is also located there.

=== In present-day Zakarpattia Oblast of Ukraine ===
The territory of the Zakarpattia Region of Ukraine is 12,880 km^{2}. It has 1,287,400 inhabitants (1999 data). Zakarpattia is divided into 13 districts and 5 cities. Of these, Northern Maramureș roughly corresponds to 4 districts and one city. Together these have an area of approximately 6,900 km^{2} and 445,000 inhabitants:

- the city of Khust (Ukrainian: Хуст, Romanian: Hust), with 35,500 inhabitants
- the Khust Raion (Ukrainian: Хуст; abbreviated below HU), with 94,800 inhabitants (different from the city)
- the Mizhhiria Raion (Ukrainian: Міжгір'я; abbreviated below MY), with 50,700 inhabitants
- the Tiachiv Raion, (Ukrainian: Тячів, Romanian: Teceu; abbreviated below TJ), with 172,700 inhabitants
- the Rakhiv Raion (Ukrainian: Рахів; Romanian: Rahău; abbreviated below RA), with 91,300 inhabitants

The most important cities and towns of Northern Maramureș are (the district and population are indicated):

- Bushtyno (Romanian: Bustea, Hungarian: Bustyaháza) TJ; 8,300
- Dubove (Romanian: Dâmbu, Hungarian: Dombó) TJ; 10,400
- Yasinia (Romanian: Frăsini, Hungarian: Kőrösmező) RA; 1,500
- Kobyletska Poliana (Romanian: Poiana Cobilei, Hungarian: Gyertyánliget) RA; 3,300
- Mizhhiria (Romanian: Boureni, Hungarian: Ökörmező) MY; 10,200
- Rakhiv (Romanian: Rahău, Hungarian: Rahó) RA; 17,000
- Solotvyno (Romanian: Slatina, Hungarian: Aknaszlatina) TJ; 9,900
- Teresva (Romanian: Taras, Hungarian: Taracköz) TJ; 7,600
- Tiachiv (Romanian: Teceu, Hungarian: Técső) TJ; 11,300
- Ust-Chorna (Romanian: Gura Ciornei, Hungarian: Királymező) TJ; 1,500
- Velykyi Bychkiv (Romanian: Bocicoiu Mare, Hungarian: Nagybocskó) RA; 9,400
- Vyshkovo (Romanian: Vășcova, Hungarian: Visk) HU; 8,100 (see )

The biggest villages in Northern Maramureș are:

- Bedevlia (Romanian: Bedeu, Hungarian: Bedőháza)
- Bilyn (Romanian: Bilin, Hungarian: Bilin)
- Bila Tserkva (Romanian: Biserica Albă, Hungarian: Tiszafejéregyház)
- Danylovo (Romanian: Danîlovo, Hungarian: Husztsófalva)
- Dilove (Romanian: Trebuşeni, Hungarian: Terebesfejérpatak)
- Nyzhnia Apsha (Romanian: Apşa de Jos, Hungarian: Alsóapsa)
- Dovhe (Romanian: Dolha, Hungarian: Dolha)
- Drahovo (Romanian: Drăgoieşti, Hungarian: Kövesliget)
- Dulovo (Romanian: Duleşti, Hungarian: Dulfalva)
- Hlybokyi Potik (Romanian: Strâmtura, Hungarian: Szorospatak)
- Horinchovo (Romanian: Hernicea, Hungarian: Herincse)
- Hrushovo (Romanian: Peri, Hungarian: Szentmihálykörtvélyes)
- Kalyny (Romanian: Călineştii de Jos, Hungarian: Alsókálinfalva)
- Kolochava (Romanian: Călacea de Jos, Hungarian: Alsókalocsa)
- Nimetska Mokra (Romanian: Mocra, Hungarian: Németmokra)
- Kushnytsia (Romanian: Cuşniţa, Hungarian: Kusnyicza)
- Nehrovets (Romanian: Negrovăţ, Hungarian: Felsőkalocsa)
- Neresnytsia (Romanian: Nereşniţa, Hungarian: Nyéresháza)
- Nyzhnii Bystryi (Romanian: Bistra de Jos, Hungarian: Alsóbisztra)
- Nyzhnie Selyshche (Romanian: Sălişte, Hungarian: Alsószelistye)
- Vilshany (Romanian: Vulşana, Hungarian: Égermező)
- Vilkhovatyi (Romanian: Plăiuţ, Hungarian: Kiscserjés)
- Pryslip (Romanian: Prislopu Mare, Hungarian: Pereszlő)
- Serednie Vodiane (Romanian: Apşa de Mijloc, Hungarian: Középapsa)
- Tereblia (Romanian: Talabor, Hungarian: Talaborfalu)
- Topchyno (Romanian: Topcina, Hungarian: Topcsinó)
- Uglia (Romanian: Uglea, Hungarian: Uglya)
- Verkhnie Vodiane (Romanian: Apşa de Sus, Hungarian: Felsőapsa)
- Vonihove (Romanian: Voineşti, Hungarian: Vajnág)
- Zolotarovo (Romanian: Domneşti, Hungarian: Ötvösfalva)

=== In historical Maramureș ===
Northern Maramureș is historically and geographically close to southern Maramureș, and together form the historical region of Maramureș (Romanian: Maramureș, Hungarian: Máramaros). Between 1870 and 1918, Máramaros (north and south) was a county in the Transleitanian part of Austria-Hungary. It was divided into 10 rural districts (Hungarian: járás, Romanian: plase) and 1 urban district (Hungarian: rendezett tanácsú város, Romanian: plasă urbană):

Northern Maramureș	Southern Maramureș
Sziget / Sighet /- (rural district)
Dolha / Dolha / Dovhe (capital: Dolha / Dolha / Dovhe)	Izavölgy / Iza / - (capital: Dragomérfalva / Dragomireşti / -)
Huszt / Hust / Khust (capital: Huszt / Hust / Khust)	Sugatag / Şugatag / - (capital: Aknasugatag / Ocna Şugatag / -)
Ökörmező / Boureni / Mizhhir'ya (capital: Ökörmező / Boureni / Mizhhir'ya)	Visó / Vişeu / -(capital: Felsővisó / Vişeu de Sus / -)
Taracviz / Taras / Teresva (capital: Taracköz / Taras / Teresva)	Sziget / Sighet /- (urban district; capital: Máramarossziget / Sighetu Marmaţiei / -)
Técső / Teceu / Tiachiv (capital: Técső / Teceu / Tiachiv)
Tiszavölgy / Tisa / Tissa (capital: Rahó / Rahău / Rakhiv)

Note: All names are written in the following order: Hungarian / Romanian / Ukrainian.

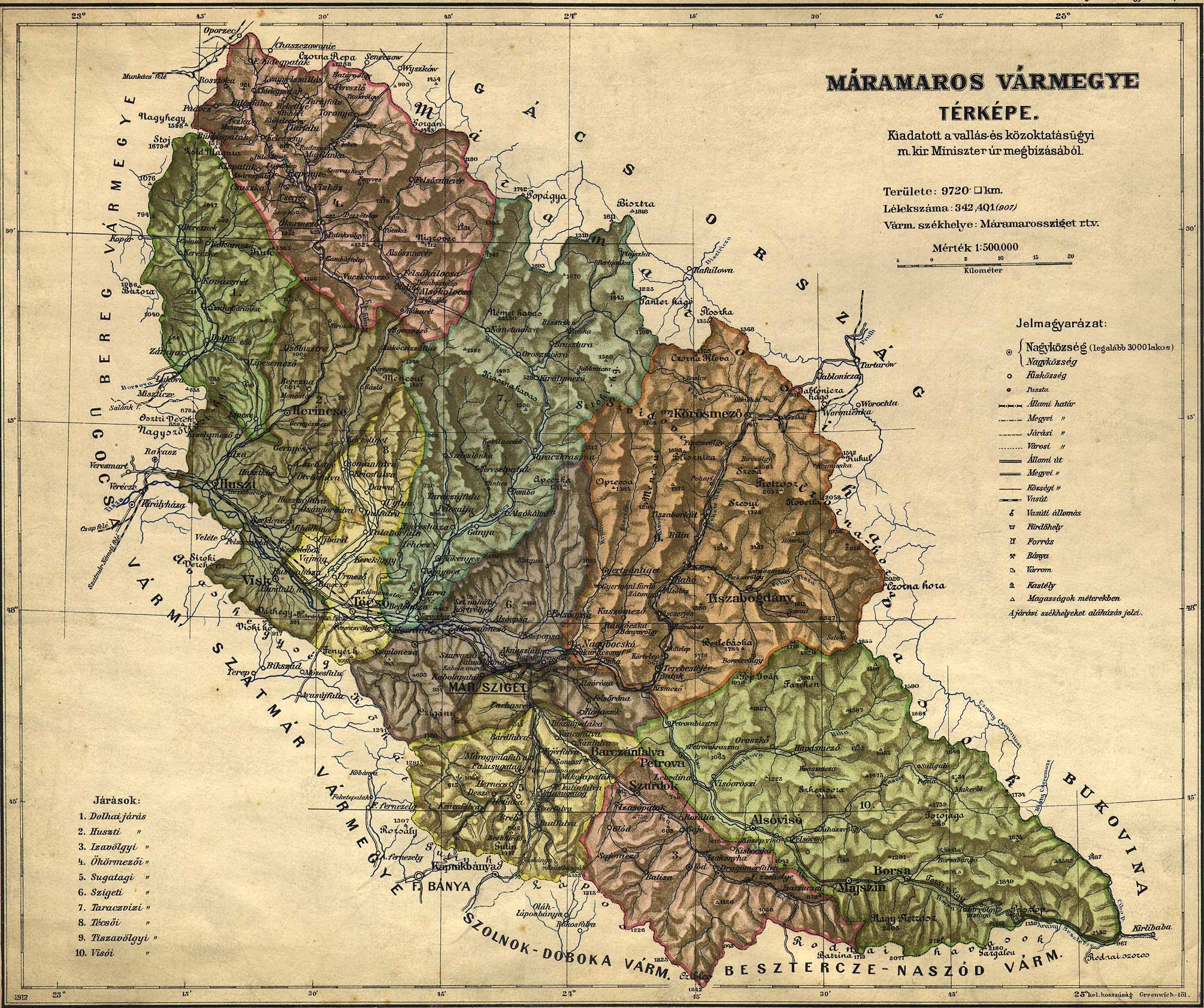
Máramaros vármegye (county) in 1912 (map in Hungarian).

Dolha, Huszt, Ökörmező, Taracviz, Técső, and Tiszavölgy districts each had a Ukrainian majority (with Tiszavölgy having a specifically Hutsul majority). The rural Sziget district, along with Izavölgy, Sugatag, and Visó districts each had a Romanian majority, while the urban Sziget district was mixed Hungarian/Romanian. There was a significant Ukrainian minority in Visó, and significant Romanian minorities in Huszt, Taracviz, Técső, and Tiszavölgy districts. Visó also contained a significant German minority ("Zipser") around the city of Felsővisó (Romanian: Vișeu de Sus; German: Oberwischau).

The six districts in the left-hand column were apportioned to Czechoslovakia in 1920. In 1938, Hungary regained their southern portion by the terms of the First Vienna Award and then seized the rest in March 1939. In 1944 they went to the Soviet Union. Since 1991 they have been part of Ukraine. The four districts in the right-hand column were given to Romania, where they have remained ever since, except for 1940–1944, when they were again in Hungary by the terms of the Second Vienna Award. The rural Sziget (Sighet) district, despite being ethnically homogeneously Romanian, was divided: the part north of the Tisza river followed the same fate as the Ukrainian districts, while the part south of the Tisza, the same as the Romanian ones. More than half of the Romanian minority in the present Zakarpattia Oblast resides in what before 1920 was the rural Sziget district.

The total area of Maramureș county was 10,354.9 km^{2}, of which 6,974 km^{2} became the northern part and 3,381 km^{2} became the southern part. The approximately 160 localities were divided as follows: slightly less than 100 joined the north, and slightly more than 60 joined the south. in 1920, the south had a population of approximately 155,000. A majority of the inhabitants were Romanian, with Jewish, Hungarian, Ukrainian and German minorities. The north at the same time had a population of about 220,000, including some 20,000 Romanians.

According to the 1910 Austrian census, Máramaros County had a population which by language was:

- Ruthenian, 159,489
- Romanian, 84,510
- German, 59,552
- Hungarian, 52,964.

A substantial part of the German and Hungarian-speaking population were in fact Jews.

=== In Carpathian Ruthenia ===
Carpathian Ruthenia, i.e., the region inhabited by Rusyns (Ruthenians) in Austria-Hungary, spread over some two-thirds of the historic counties of Ung, Bereg, and Ugocsa (the remaining one third are respectively Slovak, Hungarian, and Romanian), and from the 16th century also gradually over a part (up to half) of Maramureș county. Therefore, in texts dealing with the period after 1600, Northern Maramureș is sometimes included in historic Carpathian Ruthenia, historic Ruszinszko, or Pidkarpadska Rus', as opposed to earlier texts, when it is not.

=== Demographic data ===
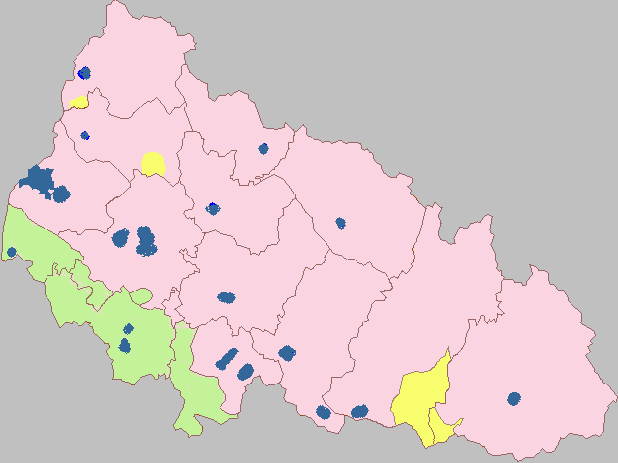
Ethnic map of Zakarpattia Oblast in 2001. Ukrainians Hungarians Romanians mixed Ukrainians and Russians

Census year	Total population of Pidkarpadska Rus' / Zakarpattia	Total population of the 4 raions and Khust	Ukrainians	Romanians (official numbers)
1880	408,971			16,713
1921	604,745	220,000	140,000	20,000
1930	734,315			
1959	920,170			18,346
1970	1,056,000			23,454
1979	1,155,000			27,155
1989	1,245,000			29,485
2001	c. 1,255,000			32,100

=== Romanian localities in Northern Maramureș ===
In Northern Maramureș, there are anywhere between ca. 32,000 (according to official Ukrainian sources), ca. 40,000 (according to most Romanian sources), to over 50,000 Romanians living today in a compact area of about 300 km^{2}, in 17 villages and one town, separated from Romania only by the river Tisza. This compactly Romanian-inhabited region, which itself separates the Hutsul areas (most of the Rakhiv raion/district) in the east from the rest of Zakarpattia, corresponds exactly to the north-Tisza part of the former rural district of Sighet in Máramaros County before 1920 (see map). These 18 localities, with their quasi-total Romanian population, are (population data from the 2001 Ukrainian census):

- in Teceu (Tiachiv) district (raion)
  - the town of Ocna Slatina (Ukrainian: Solotvyno, Hungarian: Aknaszlatina), a new village first mentioned ca. 1360 (the old one was burned down by the Tatars in 1241); 9,700 inhabitants and 2,200 households
  - Apşa de Jos (Ukrainian: Dibrova, Hungarian: Alsóapsa), first mentioned in 1387; includes Valea-Malului; 8,339 inhabitants and 2,300 households
  - Strâmtura (Ukrainian: Hlybokyi Potik, Hungarian: Szurdok), 5,743 inhabitants, 1,398 households
  - Teteş (Ukrainian: Topchyno, Hungarian: Topcsinó), 2,240 inhabitants, 610 households
  - Peri (Ukrainian: Hrushovo, Hungarian: Szentmihálykörtveliés, i.e. St. Michael Monastery), first mentioned ca. 1200
  - Podișor (Ukrainian: Podishor)
  - Bescău
  - Cărbuneşti
  - Bouţul Mare
  - Bouţul Mic
- in Rahău (Rakhiv) district (raion)
  - Biserica Albă (Ukrainian: Belaia Ţercovi, Hungarian: Tiszafejéregyhaz) 1373
  - Apşa de Mijloc (Ukrainian: Sredne Vodyane, Hungarian: Kösépapsa) 1406
  - Apşa de Sus (Ukrainian: Verhne Vodyane, Hungarian: Felsöapsa)
  - Apşiţa Veche (Ukrainian: Voditsa, Hungarian: Kisapsa)
  - Dobric (Ukrainian: Dobrik, Hungarian: Dobrikdülő)
  - Plăiuţ (Ukrainian: Playuts, Hungarian: Plajuc)
  - Strâmba (Ukrainian: Strimba, Hungarian: Almáspatak)
  - Paladi

Some Romanians also live in localities of Northern Maramureș outside the above compact area:

- the town of Taras (Teresva)
- the village of Bedeu (Bedevlya)
- the city of Teceu (Tiachiv)
- the town of Buştina (Bushtino)
- the village of Visc (Vishkove)
- the town of Bocicoiu Mare (Velykyy Bychkiv)
- the city of Hust (Khust)

although far fewer than in previous centuries.

Note: There are also Romanians in the two major Zakarpattian cities, Uzhhorod and Mukachevo, as well as in the town of Korolevo (Romanian: Craia), in Vinogradovo raion, which are not in Maramureș, but respectively in Ung, Bereg, and Ugocsa. There are also two other Romanian villages:

- Poroshkovo (Romanian: Poroșcovo, Hungarian: Poroskő), Perechyn Raion, near Munţii Păduroşi, 45 km NE of Ujgorod, 3000 inhabitants, and
- Myrcha (Romanian: Mircea), Velykyi Berezin raion, 35 km N of Ujgorod, 1500 inhabitants.

The two villages are 40 km one from the other, in the northwest of Zakarpattia, which is not part of Northern Maramureș, but of the former Ung County. They are the last remnants of the Vlachs (Romanians) who inhabited present-day Hungary and Zakarpattia before the arrival of the Slavs (6th-8th centuries) and Hungarians (9th century), when they were isolated and afterwards assimilated. Their Ukrainian neighbors also call the inhabitants of these two villages volokhi or loshkarini, Slavic names for Romanians no longer in current use.

== History ==
=== Maramureș before the split ===
In the Middle Ages, Maramureș had a Romanian population, organized into the Voivodeship of Maramureș with a voevod elected from among the village noblemen (Romanian: knezi). The majority of the peasants in the region were free and went by a regional term specific only to Maramureş: nămeşi (from neam, clan), and only a minority were serfs (first serfs mentioned in documents in 1405).

In the more mountainous villages and hamlets, the main dwelling was raising sheep, which implied constant moving in search of new pastures to accommodate raising stocks. As a consequence, between 10th and 13th centuries, modern mountainous regions of eastern and central Slovakia saw a migration of Vlach (Romanian) shepherds from Maramureş, eventually assimilated. Another similar migration occurred in the 14th century with destination the mountainous southeasternmost corner of modern Poland. The new migrants were given special rights known as Jus Valahicum, and a century later serious local feuds occurred when these rights were abolished and the Vlachs were assimilated. A significant portion of the heritage of Gorals comes from the assimilated Vlachs. Other migrants who advanced along the Carpathian range between the 14th and 17th centuries became known as Moravian Vlachs. On their way they gradually lost their original language with the exception of some Romanian words they use in their Czech and Slovak dialect, but they preserved much of their culture (especially folklore, songs and costumes) and economic base, namely sheep breeding. In 1644, during the Thirty Years War, they were crushed by Albrecht von Wallenstein.

In the 14th century, several groups of Maramureș noblemen with their warriors (Romanian: viteji) established themselves in modern northern Moldavia, and were the driving force that led to the creation of that principality in 1345 (by Dragoş of Bedeu, former voevod of Maramureş), and its independence in 1359 (up to 3,000 families in strength, led by Bogdan of Cuhea, the voevod of Maramureș who previously led a 20-year-old campaign to avoid the Voevodat of Maramureș being turned and organized as a County (Comitatus), as King Louis of Anjou of Hungary strove for and eventually succeeded).

The Comitatus of Máramaros was formally established in the Kingdom of Hungary in 1303. In late 14th and early 15th century, count-voevod Drag of Bedeu, Dragoş' grandson, raise to eventually become one of the 10 peers of the Kingdom of Hungary that in 1386 enthroned Sigismund of Luxembourg as King, who in turn in not yet clear circumstances confiscated in 1404 all the estate of Drag and his family in Maramureș (over 50 villages), and forced them to resettle in a small estate in Szatmar. In 1391, Drag and his brother Balc were responsible for obtaining from the Patriarch of Constantinople raising of the New Rum Monastery of Saint Michael the Archangel of Peri (modern village of Grushevo in Northern Maramureș on the bank of the Tisza) to the rank of Stauropegic Bishopric, this being the first Romanian (non-rural) bishopric, with jurisdiction over eight nearby counties.

Since the 15th century, local nobility was largely assimilated within the Hungarian nobility, adopted Catholicism and Hungarian language. In 1526, after the collapse of the Kingdom of Hungary at the hands of the Ottoman Turks, Máramaros, along with the whole of modern Transcarpathia, was incorporated into the semi-independent Principality of Transylvania, which became a Habsburg domain in 1687, and at the in 1867 was included in the Hungarian part of Austria-Hungary.

The ethnic composition of Maramureș started to diversify already in the Middle Ages with the arrival of German colonists that founded or re-built five cities: Visc, Teceu, Câmpulung, Bocicoi, and Sighet. The adoption of Hungarian language and the Catholic faith in the 15th century (then a Protestant one in the 16th century) by the Transylvanian nobility created a linguistically and religiously distinct upper class which ruled the area. Since the 16th century, Ukrainian peasants moved from nearby Bereg and Ugocsa counties, and from Polish Galicia. The Ukrainization of some villages in Northern Maramureș was strengthened by the long jurisdictional disputes in 18th century between the Greek Catholic Bishopric of Muncach (Ukrainian) and Orthodox Bishopric of Peri (Romanian), later also with participation of Romanian Greek Catholics. In the 19th century the region was also settled by numerous Jews who arrived from Galicia. The Ukrainian population of Northern Maramureș is also diverse: Hutsuls in the east, Boiko in northwest, and Rusyn in the western part, in Tisza valley, the former two originating from Galicia, and the latter from Bereg and Ugocsa.

After the defeat of the Central Powers in World War I, the northern part of the comitatus (about 60% of the territory) became part of Carpathian Ruthenia within the newly formed Czechoslovakia. The southern part (40%, including the former capital Sighetu Marmaţiei) became part of Romania. This division was confirmed by the Treaty of Trianon in 1920.

=== Northern Maramureș after the split ===
Just before World War II, the region was part of the briefly independent Carpatho-Ukraine in March 1939, but this republic, comprising the part of Carpathian Ruthenia not given to Hungary by the First Vienna Award a few months earlier, was almost immediately annexed by Horthyst Hungary, which in 1940 also annexed the Romanian part of Maramureș following the Second Vienna Award. After the war, in 1945 the formerly Czechoslovak Maramureș was transferred to the Soviet Union, and in 1946 it was included in the Zakarpattia Oblast of the Ukrainian SSR. The latter after the dissolution of the Soviet Union became the independent Ukraine.

== Historic monuments and heritage sites ==
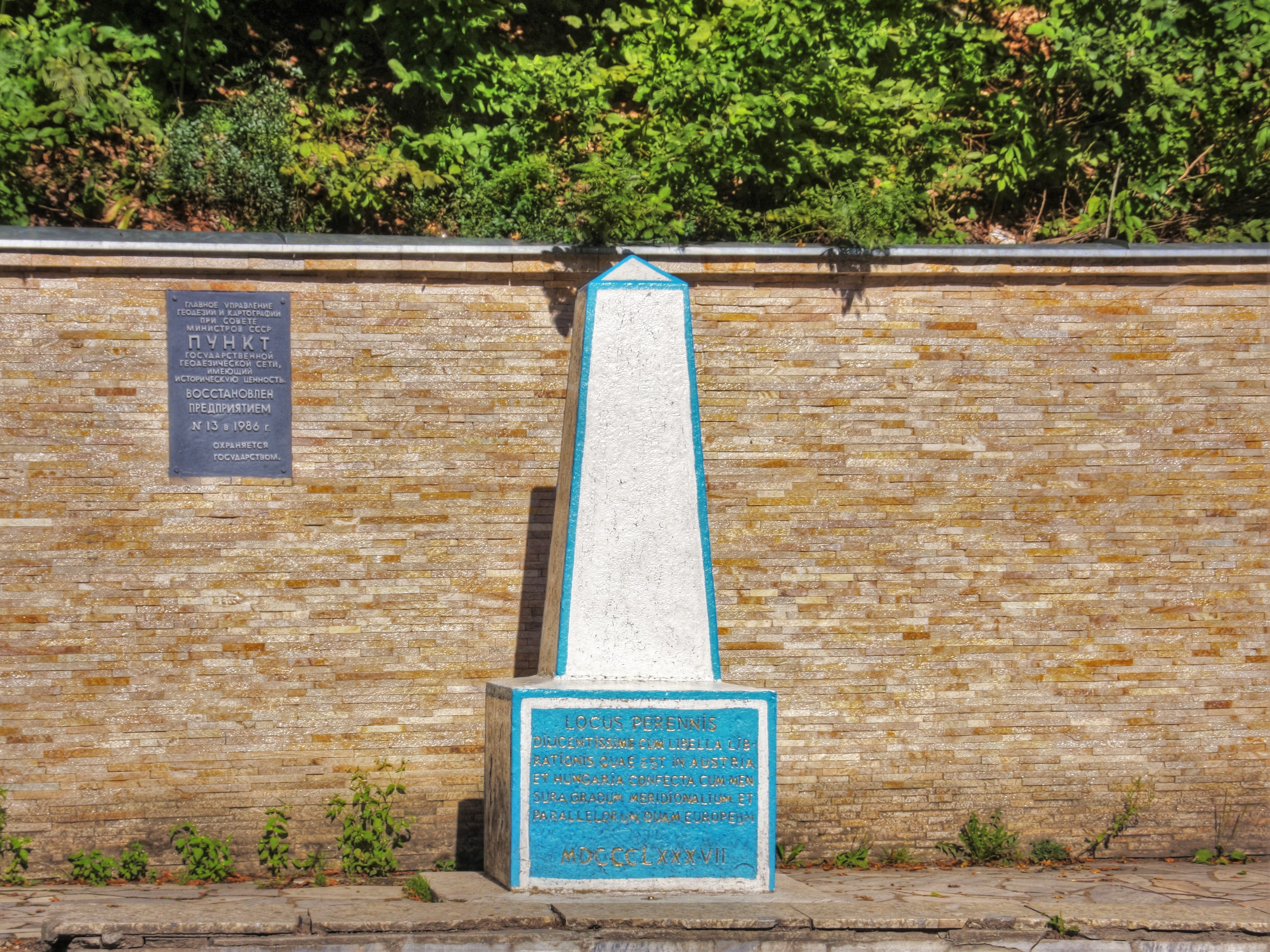
The 1887 marker near Rakhiv claiming the location being the Geographical centre of Europe.

=== Churches, monasteries and sites ===
- St. Michael the Archangel Monastery, Peri (1215), became the first Romanian bishopric on 13 August 1391, by the efforts of voivodes Drag and Balcu, grandsons of the famous voivode Dragoş, in the village of Peri (Grushevo), Tiachiv (Teceu) district (in the Romanian country)
- Church of the Nativity (Steblivka) (1797) in the village of Steblivka, Khust district (in the Rusyn country)
- St. Michael's Church (Crainicova) (1666–1668) in the village of Crainicova, Khust district (in the Rusyn country)
- Church of the Holy Spirit (Colochava) (17th century) near the villages of Colochava and Horb, Mizhhirsky district (in the Rusyn country)
- Church (1776) in the village of Apşa de Jos (Dibrova), Tiachiv (Teceu) district (in the Romanian country)
- St. Nicholas Church (Seredny Vodany) (1428) in the village of Apsa de Mijloc (Seredny Vodany), Rahiv (Rahau) district (in the Romanian country)
- Strukivska Church (1824) in the village of Yasinia, Rahiv district (in the Hutsul country)
- Horian Rotunda, 12th-14th centuries (don't know where)
- 1887 marker near Rakhiv claiming the location being the geographical centre of Europe

=== Feudal nobility ===
A considerable part of Maramureș's history was associated in past centuries with well-known feudal families of Europe. From the 14th to the 19th century:

- Rozhoni (owners of the village of Dovhe/Dolha),
- Pereni (owners of Sevljus and 117 villages in the nearby county of Ugocea/Ugocsa),
- Dovhay (owners of Dovhe/Dolha, Soymy/Şoimi, Kyshnytsya/Cuşniţa, Volove, Siltse, Irshava, in all 20 villages in the nearby county of Bereg),
- Dragoş (Drahush) (Ocna Slatina/Solotvyno), and 5 villages in later centuries, while in the time of the brothers Balcu (Balka) and Drag (Draha) they owned Korolevo/Craia (this town is in Ugocea), Khust/Hust, Tyachiv/Teceu, Iza, and 32 villages along the Tisza/Tysa/Tisa and Tereblya/Tereblea rivers (all these in Maramureș),
- Urmezeyi (27 villages in Maramureș),
- Bilkey-Iloshvay (24 villages in Maramureș),
- Pohani (villages along the lower reaches of the rivers Tereblya/Tereblea and Teresva/Taras in Maramureș),
- Hunyadi (Corvin) (32 villages and two towns in the nearby counties of Ugocea/Ugocsa and Bereg).

Other prominent feudal families of 16th-19th centuries were Karoli, Teleki, Toldi, Kornish, Stoyko, Fisher, Reyti, and Soplontsay.

=== People and traditions ===
The people of Maramureș are generally tougher and swifter, the sense of justice and honor is very keen for them. They have, and perhaps for good reasons, great pride in their specificity, and even in their toughness, since in few other places are ancient Romanian traditions preserved to such an extent. Their wooden churches are quite beautiful. Every village has its separate set of traditions, and every little valley has a name that begins with "The Country of...".

== See also ==
- Zakarpattia Oblast
