= Maramureș (disambiguation) =

Maramureș is a geographical and historical region in present-day Romania and Ukraine.

Maramureș or Máramaros may also refer to:

- Máramaros County, a historic county in the former Kingdom of Hungary
- Maramureș County, a county in Romania 1920–1938, 1944–1950, and since 1968
- Maramureș Region, a former administrative unit in Romania, 1960–1968
- Romanian Catholic Diocese of Maramureș, a diocese of the Romanian Greek Catholic Church
- Maramureș Mountains Natural Park, a protected area in Romania
- Maramureș dialect, one of the dialects of the Romanian language
- Maramureș Airport, a minor international airport in northwest Romania, located in Tăuții-Măgherăuș
- Wooden churches of Maramureș, specific style old churches made of wood beams

== See also ==
- History of Maramureș
- Sighetu Marmației
