= Máramaros County =

County of the Kingdom of Hungary

Máramaros County Comitatus Maramarosiensis (Latin) Máramaros vármegye (Hungarian) Komitat Maramuresch (German) Комітат Марамарош (Rusyn) Comitatul Maramureș (Romanian) Kомітат Мармарош (Ukrainian)
- County of the Kingdom of Hungary (1402–1526); County of the Eastern Hungarian Kingdom (1526–1570); County of the Principality of Transylvania (1570–1733); County of the Kingdom of Hungary (1733–1920, 1940–1945)
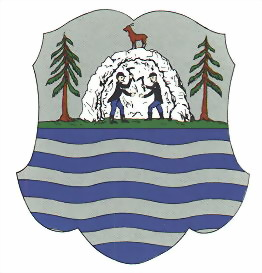
- Coat of arms

- Capital: Máramarossziget
- Area
  - Coordinates: 47°56′N 23°53′E
  - 1910: 9,716 km^{2} (3,751 sq mi)
- Population
  - 1910: 357,705
- History
  - Established: 1402
  - Treaty of Trianon: 4 June 1920
  - County recreated (Second Vienna Award): 30 August 1940
  - Disestablished: 1945
Preceded by
Voivodeship of Maramureș
- Today part of: Ukraine (6,148 km^{2}) Romania (3,568 km^{2}) tnotes = Sighetu Marmației is the current name of the capital.

Máramaros County (German: Komitat Maramuresch; Hungarian: Máramaros vármegye; Latin: Comitatus Maramarosiensis; Romanian: Comitatul Maramureș; Rusyn: Комітат Марамарош; Ukrainian: Kомітат Мармарош) was an administrative county (comitatus) of the Kingdom of Hungary. Its territory is now in north-western Romania and western Ukraine. The capital of the county was Máramarossziget (present-day Sighetu Marmației).

== Geography ==
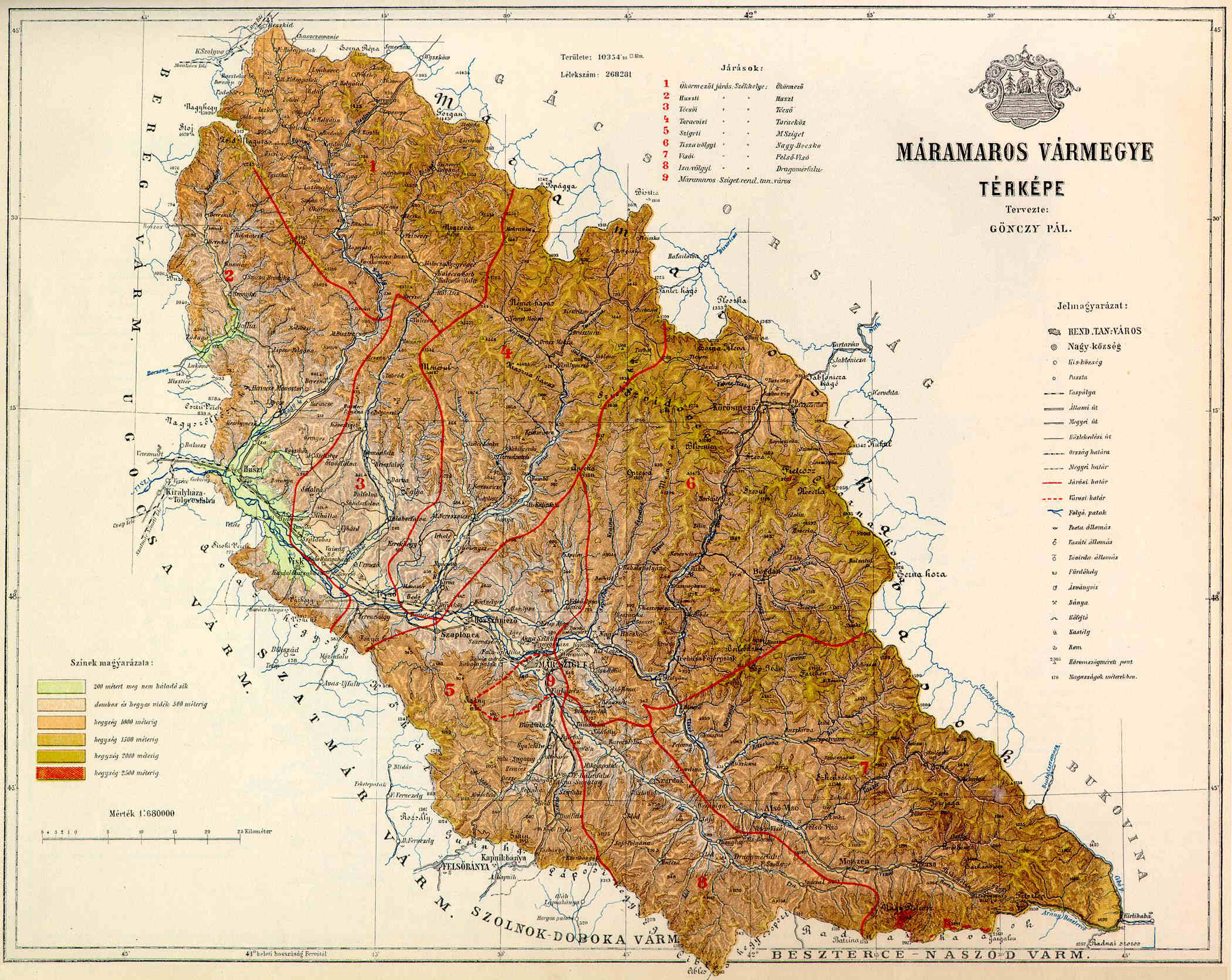
Map of Máramaros, 1891.

Máramaros county shared borders with the Austrian crownlands Galicia (now in Poland and Ukraine) and Bukovina (now in Romania and Ukraine) and the Hungarian counties Bereg, Ugocsa, Szatmár, Szolnok-Doboka and Beszterce-Naszód. It was situated on both sides of the river Tisza, and in the Carpathian Mountains. Its area was 9,716 km^{2} around 1910.

== History ==
The first mention of the region in the written sources is from 1199 ("cum in Maramorisio tempore venationis venatum ivissemus"). In the 13th century, it was very scarcely inhabited. At the end of the Árpád period, early 14th century, Máramaros was established as an administrative unit, which profited from the salt mines and trade routes in the area. The growth of its population started when the five crown cities (Máramarossziget, Hosszúmező, Huszt, Técső, Visk) were founded: Máramarossziget in 1352, the other four in 1329. In 1343, the Voivodeship of Maramureș, granted to a small Romanian nobility, was established. The region was reorganized into the Máramaros County in 1402.

In 1570, it became part of the Partium within the Principality of Transylvania. There were no significant changes in its territory, except that the valley of Dolha was attached from Bereg County. In September 1914, as part of World War I, the Russian army invaded Máramaros and occupied Máramarossziget; they were expelled in February 1915. In 1920, after the Treaty of Trianon, the northern part of the county became part of newly formed Czechoslovakia (Subcarpathian Rus'). The southern part (including Sighetu Marmației) became part of Romania.

The northern part was returned to Hungary by the annexation of the remainder of Carpathian Ruthenia after Czechoslovakia ceased to exist in 1939, however the redeemed territories of the former county remained separate from the administrative branch office of Máramaros. After the Second Vienna Award, the rest of the county became part of Hungary as well and Máramaros County was recreated on this territory, with Máramarossziget as capital. Afterwards, the northern part of Máramaros county along with the administrative branch offices of Máramaros became part of the Soviet Union, Ukrainian SSR, Zakarpattia Oblast. Since 1991, when the Soviet Union split up, the Zakarpattya region is part of Ukraine.

The southern part of the county is now part of the Romanian county Maramureș.

== Demographics ==
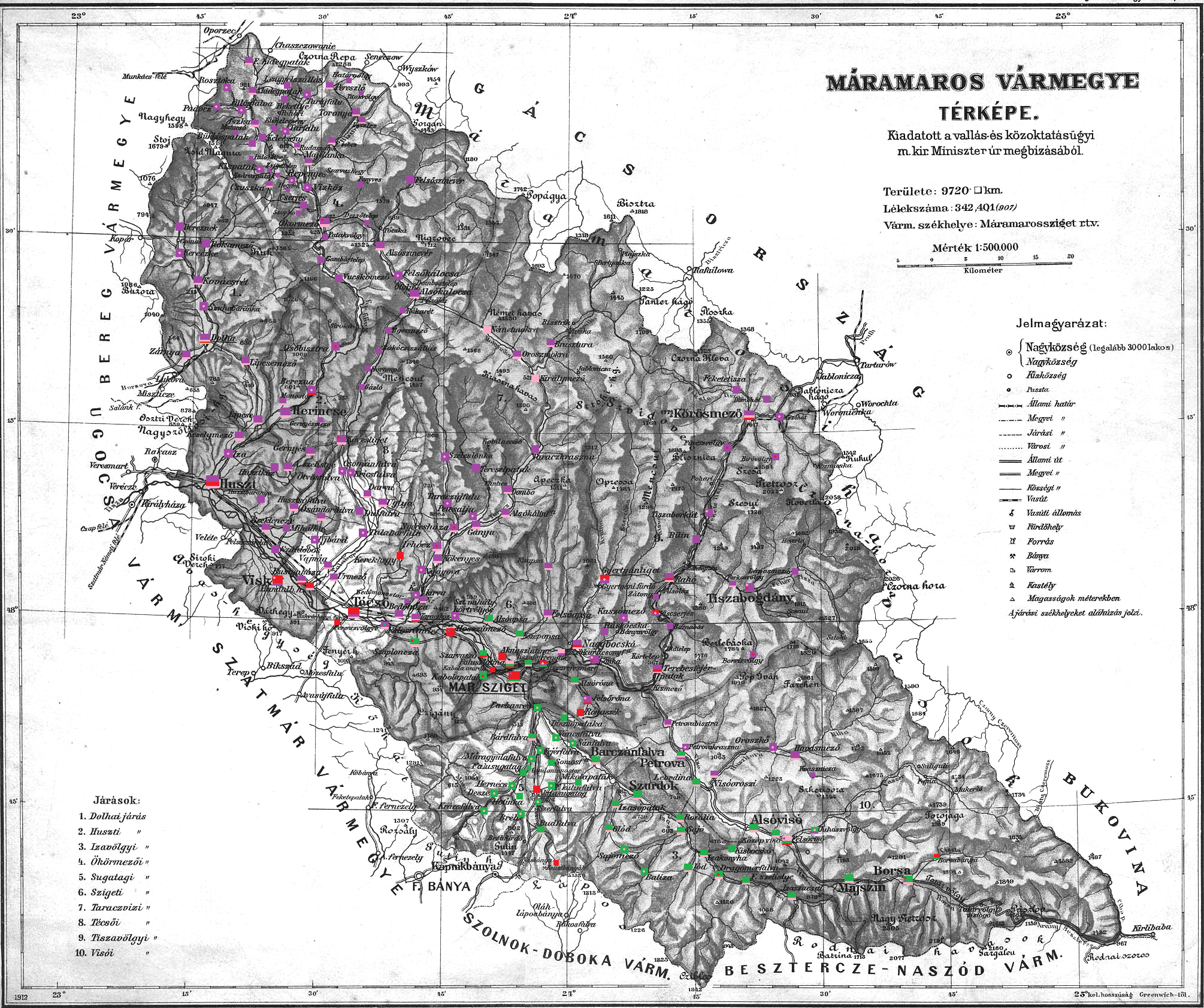
Ethnic map of the county with data of the 1910 census (see the key in the description).

Population by mother tongue (Note: Only linguistic communities > 1% are displayed.)
Census	Total	Ruthenian	Romanian	German	Hungarian	Other or unknown
1880	227,436	106,221 (48.23%)	57,059 (25.91%)	31,718 (14.40%)	23,819 (10.82%)	1,417 (0.64%)
1890	268,281	122,528 (45.67%)	64,957 (24.21%)	45,679 (17.03%)	33,610 (12.53%)	1,507 (0.56%)
1900	309,598	143,621 (46.39%)	74,978 (24.22%)	47,449 (15.33%)	42,403 (13.70%)	1,147 (0.37%)
1910	357,705	159,489 (44.59%)	84,510 (23.63%)	59,552 (16.65%)	52,964 (14.81%)	1,190 (0.33%)

Population by religion (Note: Only religious communities > 1% are displayed.)
Census	Total	Greek Catholic	Jewish	Roman Catholic	Calvinist	Other or unknown
1880	227,436	168,805 (74.22%)	33,463 (14.71%)	17,975 (7.90%)	6,790 (2.99%)	403 (0.18%)
1890	268,281	194,040 (72.33%)	45,073 (16.80%)	20,879 (7.78%)	7,763 (2.89%)	526 (0.20%)
1900	309,598	220,817 (71.32%)	56,006 (18.09%)	23,430 (7.57%)	8,918 (2.88%)	427 (0.14%)
1910	357,705	254,215 (71.07%)	65,694 (18.37%)	26,204 (7.33%)	9,646 (2.70%)	1,946 (0.54%)

== Subdivisions ==
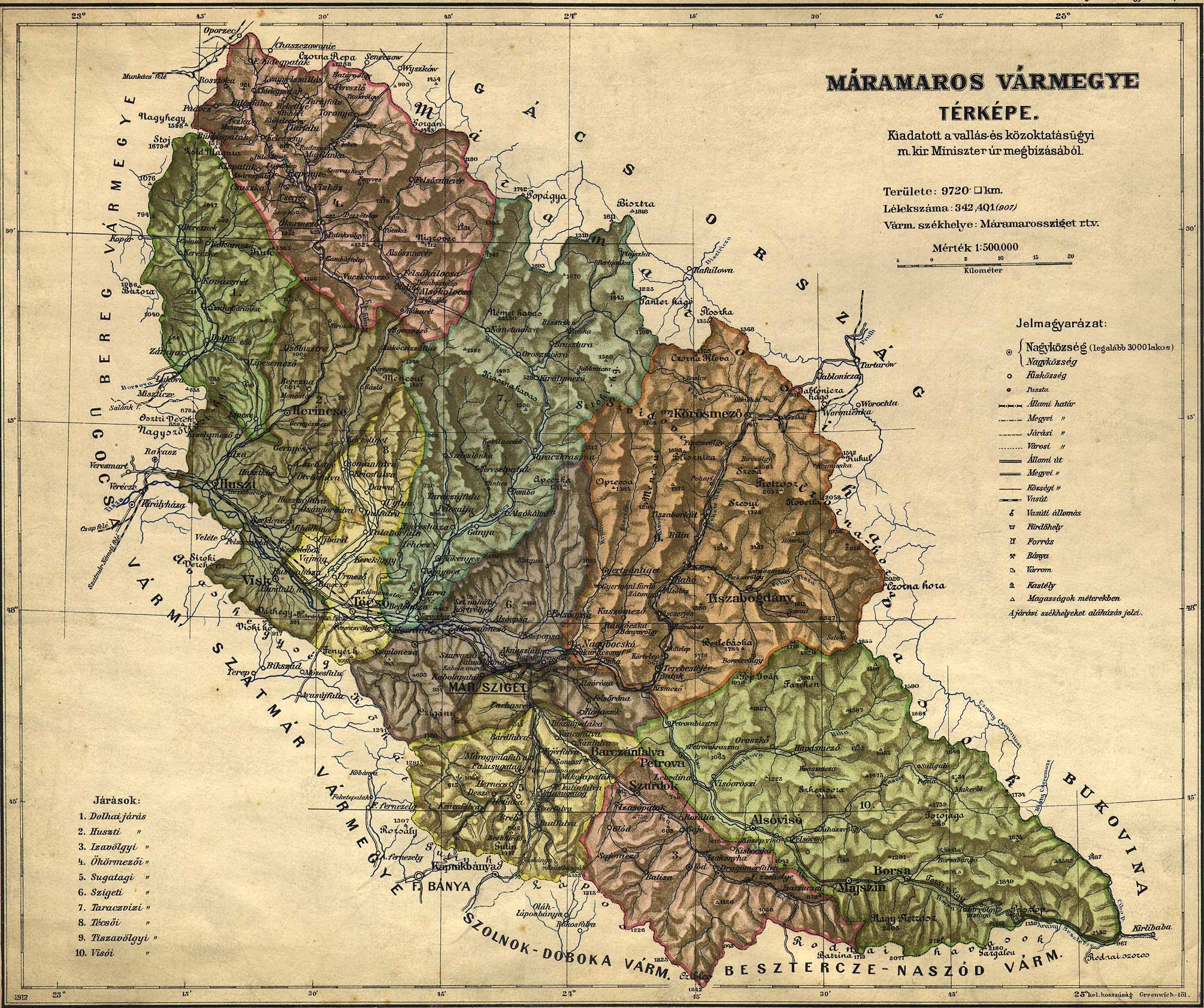

In the early 20th century, the subdivisions of Máramaros county were:

Districts (járás)
District	Capital
Dolha	Dolha (now Dovhe, Ukraine)
Huszt	Huszt (now Khust, Ukraine)
Izavölgy	Dragomérfalva (now Dragomirești, Romania)
Ökörmező	Ökörmező (now Mizhhiria, Ukraine)
Sugatag	Aknasugatag (now Ocna Șugatag, Romania)
Sziget	Máramarossziget (now Sighetu Marmației, Romania)
Taracviz	Taracköz (now Teresva, Ukraine)
Técső	Técső (now Tiachiv, Ukraine)
Tiszavölgy	Rahó (now Rakhiv, Ukraine)
Visó	Felsővisó (now Vișeu de Sus, Romania)
Urban districts (rendezett tanácsú város)
Máramarossziget (now Sighetu Marmației, Romania)
