= Mizhhiria =

Rural locality in Zakarpattia Oblast, Ukraine

Mizhhiria Міжгір'я
- Rural settlement
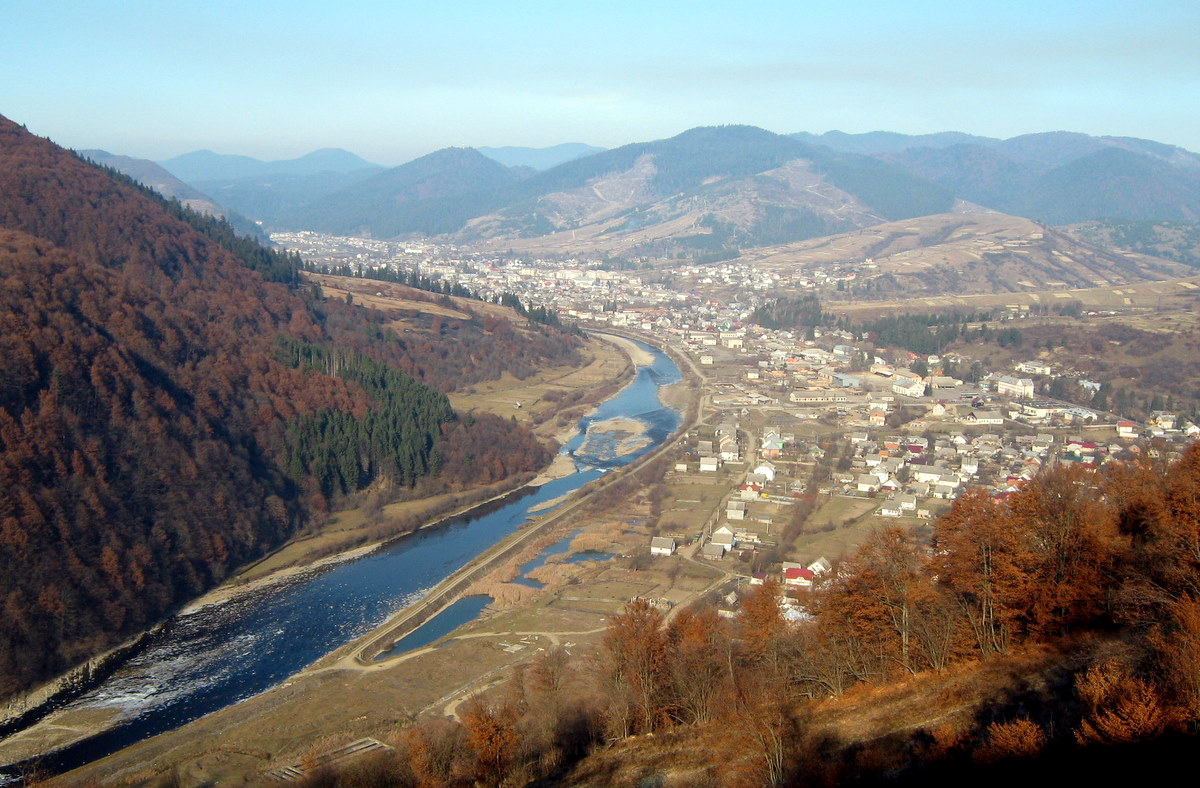

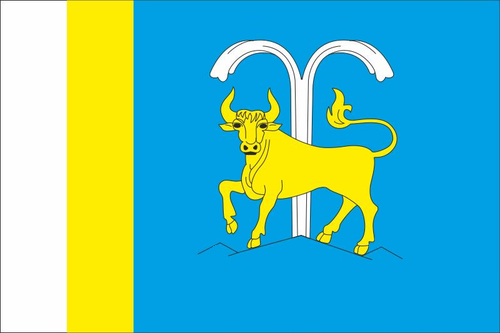
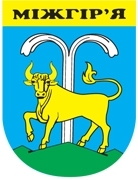
- Flag Coat of arms
- Interactive map of Mizhhiria
- Location within Zakarpattia Oblast Location within Ukraine
- Coordinates: 48°31′43″N 23°30′07″E
- Country: Ukraine
- Oblast: Zakarpattia Oblast
- Raion: Khust Raion
- First mentioned: 1415
- Town status: 1947

Government
  - Town Head: Vasyl Schur

Area
  - Total: 4.58 km^{2} (1.77 sq mi)
- Elevation: 437 m (1,434 ft)

Population (2022)
  - Total: 9,432 ▼
  - Density: 2,060/km^{2} (5,330/sq mi)
- Time zone: UTC+2 (EET)
  - Summer (DST): UTC+3 (EEST)
- Postal code: 90000
- Area code: +380 3146
- Website: http://rada.gov.ua/

Mizhhiria (Ukrainian: Міжгір'я; Hungarian: Ökörmező; Romanian: Boureni) is a rural settlement in Khust Raion, Zakarpattia Oblast, western Ukraine. The town is also the administrative center of Mizhhiria Raion (district), housing the district's local administration buildings. The town's population was 9,656 as of the 2001 Ukrainian Census. Current population: 9,432 (2022 estimate).

== History ==
The settlement was first mentioned in 1415 as a possession of the Hungarian feudal lords. It was part of the Kingdom of Hungary (from the 11th century to 1918 and from 1938 to 1944) as the settlement of Ökörmező in the Máramaros County and Ökörmező District. From 1918 to 1938, the settlement was a part of Czechoslovakia as Volove (However Ruthenians used Mežhorje). In 1947, its status was upgraded to that of an urban-type settlement. It was renamed "Mizhhiria" in 1953.

On 26 January 2024, a new law entered into force which abolished the status of urban-type settlement, and Mizhhiria became a rural settlement.

== Gallery ==
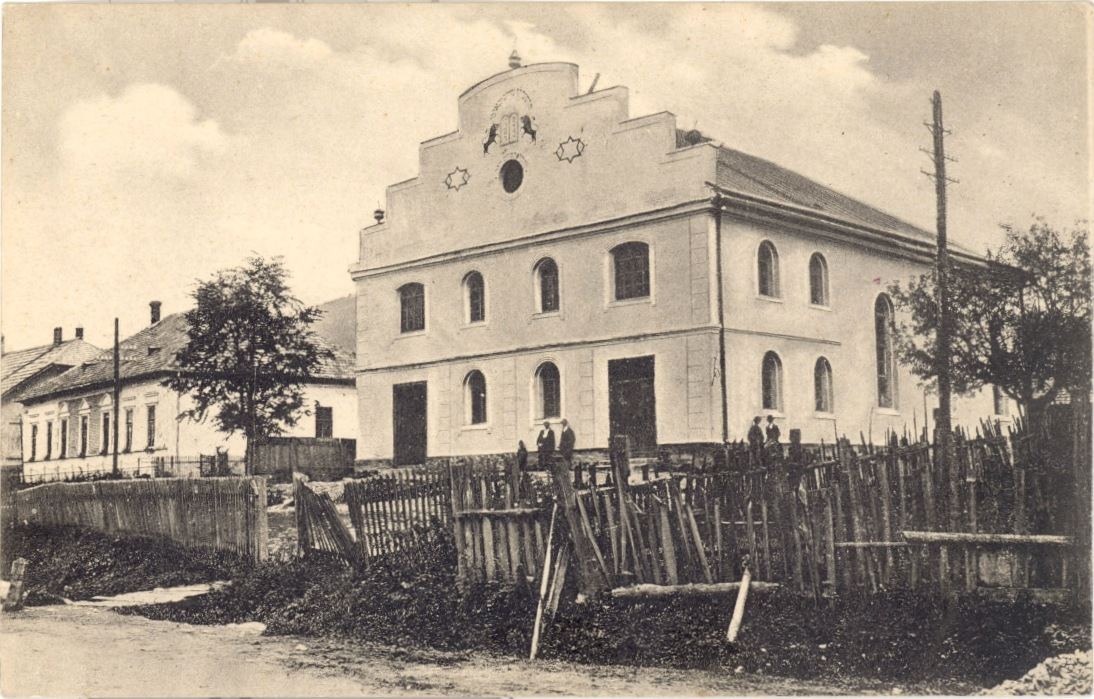
Synagogue
