= Studené =

- Municipality
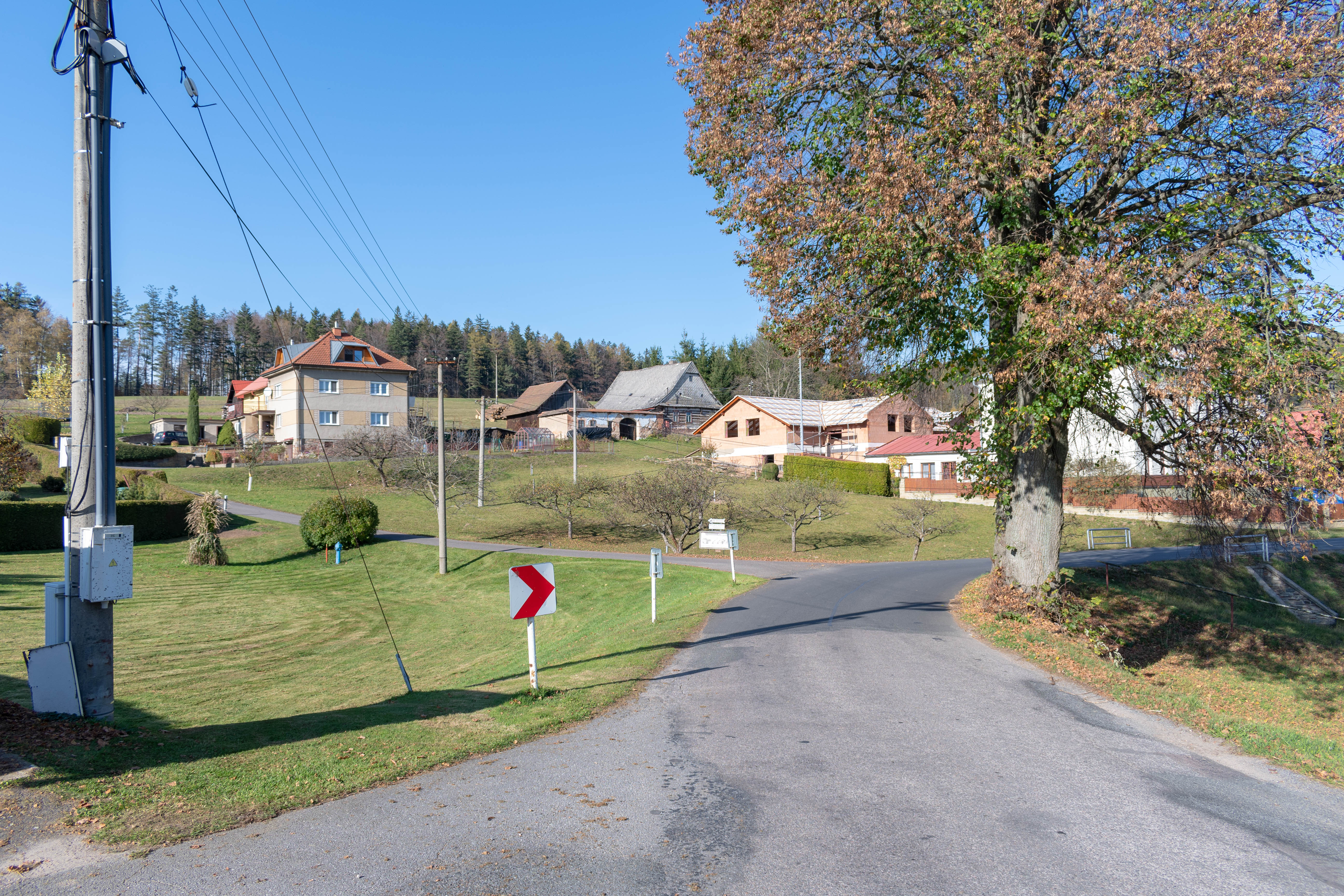
- General view

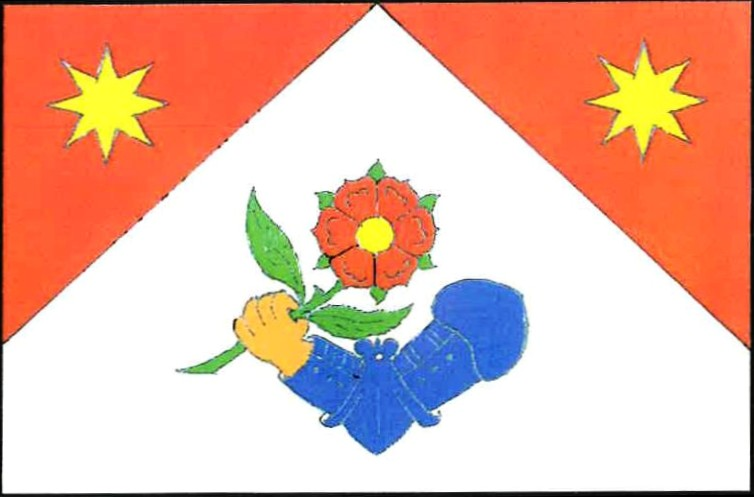
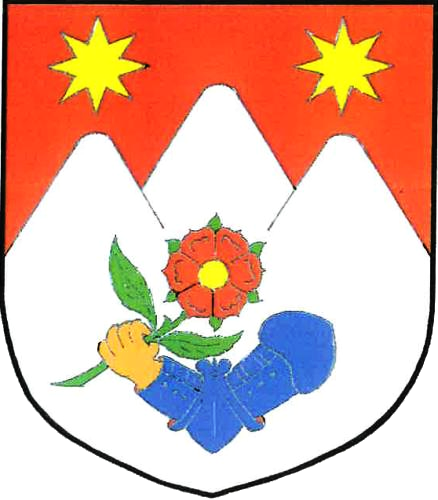
- Flag Coat of arms

- Location in the Czech Republic
- Coordinates: 50°4′0″N 16°35′21″E
- Country: Czech Republic
- Region: Pardubice
- District: Ústí nad Orlicí
- First mentioned: 1670

Area
  - Total: 5.42 km^{2} (2.09 sq mi)
- Elevation: 547 m (1,795 ft)

Population (2026-01-01)
  - Total: 187
  - Density: 34.5/km^{2} (89.4/sq mi)
- Time zone: UTC+1 (CET)
  - Summer (DST): UTC+2 (CEST)
- Postal code: 561 64
- Website: www.studene.cz

Studené (German: Studeney) is a municipality and village in Ústí nad Orlicí District in the Pardubice Region of the Czech Republic. It has about 200 inhabitants.

Studené lies approximately 18 kilometres (11 mi) north-east of Ústí nad Orlicí, 58 km (36 mi) east of Pardubice, and 155 km (96 mi) east of Prague.

== Administrative division ==
Studené consists of two municipal parts (in brackets population according to the 2021 census):

- Studené (113)
- Bořitov (71)

== Demographics ==
Historical population
Year	Pop.	±%
1869	420	—
1880	463	+10.2%
1890	474	+2.4%
1900	470	−0.8%
1910	459	−2.3%
1921	389	−15.3%
1930	331	−14.9%
1950	244	−26.3%
1961	229	−6.1%
1970	213	−7.0%
1980	187	−12.2%
1991	153	−18.2%
2001	160	+4.6%
2011	154	−3.7%
2021	184	+19.5%
Source: Censuses
