= Grushevo =

Grushevo Грушево
- Selo
- Location within Astrakhan Oblast Location within Russia
- Coordinates: 46°05′N 48°28′E
- Country: Russia
- Region: Astrakhan Oblast
- District: Kamyzyaksky District
- Time zone: UTC+4:00

Grushevo (Russian: Грушево) is a rural locality (a selo) in Novotuzukleysky Selsoviet, Kamyzyaksky District, Astrakhan Oblast, Russia. The population was 400 as of 2010. There are 3 streets.

== Geography ==
Grushevo is located 53 km east of Kamyzyak (the district's administrative centre) by road. Sizova Griva is the nearest rural locality.
