= Dibrova, Zhytomyr Oblast =

Rural locality in Zhytomyr Oblast, Ukraine

Dibrova Діброва
- Rural settlement
- Location within Zhytomyr Oblast Location within Ukraine
- Coordinates: 51.1603°N 27.9728°E
- Country: Ukraine
- Oblast: Zhytomyr Oblast
- Raion: Korosten Raion
- Time zone: UTC+2 (EET)
  - Summer (DST): UTC+3 (EEST)

Dibrova (Ukrainian: Діброва) is a rural settlement in Korosten Raion, Zhytomyr Oblast, Ukraine. Population: 121 (2022 estimate) In 2001, population was 197.

== History ==
The area was strongly contaminated as the result of the Chernobyl disaster, and Dibrova was included in 1989 into the zone of mandatory resettlement. The population was partially but not fully resettled.

Until 26 January 2024, Dibrova was designated urban-type settlement. On this day, a new law entered into force which abolished this status, and Dibrova became a rural settlement.
