= Vyshkovo =

Rural locality in Zakarpattia Oblast, Ukraine

Vyshkovo Вишково
- Rural settlement
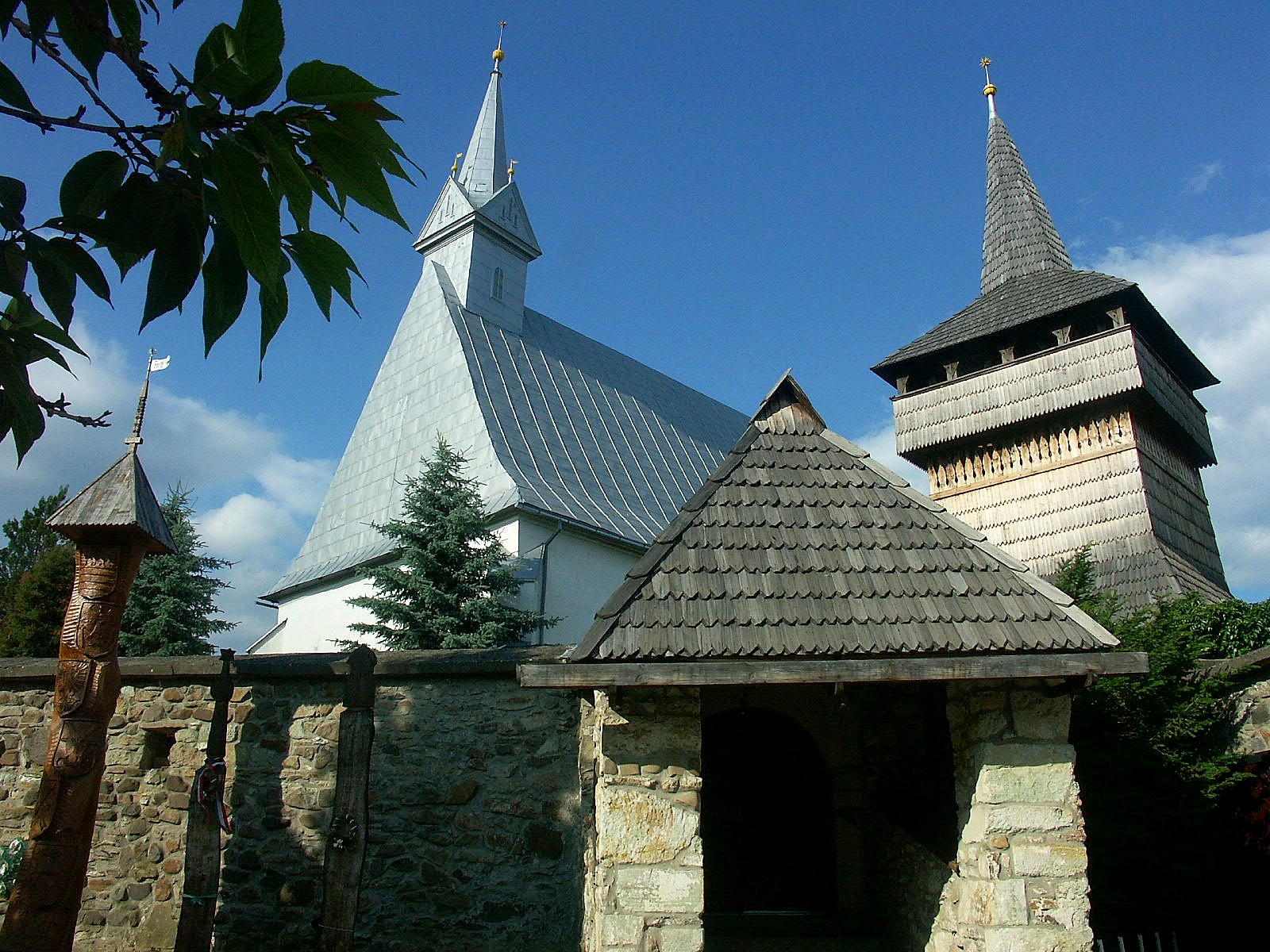
- Reformed Church in Vyshkovo

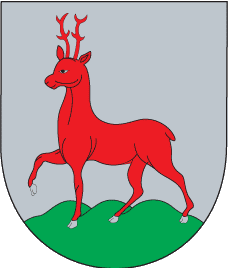
- Coat of arms
- Interactive map of Vyshkovo
- Location of Vyshkovo in Zakarpattia Oblast Location of Vyshkovo in Ukraine
- Coordinates: 48°01′44″N 23°25′55″E
- Country: Ukraine
- Oblast: Zakarpattia Oblast
- Raion: Khust Raion
- Hromada: Vyshkovo settlement hromada
- First mentioned: 1281
- Town status: 1976

Government
  - Town Head: Karlo Soikov
- Elevation: 190 m (620 ft)

Population (2022)
  - Total: ▼8,193
- Time zone: UTC+2 (EET)
  - Summer (DST): UTC+3 (EEST)
- Postal code: 90454
- Area code: +380 3142
- Website: http://rada.gov.ua/

Vyshkovo (Ukrainian: Вишково; Hungarian: Visk) is a rural settlement in Khust Raion, Zakarpattia Oblast, western Ukraine. It is first mentioned in the year 1281. The town's population was 8,142 as of the 2001 Ukrainian Census. Current population: 8,193 (2022 estimate). In 2001 45% of the population was of ethnic Hungarian origin.

Vyshkovo is located in the historic region of Northern Máramaros, along the banks of the Tisza River near modern-day Romania. In the past, its location was suited for a castle, although almost nothing remains of it today except for some fortification remnants.

== History ==
Until 26 January 2024, Vyshkovo was designated urban-type settlement. On this day, a new law entered into force which abolished this status, and Vyshkovo became a rural settlement.

== Gallery ==
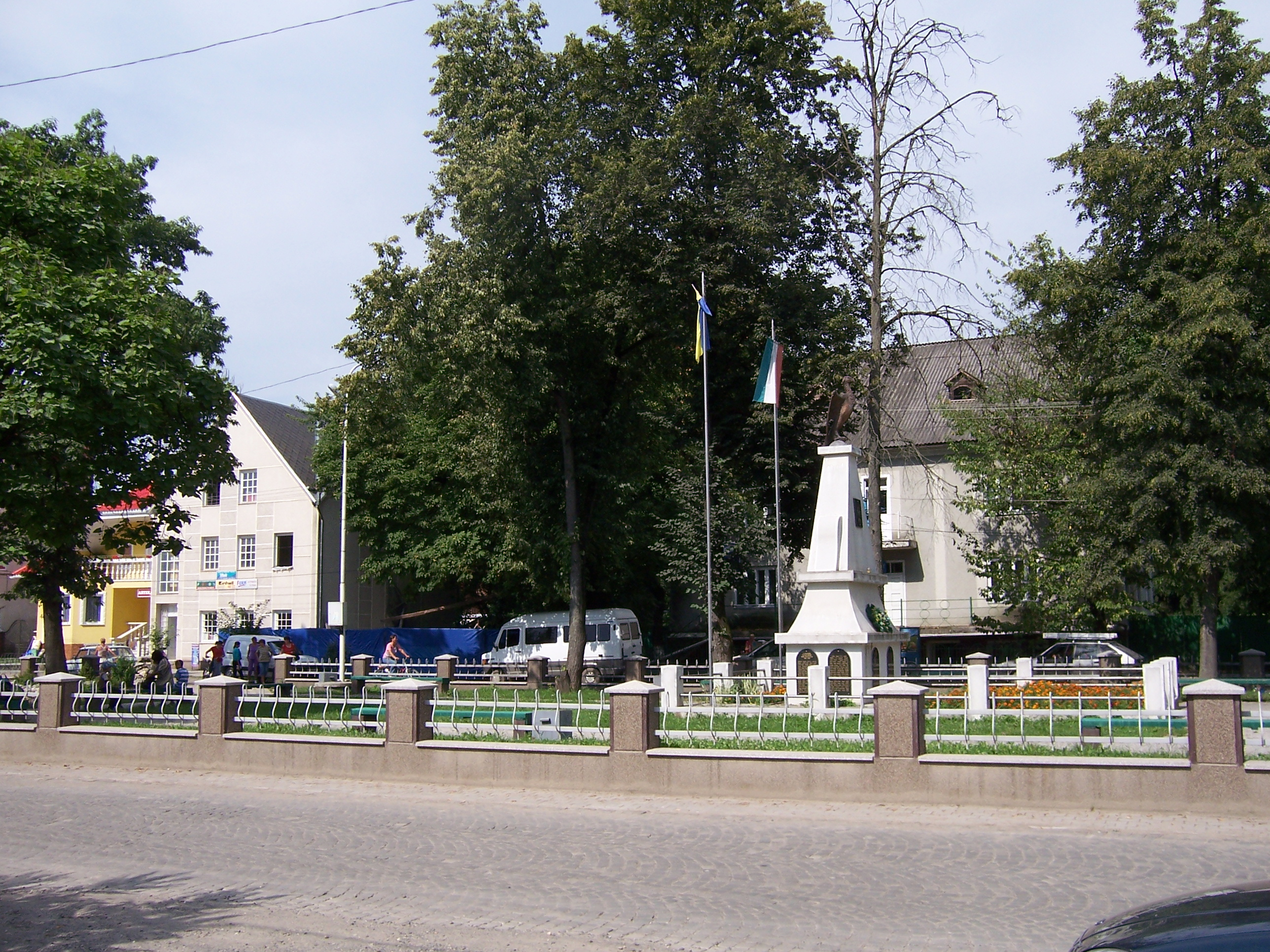
Vyshkovo Central Park

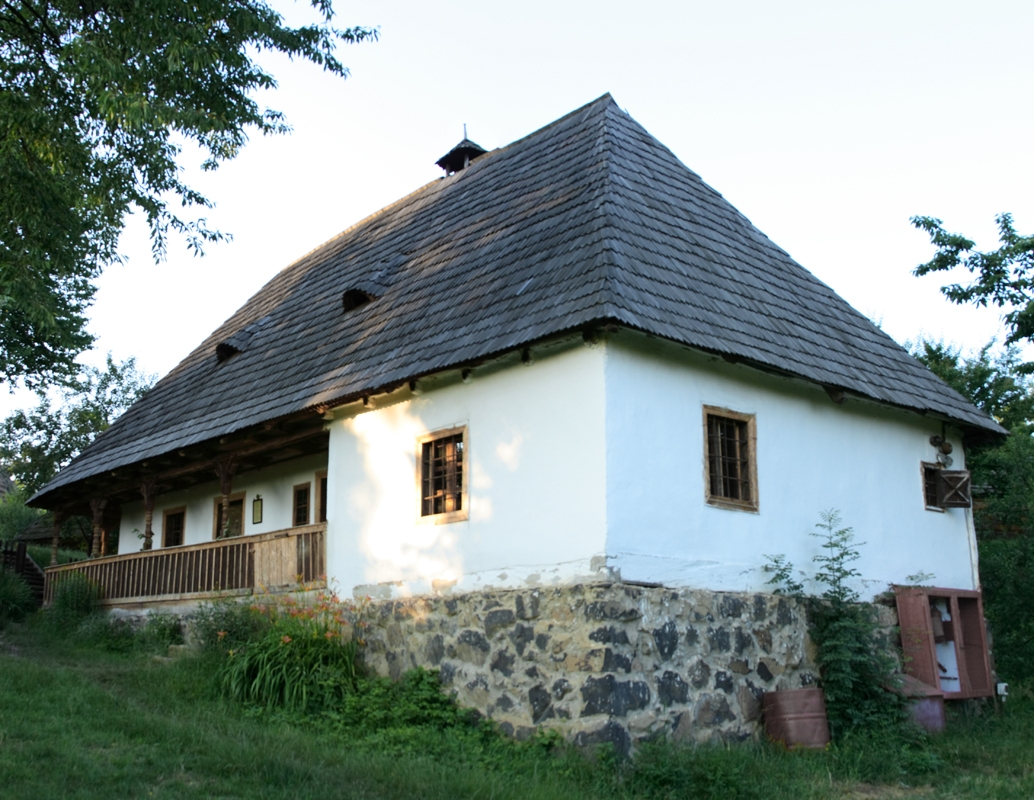
A house from Vyshkovo, now stationed in the Museum of Folk Architecture and Life, Uzhhorod
