= Ugocsa County =

County of the Kingdom of Hungary

Ugocsa County: Comitatus Ugotsensis (Latin); Ugocsa vármegye (Hungarian); Komitat Ugotsch (German); Комітат Уґоча (Rusyn); Comitatul Ugocea (Romanian)
- County of: Kingdom of Hungary (14th century – 1544); County of the Eastern Hungarian Kingdom (1544–1561); County of the Kingdom of Hungary (1561–1606); County of the Principality of Transylvania (1606–1606); County of the Kingdom of Hungary (1606–1621); County of the Principality of Transylvania (1621–1629); County of the Kingdom of Hungary (1629–1645); County of the Principality of Transylvania (1645–1648); County of the Kingdom of Hungary (1648–1785, 1790–1850, 1860–1920, 1940–1945)
- Coat of arms

- Ugocsa County in the Kingdom of Hungary (highlighted in darker grey)
- Capital: Nagyszőllős
- Area
  - Coordinates: 48°8′N 23°2′E
  - 1910: 1,213 km^{2} (468 sq mi)
- Population
  - 1910: 91,755
- History
  - Established: 14th century
  - Merged into Bereg-Ugocsa County: 1785
  - County recreated: 1790
  - Merged into Bereg County: 1850
  - County recreated: 1860
  - Treaty of Trianon: 4 June 1920
  - Merged into Szatmár-Ugocsa-Bereg County: 1923
  - Merged into Bereg-Ugocsa County (First Vienna Award): 2 November 1938
  - County recreated (Second Vienna Award): 30 August 1940
  - Merged into Szatmár-Bereg County: 1945
- Today part of: Ukraine; Romania
- Vynohradiv is the current name of the capital.

Ugocsa was an administrative county (comitatus) of the Kingdom of Hungary. Its territory is now in north-western Romania (1/4) and western Ukraine (3/4). The capital of the county was Nagyszőllős (now Vynohradiv, Ukraine). It was the smallest among the counties of historical Hungary.

== Geography ==
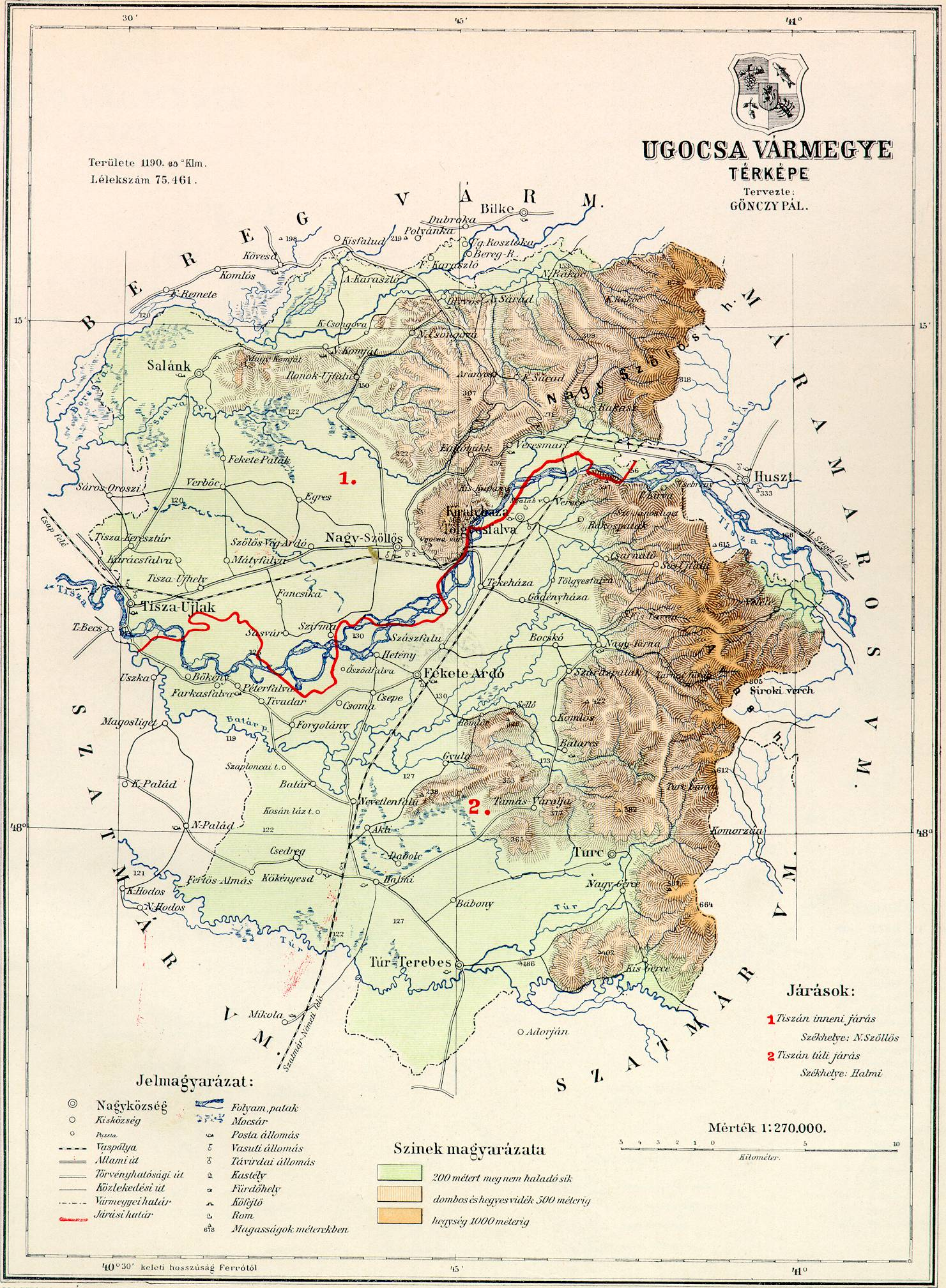
Map of Ugocsa, 1891.

Ugocsa county shared borders with the Hungarian counties Máramaros, Szatmár and Bereg. It was situated on both sides of the river Tisza. Its area was 1208 km^{2} around 1910.

== History ==
In 1920, by the Treaty of Trianon most of the county (including Nagyszőllős) became part of newly formed Czechoslovakia, while a very little part remained in Hungary were joined to Szatmár County, which was merged to Szatmár-Ugocsa-Bereg County in 1923. The southern part – including Halmi (today Halmeu) – became part of Romania. In 1938, the western part of the former Czechoslovak part was returned to Hungary by the First Vienna Award, which became part of the newly formed Bereg-Ugocsa County – as Szatmár County was recreated – but shortly in 1939 the rest became part of Hungary again as the remainder of Carpathian Ruthenia was annexed after Czechoslovakia ceased to exist. These part were assigned to the administrative branch offices of Máramaros. In 1940, by the Second Vienna Award the southern part as well returned to Hungary thus the county was recreated with a modified territory, with the parts also included earlier to the administrative branch offices of Máramaros. The capital again became Nagyszőllős.

After World War II, the formerly Czechoslovak part of Ugocsa county became part of the Soviet Union, Ukrainian SSR, Zakarpattia Oblast. Since 1991, when the Soviet Union split up, the Zakarpattia Oblast has been part of Ukraine. The southern part of the county became part of Romania again and is now part of the Romanian county Satu Mare.

== Demographics ==
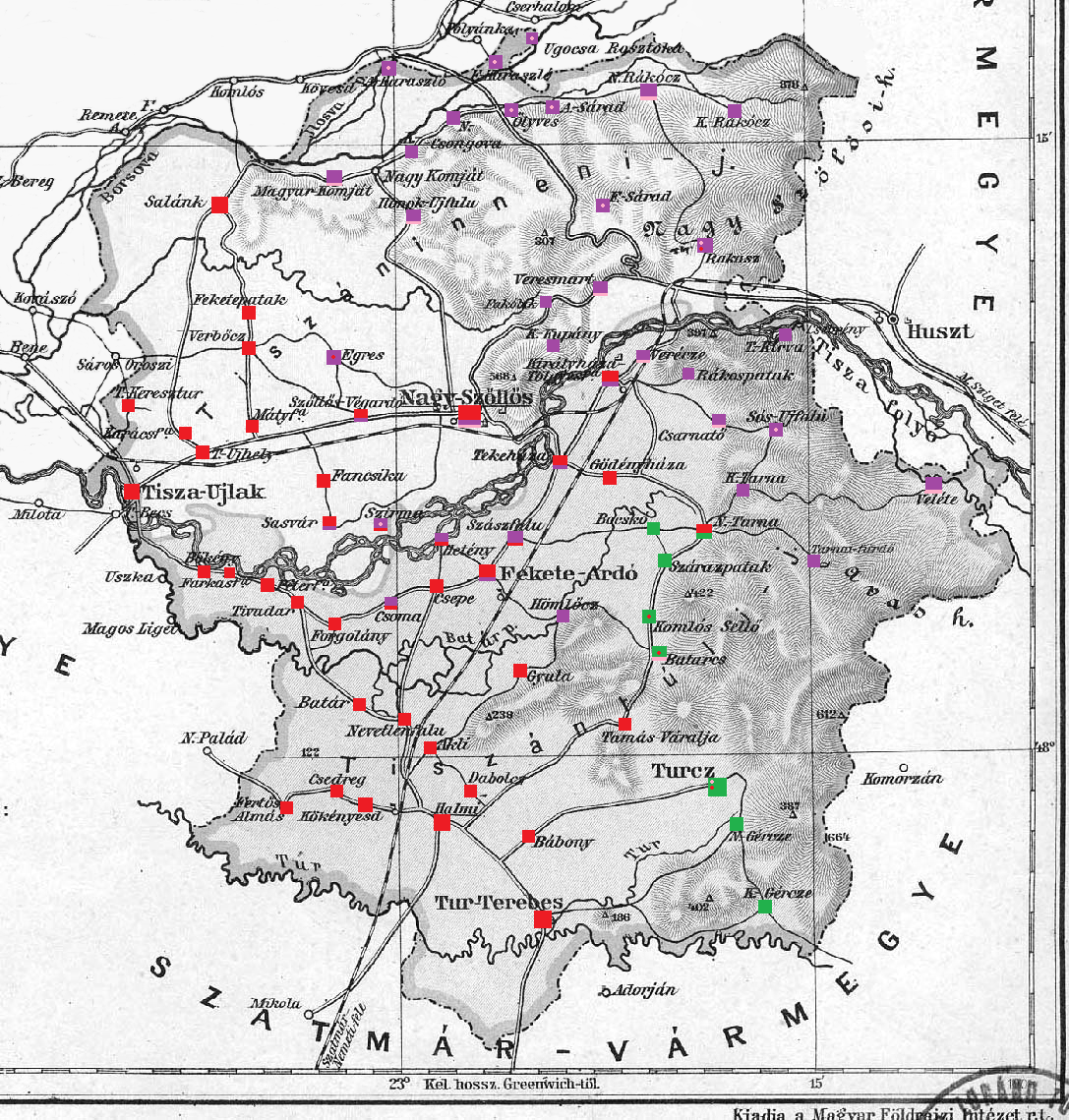
Ethnic map of the county with data of the 1910 census (see the key in the description).

Population by native language (Note: Only linguistic communities comprising at least 1% of the population are displayed.)
Census	Total	Hungarian	Ruthenian	Romanian	German	Other or unknown
1880	65,377	22,664 (35.67%)	29,976 (47.17%)	8,183 (12.88%)	2,409 (3.79%)	314 (0.49%)
1890	75,461	28,852 (38.23%)	32,076 (42.51%)	8,830 (11.70%)	5,447 (7.22%)	256 (0.34%)
1900	83,316	35,702 (42.85%)	32,721 (39.27%)	9,270 (11.13%)	5,505 (6.61%)	118 (0.14%)
1910	91,755	42,677 (46.51%)	34,415 (37.51%)	9,750 (10.63%)	4,632 (5.05%)	281 (0.31%)

Population by religion (Note: Only religious communities comprising at least 1% of the population are displayed.)
Census	Total	Greek Catholic	Calvinist	Jewish	Roman Catholic	Other or unknown
1880	65,377	41,808 (63.95%)	10,246 (15.67%)	7,835 (11.98%)	5,394 (8.25%)	94 (0.14%)
1890	75,461	47,651 (63.15%)	11,722 (15.53%)	9,414 (12.48%)	6,201 (8.22%)	473 (0.63%)
1900	83,316	52,417 (62.91%)	12,928 (15.52%)	10,566 (12.68%)	7,264 (8.72%)	141 (0.17%)
1910	91,755	57,550 (62.72%)	14,002 (15.26%)	11,850 (12.91%)	8,173 (8.91%)	180 (0.20%)

== Subdivisions ==
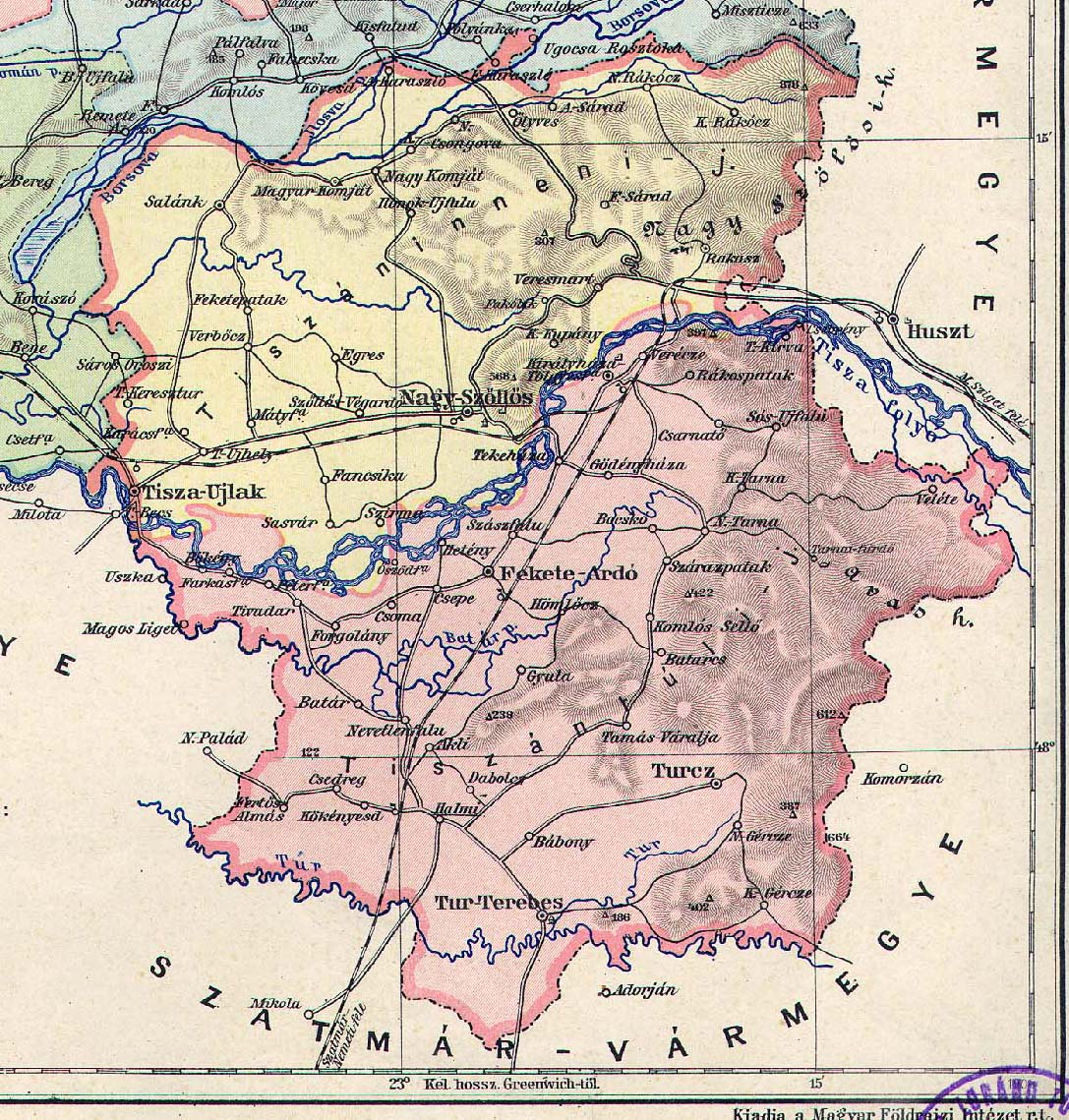

In the early 20th century, the subdivisions of Ugocsa county were:

Districts (járás)
District	Capital
Tiszáninnen	Nagyszőllős (now Vynohradiv)
Tiszántúl	Halmi (now Halmeu)

Vynohradiv is now in Ukraine; Halmeu is now in Romania.
