= 2018 Queen's Birthday Honours (Australia) =

The 2018 Queen's Birthday Honours for Australia were announced on 11 June 2018 by the Governor-General, Sir Peter Cosgrove.

The Birthday Honours were appointments by some of the 16 Commonwealth realms of Queen Elizabeth II to various orders and honours to reward and highlight good works by citizens of those countries. The Birthday Honours are awarded as part of the Queen's Official Birthday celebrations during the month of June.

== Order of Australia ==
General division ribbon

Military division ribbon

=== Companion of the Order of Australia (AC) ===
==== General Division ====
- Professor Rose Amal – For eminent service to chemical engineering, particularly in the field of particle technology, through seminal contributions to photocatalysis, to education as a researcher and academic, and to women in science as a role model and mentor.
- Jill Elizabeth Bilcock – For eminent service to the Australian motion picture industry as a film editor, to the promotion and development of the profession, as a role model, and through creative contributions to the nation's cultural identity.
- The Honourable Catherine Margaret Branson, QC – For eminent service to the judiciary as a Judge of the Federal Court of Australia, to the law as an advocate for human rights and civil liberties, to judicial administration and professional development, and to governance roles in tertiary education.
- Professor Geoffrey Burnstock – For eminent service to biological sciences in the field of pharmacology and toxicology as an academic, author and mentor, through pioneering research into purinergic signalling pathways in mammalian systems, and through medical research.
- The late Professor David Albert Cooper, AO, deceased – For eminent service to medicine, particularly in the area of HIV/AIDS research, as a clinician, scientist and administrator, to the development of treatment therapies, and to health programs in South East Asia and the Pacific.
- Dawn Fraser, AO, MBE – For eminent service to sport, through ambassadorial, mentoring, and non-executive roles with a range of organisations at all levels, and to the community through roles in conservation and motoring associations.
- Emeritus Professor Geoffrey Colin Harcourt, AO – For eminent service to higher education as an academic economist and author, particularly in the fields of Post-Keynesian economics, capital theory and economic thought.
- Erica Lee Smyth – For eminent service to the community through corporate governance roles with charitable, medical research, higher education, nuclear scientific and technology organisations, to the minerals exploration sector, and to women in business.
- Emeritus Professor Virginia Margaret Spate – For eminent service to higher education, particularly to art history and theory and to the advanced study of the contemporary arts, as an academic, author and curator, and as a role model for young art historians.
- Professor San Hoa Thang – For eminent service to science, and to higher education, particularly in the fields of polymer chemistry and materials science, through seminal contributions as a research innovator, as a mentor, and to the community.

=== Officer of the Order of Australia (AO) ===
==== General Division ====
- David Westbrook Anstice — For distinguished service to Australia-America business relations, particularly in the pharmaceutical field, through roles with multinational and educational organisations.
- Joseph Assaf — For distinguished service to multiculturalism, and to business, as a supporter of community education projects for people from linguistically diverse backgrounds, and to cultural harmony and inclusion.
- Susan Mary Baddeley — For distinguished service to child health as an academic and researcher, to neo-natal paediatric medicine, and to the Indigenous community of the Northern Territory.
- Julie Louise Bates — For distinguished service to community health, particularly through harm reduction programs for sex workers and people with substance abuse issues, and to those living with HIV/AIDS.
- Maxwell John Beck — For distinguished service to the community through philanthropic and fundraising support for medical, sporting, social welfare and cultural organisations, and to urban revitalisation.
- Rinaldo Bellomo — For distinguished service to intensive care medicine as a biomedical scientist and researcher, through infrastructure and systems development to manage the critically ill, and as an author.
- Jennifer May Bowker — For distinguished service to Australia-Middle East cultural relations through the preservation of traditional creative and visual arts, and as a textile artist and educator.
- Susan Margaret Butler — For distinguished service to the community as a lexicographer and author, as a facilitator of academic discourse on Australian English language, and to commercial publishing.
- Suzanne Kathleen Chambers — For distinguished service to medical research, particularly in the area of psycho-oncology, and to community health through patient care strategies to assist men with prostate cancer.
- David John Cook — For distinguished service to the technological sciences, and to engineering, through corporate governance roles, and to the building and construction sector.
- Robin Mary Creyke — For distinguished service to administrative law, and to education, as an academic and author, to public administration and tribunal practice, and to professional bodies.
- Rebecca Anne Davies — For distinguished service to the community, and to medical research, particularly in the areas of juvenile diabetes and heart health, and to the Catholic Archdiocese of Sydney.
- Harvey Albert Dillon — For distinguished service to science, and to engineering, as a researcher in the field of hearing loss assessment, electrophysiology, and rehabilitation, and to improved auditory technologies.
- Terence John Effeney — For distinguished service to the energy supply sector, particularly in Queensland, through planning and delivery programs, to infrastructure management, and to the community.
- Paul Robertson Espie — For distinguished service to the mining and infrastructure sectors through financial advisory roles, to public policy development and reform, and to not-for-profit organisations.
- Joan Kyrle Evans — For distinguished service to the international community of Thailand through humanitarian assistance programs for the disadvantaged, and to improving the lives of women, children and the elderly.
- Christopher Kincaid Fairley — For distinguished service to community health, particularly in the area of infectious and sexually transmitted diseases, as a clinician, researcher and administrator, and to medical education.
- Kurt Harry Fearnley, OAM — For distinguished service to people with a disability, as a supporter of, and fundraiser for, Indigenous athletics and charitable organisations, and as a Paralympic athlete.
- Peter John Fitzpatrick — For distinguished service to the community, particularly in Western Australia, through roles with veterans' welfare, business, legal and not-for-profit organisations, and to social justice.
- John W Freebairn — For distinguished service to education in the field of applied economics, as an academic, administrator and author, and to policy development, particularly taxation reform.
- Frances Irene Gentle — For distinguished service to people who are blind or have low vision, particularly in the area of special education, and to policy development and practice on inclusiveness and standards.
- Thomas Edmund Gleisner — For distinguished service to the media and television industries as a writer, producer, actor and presenter, to children living with cancer, and as a supporter of young people with autism spectrum disorders.
- John Patrick Grace — For distinguished service to science in the field of biotechnology research and commercialisation, through advisory roles, and to professional scientific associations.
- Anne Patricia Graham — For distinguished service to higher education, particularly in the area of childhood studies, as an academic, researcher and author, and to child protection.
- Catherine Elizabeth Grenville — For distinguished service to the literary arts as an author, to the tertiary education sector, to professional societies, and as an advocate for the publishing industry.
- Robert Leo Handby — For distinguished service to the international community, particularly with humanitarian disaster assistance missions, and the environmental health profession.
- Mark Fort Harris — For distinguished service to education, and to the community, in the area of public health care, evidence-based practice, and equity, as an academic and researcher, and to refugees.
- John Charles Higgins — For distinguished service to the community through philanthropic contributions to education, cultural, social welfare, and child cancer support organisations, and to business.
- Linda Jackson — For distinguished service to the Australian fashion industry as a textile artist and clothing designer, and as a teacher and mentor of Indigenous artists in northern Australia.
- Natalie H M Jeremijenko — For distinguished service to the arts, and to higher education, as an academic, through pioneering contributions to architecture, technology, the sciences, and engineering, and to rural and urban design.
- Emma Letitia Johnston — For distinguished service to higher education, particularly to marine ecology and ecotoxicology, as an academic, researcher and administrator, and to scientific institutes.
- Jennifer Margaret Kee — For distinguished service to the Australian fashion industry as a textile artist and clothing designer, and through contributions to the environment and conservation.
- John Charles Kerin — For distinguished service to primary industry through roles in agricultural research administration, to the minerals and natural resources sector, and to science-industry linkages and policy.
- Barry Francis Kirby — For distinguished service to Australia-Papua New Guinea relations through the development and delivery of maternal health medical assistance programs.
- Sydney Lorrimar Kirkby, MBE — For distinguished service to surveying, particularly in the Antarctic, to polar exploration, research and mapping expeditions, and to professional scientific societies.
- Robyn Caroline Kruk, AM — For distinguished service to public administration, particularly through mental health reform, to environmental protection and natural resource management, and to food standards.
- Timothy Charles Lindsey — For distinguished service to international relations, particularly in promoting understanding between Indonesia and Australia, as an academic, and to legal education in Islamic law.
- Kenneth John Maher — For distinguished service to architecture and landscape design, particularly through urban infrastructure projects, and to environmental sustainability in planning.
- Vernon Charles Marshall — For distinguished service to medicine, particularly to renal transplant surgery and organ preservation, to accreditation and professional standards, as an academic, author and clinician.
- James McCluskey — For distinguished service to medical education, as an academic in immunology, and through research into immune systems response to viruses.
- John George McHutchison — For distinguished service to medical research in gastroenterology and hepatology, particularly through the development of treatments for viral infections, and to the biopharmaceutical industry.
- Samantha Doreen Meers — For distinguished service to the community through philanthropic support for arts programs and cultural institutions, and to a range of charitable organisations.
- Bruce James Miller — For distinguished service to public administration through diplomatic roles and bilateral trade agreements, and to fostering cultural and strategic partnerships with Japan.
- Christine Anne Milne — For distinguished service to the Australian and Tasmanian Parliaments, and through domestic and global contributions to the protection and preservation of the natural environment.
- Jane Elizabeth Montgomery-Hribar — For distinguished service to the building and construction sector, particularly in the areas of project procurement and industry standards, through executive roles, and as a mentor of women.
- Alan Gregory Morris — For distinguished service to the international community through financial policy, particularly to the Pacific region through advisory roles in fiscal responsibility and economic reform.
- Gregory Philip Mullins, AFSM — For distinguished service to the community of New South Wales through leadership in fire-fighting, to the emergency response sector, and to gender equity in recruitment.
- John (Jock) Stephen Murray — For distinguished service to the transport, infrastructure and freight industries, through roles in policy direction, planning and implementation, and to Jesuit education.
- Paula Ruth Nathan — For distinguished service to community health as a psychologist, particularly to understanding mental health disorders, and to establishing specialised treatment and support services.
- David Charles Pescud — For distinguished service to medicine, and to Australia-Mongolia relations, particularly through the provision of surgical and anaesthetic care, and to health education and standards.
- Susan Mary Provan — For distinguished service to arts administration through festival leadership and governance, to the tourism sector in Victoria, and to the promotion of Australian comedy.
- Michael Francis Quinlan — For distinguished service to medicine, particularly through strategic leadership in the development of tertiary medical and social education in Western Australia as an academic and clinician.
- Alice Dorothy (Alitya) Rigney — For distinguished service to education, particularly through providing opportunities for youth, and to the promotion and protection of Indigenous language, culture and heritage.
- Halina Rubinsztein-Dunlop — For distinguished service to laser physics and nano-optics as a researcher, mentor and academic, to the promotion of educational programs, and to women in science.
- Christobel Mary Saunders — For distinguished service to medical education in the field of surgical oncology, to the diagnosis and management of breast cancer and melanoma, as an academic, researcher and clinician.
- Roberta Barkworth Shepherd — For distinguished service to education, specifically to paediatric physiotherapy and stroke rehabilitation, as an academic and author, and to professional medical bodies.
- Julie Singer Scanlan — For distinguished service to Australia-America relations through the promotion and facilitation of dialogue and information exchange across government, business and community sectors.
- Andrew Sisson — For distinguished service to the finance and investment sector, as an advisor to financial regulatory bodies, and through philanthropic support for cultural and charitable groups.
- Sever Sternhell — For distinguished service to education in the field of organic chemistry, specifically to nuclear magnetic resonance, as an academic and researcher, and to scientific institutions.
- Donald Edwin Stewart — For distinguished service to education as an academic and researcher, and to Australia-Indonesia relations through public health improvement projects.
- Christian Andrew Thompson — For distinguished service to the visual arts as a sculptor, photographer, video and performance artist, and as a role model for young Indigenous artists.
- Katherine Mary Tucker — For distinguished service to medicine in the field of familial cancer genetics, as a clinician, researcher and author, to medical education, and to professional bodies.
- Frank John Vajda — For distinguished service to medical education in the field of clinical pharmacology and the genetics of epilepsy, and to the promotion of humanitarian values.
- Susan Philippa Walker — For distinguished service to medicine, particularly in the disciplines of obstetrics and gynaecology, as an academic and clinician, and to professional organisations.
- Gungwu Wang, CBE — For distinguished service to tertiary education as an academic and researcher, particularly to far eastern history and the study of the Chinese diaspora, and to the enhancement of Australia-Asia relations.
- Jennifer Anne Westacott — For distinguished service to private and public sector administration through executive roles, to policy development and reform, to cross sector collaboration, to equity, and to business.
- Paul Richard Wood — For distinguished service to science, and to global human and animal health, and through biopharmaceutical research and technological advances.
- Ortrun Zuber-Skerritt — For distinguished service to tertiary education in the field of action research and learning as an academic, author and mentor, and to professional bodies.

==== Military Division ====
Navy

- Rear Admiral Michael Joseph Noonan, AM, RAN – For distinguished service to the Royal Australian Navy in significant command positions.

Army

- Major General Fergus Andrew McLachlan, AM – For distinguished service in the appointments of Head Modernisation and Strategic Plans – Army, Commander Forces Command and significant contributions to the Australian Army and modernisation as part of the joint Australian Defence Force for Australia's interests.
- Major General Paul David McLachlan, AM, CSC – For distinguished service in the appointments of Head Land Systems Division, Commander of the 1st Division and significant contributions to Army strategic command and control capabilities within the Australian Defence Force.

=== Member of the Order of Australia (AM) ===
==== General Division ====
- Leonard Hastings Ainsworth — For significant service to business and manufacturing, and to the community through philanthropic contributions.
- Colin James Allen — For significant service to people who are deaf or hard of hearing through national and international leadership and advocacy roles.
- Donald Ian Allen — For significant service to education through roles in the development of public policy and accreditation standards.
- Dianne Elizabeth Anderson — For significant service to the community through support for not-for-profit choral societies and music events.
- Teresa Maree Anderson — For service to community health, and to public administration in New South Wales, as a clinician, manager and health service executive.
- Peter Clive Aspinal — For significant service to veterans and their families, particularly through commemorative events in Western Australia.
- Michael Jeffrey Atherton — For significant service to the performing arts, particularly through music composition, performance and education.
- Rodney John Baber — For significant service to medicine in the field of obstetrics and gynaecology as a clinician and researcher.
- Glenn A. Baker — For significant service to the entertainment industry through promoting, preserving and documenting popular music culture.
- Sue Elizabeth Baker — For significant service to tertiary education in the visual and creative arts, particularly through advancing scholarship and research opportunities.
- Anne Patricia Banks-McAllister — For significant service to women through roles advancing gender equality, particularly in local government.
- Geoffrey Russell Batkin — For significant service to the community through social and aged welfare organisations, and to the Uniting Church in Australia.
- Noel Bernard Bayley — For significant service to medicine in the field of cardiology, and to the diagnosis and treatment of heart disease in Timor-Leste.
- Karyn Lee Baylis — For significant service to the Indigenous community through the development of entrepreneurial initiatives and business programs.
- Anita Belgiorno-Nettis — For significant service to the community through support and philanthropic contributions to social welfare and arts organisations.
- Robert Percival Benn — For significant service to the Presbyterian Church of Australia as a parish minister, overseas missionary and national moderator.
- Diane Elizabeth Bennit — For significant service to equestrian sports as a competitor and coach, and to the horse industry as a commentator and administrator.
- Wallace Bishop — For significant service to the community through a range of roles, to business, and to the retail industry.
- Danielle Eva Blain — For significant service to business and commerce, to politics in Western Australia, and to women.
- Robert Andrew Bradley — For significant service to sport through management and community development, and as an advocate for health and water safety initiatives.
- Barbara Gillian Briggs — For significant service to science and research as a botanist, to documenting Australian flora, and to professional societies.
- Alan John Brown — For significant service to the vocational training and education sector, to philanthropy, and to the people and Parliament of Victoria.
- Anthony Frank Brown — For significant service to emergency medicine as a clinician, author and educator, and to professional organisations.
- Mark Ashley Brown — For significant service to medicine in the field of nephrology, and to medical research, particularly hypertension in pregnancy.
- Helen Margaret Brownlee — For significant service to sports administration, to women as an advocate for greater participation in sport, and to the Olympic movement.
- Carol Buckley — For significant service to the Crown, and to public administration in Western Australia.
- Frank Edgell Bush — For significant service to business, particularly to improving standards of corporate governance across the private, public and not-for-profit sectors.
- Richard James Butler — For significant service to basketball as a senior executive and administrator, and as an advocate for gender equality in development and competition.
- John Alexander Byrne — For significant service to library and information management through initiatives to develop access to global and Indigenous resources.
- Brian George Cadd — For significant service to the music industry as a singer, songwriter, performer, mentor and producer, and to professional associations.
- Joseph John Caddy — For significant service to the community through a range of social welfare initiatives and policy reforms, and to the Catholic Church in Australia.
- John Lachlan Cameron — For significant service to the community through a range of roles in the disability and the not-for-profit sectors, and to politics and public policy.
- David Charles Caple — For significant service to community health through workplace health and safety reforms and ergonomic policy development.
- Jonathan Rhys Carapetis — For significant service to medicine in the field of paediatrics, particularly the diagnosis, treatment and prevention of rheumatic heart disease.
- Peter John Casey — For significant service to the performing arts through contributions to musical theatre as a conductor and musical director.
- Ross Cameron Chambers — For significant service to education through a range of senior academic roles, and to providing tertiary opportunities in regional areas.
- Geoffrey David Champion — For significant service to medicine in the field of paediatric rheumatology, and to medical research and treatment of musculoskeletal pain.
- Arlene Chan — For significant service to medicine in the field of oncology, particularly breast cancer support, diagnosis and treatment.
- Carolyn Frances Chard — For significant service to the performing arts in executive roles, particularly in Western Australia, and to support for young artists.
- Iain James Clarke — For significant service to medicine in the field of endocrinology and neuroendocrinology, and to medical research into reproductive biology.
- McKenzie Alexander Clements — For significant service to tertiary education through mathematics research and instruction as an academic, author and mentor.
- Gerard David Condon — For significant service to dentistry through executive roles with professional bodies at state and national level.
- Michael Gerard Cooper — For significant service to medicine in the field of anaesthesia as a clinician, teacher, mentor and historian.
- John William Cotter — For significant service to the resources sector, particularly the natural gas industry, through executive positions and advisory roles.
- Terry Ann Cranwell — For significant service to parliament and politics in Queensland, and to women in rural and regional communities.
- Linda Kay Crebbin — For significant service to the law and to the legal profession in the Australian Capital Territory.
- Andrew Irvine Cockett — For significant service to the law particularly to legal aid services, to education, and to the community.
- Anne Therese Cross — For significant service to the community through social welfare organisations in the government and not-for-profit sectors, and to women.
- Bernard Francis Curran — For significant service to tertiary education, particularly through higher learning opportunities for young people in rural areas.
- Ram Chander Dalal — For significant service to agriculture through research into land degradation and sustainable farming practices.
- Susan Jean Dann — For significant service to business education through commercial marketing techniques to deliver positive social outcomes.
- Mary Dorothy D'Apice — For significant service to the Catholic Church in Australia, and to education.
- Alfred Martin Daubney — For significant service to the law, and to the judiciary, to education, and to the community.
- Elizabeth (Libby) Maria Davies — For significant service to the community through leadership and advisory roles with a range of social welfare organisations.
- Louise Rosalind Davis — For significant service to business in the not-for-profit sector through promoting corporate social responsibility, and to the community.
- Phyllis Mary Davis — For significant service to nursing through clinical, administrative and international advisory roles, and to nurse education.
- David Robert De Silva — For significant service to the community through contributions to the economic and social development of the Northern Territory in a range of executive roles.
- Richard John Dennis — For significant service to the community of South Australia through a range of voluntary organisations, and to the Anglican Church of Australia.
- Paul Vincent Desmond — For significant service to medicine in the field of gastroenterology as a senior clinician and researcher, and to professional associations.
- Julie Anne Dolan — For significant service to football as an administrator, player and coach, and as an ambassador for elite player development and junior participation.
- Margot McDowell Doust — For significant service to the community through equitable access in tertiary education.
- Wendy Eveline Dowling — For significant service to community health, particularly in Western Australia, through support for people living with coeliac disease.
- Stuart Gordon Durward — For significant service to the law and the judiciary, to the provision of legal services to the Australian Defence Force, to education, and to the community.
- Neil Raymond Edwards — For significant service to business and commerce through corporate governance and leadership roles in the public and private sectors.
- Bruce Clifford Elliott — For significant service to sports science as a teacher and researcher specialising in the fields of biomechanics and physical education.
- Anthony Douglas Ellwood — For significant service to the visual arts and to the museums and galleries sector as an administrator and curator.
- Deborah Margaret Ely — For significant service to the visual arts through leadership roles with art galleries, and to children's art education programs.
- Stephen Peter Estcourt — For significant service to the judiciary as a Judge of the Supreme Court of Tasmania, to legal education, and to professional law societies.
- Kerry Francis Eupene — For significant service to dentistry, to the Indigenous community of the Northern Territory, and to agricultural and horticultural associations.
- Lesley Patricia Farrant — For significant service to the community through philanthropic contributions and social welfare roles, and to animal protection.
- Christine Roslind Ferguson — For significant service to the community of Gundagai, to local government, and to parliament and politics in New South Wales.
- David Rowley Fletcher — For significant service to medicine in the field of gastrointestinal surgery as a clinician, educator, researcher, and leader in health service delivery.
- Morry Fraid — For significant service to the community through philanthropic support for a range of charitable organisations and foundations.
- Donna Frater — For significant service to the mining industry, particularly through the promotion of greater gender diversity in the sector.
- Christopher John Freeland — For significant service to the arts in New South Wales particularly to the film industry, to business education, and to the community.
- Jackie Miriana Fristacky — For significant service to local government, and to the community of Melbourne.
- Anthony James Gill — For significant service to medical research in the field of surgical pathology as an academic, author, adviser, and mentor.
- John Colin Gilmour — For significant service to community health in Queensland through governance roles in developing hospital infrastructure in the not-for-profit sector.
- David Charles Goldney — For significant service to tertiary education in the field of environmental science, and to conservation through resource management committees.
- Colin Denis Golvan — For significant service to the law, to legal education, particularly support for Indigenous students, and to the arts through governance and philanthropy.
- Robert Norman Gottliebsen — For significant service to the print media as a journalist, editor and business analyst, and to education through school governance roles.
- Charles Roger Goucke — For significant service to medicine in the field of pain management as a clinician, academic and mentor, and to professional societies.
- Stephen John Gough — For significant service to sports administration and stadium management in Victoria through executive roles.
- Mark A Gower — For service to the Crown, and to public administration in Queensland.
- Kathy Guthadjaka — For significant service to the Indigenous community through contributions to education and cultural preservation in East Arnhem Land.
- Robyn Heather Guymer — For significant service to medicine in the field of ophthalmology, particularly age-related macular degeneration as a clinician, academic and researcher.
- Janice Hadfield — For significant service to hockey as an international umpire, and to professional development of officials.
- Kathryn Harby-Williams — For significant service to netball as a player, national captain, coach, commentator, board member and player's advocate.
- David Edwin Hatt — For significant service to hockey as a senior administrator, to Australian rules football, and to sport in Western Australia.
- John Hatzistergos — For significant service to the law and the judiciary, and to the people and Parliament of New South Wales through a range of ministerial roles.
- Phillip James Heath — For service to education through executive roles, to creating greater opportunities for Indigenous students, and to professional associations.
- Timothy Roger Henderson — For significant service to medicine in the field of ophthalmology, and to Indigenous eye health in the Northern Territory.
- William Eldred Hennessy — For significant service to music as a concert violinist, artistic director, mentor and educator.
- John Charles Hibberd — For significant service to the performing arts through advisory roles, to theatre as a playwright, and through contributions to Australian cultural life.
- David Brynn Hibbert — For significant service to science in the discipline of chemistry, to professional societies, and to sport through illicit drug profiling.
- David Russell Hillman — For significant service to medicine as an anaesthesiologist and physician, to medical research into sleep disorders, and to professional organisations.
- Lawrence William Hirst — For significant service to medicine in the field of ophthalmology through the development of clinical care techniques and eye disease management.
- Bruce David Hodgkinson — For significant service to community health through cancer support and awareness programs, and to rugby union, particularly to player welfare.
- David James Hohnen — For significant service to oenology, to the development of the Australian wine industry, and as a promoter of the Margaret River region.
- Rishelle Nicole Hume — For significant service to the Indigenous community of Western Australia through developing opportunities, promoting leadership and preserving culture.
- Robert John Inverarity — For significant service to education, and to cricket as a player, captain, coach, and national selector.
- Alastair Robert Jackson — For service to the performing arts, particularly to opera, through a range of governance roles, and as a patron and benefactor.
- Kenneth Curt Jenner — For significant service to conservation and the environment, particularly whale research in Western Australia.
- Micheline-Nicole Jenner — For significant service to conservation and the environment, particularly whale research in Western Australia.
- Robert Richmond Jordan — For significant service to business and commerce, particularly through the commercial property industry, and to charitable causes.
- Lesley Janet Kealton — For significant service to community health as an advocate for support for people with a mental illness, and their carers and families.
- Andrew Stewart Kemp — For significant service to medicine, and to medical education, in the field of paediatric allergy and immunology as a clinician, academic and researcher.
- Joseph Krampel — For significant service to the Jewish community of Victoria, particularly in the area of aged care, and to sports administration.
- Ian John Kronborg — For significant service to medicine, particularly gastroenterology, and through innovative substance abuse treatment programs.
- Eric John Law — For significant service to the Indigenous community of western Queensland, and to education and housing initiatives.
- Godfrey Alan Letts — For significant service to politics and government in the Northern Territory, and to conservation and the environment.
- Teresa Raye Lewis — For significant service to the Indigenous communities of the East Pilbara, particularly to women and children affected by domestic violence.
- Chong Voon Lim — For significant service to the performing arts as a musician, composer, producer and musical director, and to the community.
- Eileen Margaret Mackley — For significant service to the visual arts, particularly through administrative, fundraising and philanthropic roles, and to heritage preservation.
- Hylton John Mackley — For significant service to the visual arts, particularly through administrative, fundraising and philanthropic roles, to heritage preservation, and to the community.
- Richard Cawley Madden — For significant service to people with a disability through a range of organisations, to policy development and social statistics, and to the community.
- David Gregory Mann — For significant service to the community of Victoria, particularly through charitable organisations, to business, and to the promotions and marketing sector.
- Helen Maree Manser — For significant service to the community of Tasmania, particularly through the establishment and management of regional development initiatives.
- Daryl William Manzie — For significant service to the people and Parliament of the Northern Territory, and to the community through leadership in advisory roles.
- Andrew James Marshall — For significant service to the building and construction industry through professional organisations, to academia, and to the Anglican Church of Australia.
- Michael Philip McBride — For significant service to primary industry in South Australia, particularly through the administration of pastoral and wool organisations.
- Christine Faye McDonald — For significant service to respiratory and sleep medicine as a clinician-researcher, administrator, and mentor, and to professional medical organisations.
- Anne McGill — For significant service to the community through charitable organisations at a regional, national and international level.
- Andrew John McLachlan — For significant service to pharmacy as a researcher, educator and administrator, and to professional medical and scientific organisations.
- Geoffrey Roger McNamara — For significant service to secondary education, particularly in the disciplines of science and astronomy.
- Jeannette Milgrom — For significant service to psychology as a researcher, advisor and administrator, to education, and to professional organisations.
- Brian James Morris — For significant service to health education and research, particularly through the study of molecular genetics and hypertension, and to professional organisations.
- Ian George Nethercote — For significant service to electricity supply in Victoria through industry reform and restructuring, to education, and to the community of Gippsland.
- Gael Lauraine Newton — For significant service to the visual arts as photography curator, and as an author and researcher, particularly of Southeast Asian photography.
- James Gilbert Nicol — For significant service to the community of Warrnambool through contributions to local government, tertiary education, sport, health and social welfare.
- Cheryl Anne Norris — For significant service to nursing, particularly to neonatal paediatrics, as a clinician and administrator, to education, and to the history of nursing in Tasmania.
- Margaret Jennifer Nowak — For significant service to education in the disciplines of business studies and economics, and to community and charitable organisations.
- Terence William O'Connor — For significant service to medicine, particularly as a colorectal surgeon, and as an educator, clinician and administrator of medical organisations.
- Brian Kenneth Owler — For significant service to medicine through the leadership and administration of professional medical organisations, and to education.
- Marie Porter — For significant service to education and to the community, particularly as a researcher and advocate for the welfare of women and children.
- Wendy Marie Poussard — For significant service to the community, particularly as an advocate for the advancement of women's rights in the Asia-Pacific region.
- Leslie Lewis Reti — For significant service to medicine in the field of gynaecology and women's health as a clinician and educator, and to the community.
- Robert John Riddel — For significant service to architecture as a practitioner, to education, and to heritage preservation in Queensland.
- Iain Leslie Riggs — For significant service to oenology as a winemaker, to the development of the Australian wine industry, and to the promotion of the Hunter region.
- Damian Peter Rogers — For significant service to architecture, and to the building and construction industry, as a leader and administrator of professional organisations.
- Peter Herbert Routley — For significant service to the international community through the leadership and administration of foreign aid programs.
- Margaret Alicia Sahhar — For significant service to health education, particularly through genetic counselling, and to the community through professional health organisations.
- Peter Anthony Sallmann — For significant service to the legal profession as a leader and advisor to professional judicial organisations, and as an educator.
- Peter Robert Seamer — For significant service to urban and regional planning and design, to public administration, and to local government.
- Michael John Shanahan — For significant service to the judiciary and to the legal profession as a judge and as an advocate and mentor for juvenile and Indigenous justice issues.
- John Randall Sharp — For significant service to the people and Parliament of Australia, to the aviation industry, and to the community.
- Rosemary Anne Sinclair — For significant service to business, particularly through leadership and administrative roles in the telecommunications industry.
- Andrew Harris Singer — For significant service to emergency medicine as a clinician, educator and administrator, and to professional medical organisations.
- Jai Singh — For significant service to education, particularly in the field of physics, as an academic and researcher, and to professional scientific organisations.
- Andrew Scott Skeels — For significant service to medicine, particularly in the field of palliative care, as a clinician and educator.
- Ian Richard Smith — For significant service to the community of South Australia through not-for-profit organisations, and to Australia-United Kingdom relations.
- Jane Ward Smith — For significant service to the broadcast media industry, particularly to film and television, through administrative roles, and to the community.
- Kenneth Maurice Smith — For significant service to the people and Parliament of Victoria, to Australia-China relations, and to the community.
- Bernard Mark Smithers — For significant service to medicine in the fields of gastrointestinal and melanoma surgery, to medical education, and to professional organisations.
- David Harry Sonnabend — For significant service to medicine in the field of orthopaedics, as a clinician and administrator, and to medical education.
- Domenico (Dominic) Spagnolo — For significant service to medicine, particularly in the field of pathology, as a clinician, and to medical education as a researcher and author.
- Michael Stefanovic — For significant service to international relations in senior investigative roles with the United Nations and the World Bank.
- Bernard William Stewart — For significant service to medicine in the field of environmental carcinogenesis, as a researcher and advocate, and to professional medical organisations.
- Martin Paul Stone — For significant service to the community through support for charitable organisations, and to the automotive industry.
- Andrew John Stoner — For significant service to the people and Parliament of New South Wales, to Australia-China business relations, and to the community.
- Gillian Jane Storey — For significant service to women in regional and remote areas, to politics and public policy, and to the community of Yass.
- Elizabeth Jean Swain — For significant service to the mining industry as a metallurgist, as a role model for female engineers, and to the community of Tasmania.
- Shurlee Lesley Swain — For significant service to education, particularly through comparative social history, as an academic, author, and researcher, and to the community.
- Marie Louise Sylvan — For significant service to business, particularly to consumer rights, investment and health agencies, and to conservation.
- Peter Theodore Tanner — For significant service to the community through leadership of charitable organisations, to veterans, and to business.
- John Douglas Taylor — For significant service to medicine as a urologist and urogynaecologist, to medical education, and to the community.
- Philip Geoffrey Thompson — For significant service to medicine as a plastic and reconstructive surgeon, to health initiatives in South East Asia, and to professional organisations.
- Colin Houston Thomson — For significant service to medical research, particularly to research ethics, to education, and to professional organisations.
- Rebecca Giggi Tolstoy — For significant service to the community through leadership of social welfare organisations, and through support for victims of domestic violence.
- Leo Edward Tutt — For significant service to community health, particularly to people with diabetes, through administrative and leadership roles, and to accounting.
- Brandon John Wainwright — For significant service to medicine in the field of molecular bioscience, to cell biology and genome research, and to education.
- Claire Elizabeth Wainwright — For significant service to medicine as a respiratory clinician, and for leadership into the study of cystic fibrosis.
- Reece Allan Waldock — For significant service to public administration, particularly to transport and infrastructure planning and development in Western Australia, and to the community.
- David Robert Walker — For significant service to education as an academic in the field of Australian studies, and to international relations.
- David Allan Kilpatrick Watters — For significant service to medicine and medical education in endocrine and colorectal surgery, and through leadership roles with professional organisations.
- Juliana Waugh — For significant service to the community through advocacy roles to improve the safety and education for people who interact and work with horses.
- Agnes Marquez Whiten — For significant service to the multicultural community of Queensland through a range of organisations, and to the promotion of gender diversity.
- Carmel Anne Williams — For significant service to people with a disability, particularly through sporting organisations, and as an athlete and paralympian.
- Geoffrey Arthur Williams — For significant service to conservation and the environment as an ecologist, biologist, author and wildlife refuge custodian.
- Josephine Anne Willis — For significant service to the judiciary, and to the law, to Indigenous access to justice initiatives, and to cultural diversity.
- John William Wilson — For significant service to medicine, and to medical research, in the field of respiratory disease, and to professional organisations.
- Janet Rae Wood — For significant service to aged welfare as an advocate for human rights and health initiatives, and to the Uniting Church in Australia.
- Charles Herbert Woodward — For significant service to the tourism industry in North Queensland through roles as an advisor and tour operator, to sport, and to the community.
- Darryl Charles Wright — For significant service to the Indigenous community of New South Wales, particularly in the areas of health and welfare, and to sport.
- Christian John Zahra — For significant service to rural and regional development, to the advancement of Indigenous welfare, and to the Parliament of Australia.
- Susan Zichy-Woinarski — For significant service to the community of Tasmania through a range of conservation and animal welfare organisations, and to women.

==== Military Division ====
Navy

- Rear Admiral Peter Michael Quinn, CSC, RAN – For exceptional service to the Royal Australian Navy and Defence in senior management.

Army

- Major B – For exceptional service to the Australian Army in the field of specialist military engineering between 2003 and 2017.
- Colonel Jeffrey Robert Brock – For exceptional service to the Australian Army in the fields of Aviation Medicine and Health.
- Colonel Gabrielle Maree Follett – For exceptional service to the Australian Defence Force as Commanding Officer 3rd Combat Service Support Battalion and as a Staff Officer in the Office of the Chief of the Defence Force and Army Headquarters.
- Colonel Damian John Hill – For exceptional service as Commander Combat Training Centre, Commanding Officer of 4th Regiment, Royal Australian Artillery and as acting Commander 3rd Brigade.
- Brigadier Christopher John Mills – For exceptional service as Chief of Future Operations Headquarters Regional Command South in Afghanistan, Director Exercise Planning at Headquarters Joint Operations Command, Director General Modernisation Army and for contributions to the development of Australian Defence Force capabilities.
- Colonel Nicole Louise Sadler, CSC – For exceptional performance of duty in the field of mental health leadership, strategy and reform for the Australian Defence Force.
- Warrant Officer Donald Garry Spinks, OAM – For exceptional service to soldiering within the Australian Defence Force in senior Regimental Sergeant Major appointments, culminating in the appointment of Regimental Sergeant Major of the Army.
- Brigadier Neil Thomas Sweeney – For exceptional service as the Deputy Commander of Joint Task Force 633 National Command Headquarters for all Australian Forces in the Middle East, while deployed on Operation ACCORDION from July 2016 to April 2017.
- Brigadier Leigh Suzanne Wilton – For exceptional service as Deputy and Chief of Staff of Army Headquarters, and Director General Personnel – Army and for contributions to Army's personnel capability.

Air Force

- Squadron Leader Paul James Simmons, CSM – For exceptional service to the Australian Defence Force in air combat capability development.

==== Honorary Division ====
- Peter Terence Kempen – For significant service to the community through executive roles with a range of health organisations, to education, and to the accountancy profession.

=== Medal of the Order of Australia (OAM) ===
==== General Division ====
- Arman Abrahimzadeh — For service to the community through social welfare organisations.
- Rex Adams — For service to local government, and to the community of Walkerville.
- Kenneth Henry Addison — For service to the community through the Anglican Church of Australia.
- Terence Francis Ahern — For service to medicine, particularly in the field of general practice.
- Margaret Lorraine Albury — For service to the community of Cessnock.
- Gillian Mary Aldridge — For service to the community of Salisbury, and to local government.
- Christopher John Allum — For service to surf lifesaving.
- Kenneth Ralph Ames — For service to the preservation of rail transport history, and to youth.
- Jack Anastas — For service to the welfare of veterans, and to the community.
- Peter Milton Andrews — For service to the Uniting Church in Australia through a range of voluntary roles.
- Judith Robyn Anictomatis — For service to women in the Northern Territory.
- Peter Chester Arnold — For service to medicine through a range of roles with professional organisations, and as a general practitioner.
- John Richard Asquith — For service to conservation and the environment.
- Esther Austin — For service to the visual arts.
- Gary Marshall Ayton — For service to emergency medicine.
- Robert James Bache — For service to Australian rules football, and to cricket.
- Anthony Charles Bailey — For service to the Anglican Church of Australia, and to the community.
- Carolyn Jean Baird — For service to the community through hospital support.
- Emoke Veronica Bakacs — For service to the community through charitable support.
- Donna Louise Baker — For service to sport in a range of roles.
- Johnny Baker — For service to the Jewish community.
- Kathleen Lynette Banks — For service to war widows, and to the community.
- Michael Gordon Barkl — For service to the performing arts and music education.
- Kate Rose Barnett — For service to aged welfare.
- Geoffrey Thomas Barton — For service to rugby union.
- Neville John Barwick — For service to the community, and to Australia-Timor Leste relations.
- Valma Joan Bazley — For service to golf.
- Keith Francis Beck — For service to medicine through a range of roles.
- Pam Margaret Beckhouse — For service to people with a disability.
- Anthony Francis Bell — For service to charitable organisations, and to sailing.
- John Leslie Bellerby — For service to the community of Woodgate.
- Gordon Edward Bennett — For service to the television broadcast industry, and to the community.
- Olive Patricia Bice — For service to the performing arts, particularly through country music.
- William Raymond Biddle — For service to the community through a range of roles.
- Lynette Teresa Bishop — For service to education in Queensland.
- Donald Greer Blair — For service to the community, and to pipe bands.
- James Arthur Blakeney — For service to horse sports.
- Gregory Wilson Blaze — For service to civil engineering.
- Philip Ernest Bock — For service to geology, marine biology, and to the community.
- Rony Bognar — For service to women, and to the Jewish community.
- Terry Dorcen Bolin — For service to medicine in the field of gastroenterology.
- Frances Mary Bonnici — For service to the Maltese community, and to education.
- Ian Boswell — For service to athletics.
- Sheena Margaret Boughen — For service to the performing arts through administrative and executive roles.
- Deborah Anne Bowden — For service to the Crown through administration of the Australian honours system.
- Michael Rodney Boyce — For service to vocational training.
- William Gwynn Boyd — For service to veterans and their families.
- Arthur Stafford Bradley — For service to the print media, and to the community of Temora.
- Robyn Margaret Bradley — For service to music through community ensembles.
- John Herbert Brady — For service to the community of Warwick.
- Philip Stuart Brady — For service to the broadcast media industry.
- Creagh Macdonald Bramley — For service to veterans and their families.
- Lois Bramley — For service to veterans and their families.
- Alan Edward Bray — For service to medicine, particularly to vascular surgery.
- Maurice Leonard Breen — For service to rugby league, and to industrial relations.
- Wayne Robert Brennan — For service to rugby league, and to touch football.
- Margaret Anne Brickhill — For service to the performing arts, and to the community of Wangaratta.
- Kenneth John Bridges — For service to veterans and their families.
- John David Bridle — For service to the community through a range of organisations.
- Edward Harris Brill — For service to the community of Ebenezer.
- Susan Jane Brill — For service to the community of Ebenezer.
- Joanne Broadbent — For service to cricket.
- John Edward Brookes — For service to veterans and their families.
- Beverley Dawn Brown — For service to animal welfare.
- Lorraine Brown — For service to softball.
- Robert Darwin Brown — For service to the performing arts, particularly through music.
- Walter Wesley Brown — For service to music through brass bands, and to the community.
- Peter John Browne — For service to education in Western Australia.
- Kelvin George Bryant — For service to boxing.
- Mary Rose Bryant — For service to veterans and their families.
- Michael Graham Buck — For service to the community through a range of charitable organisations.
- Helen Elizabeth Buckingham — For service to the community of Victoria.
- Kim Rosemary Buhagiar — For service to the community.
- Lynette Dawn Burden — For service to the Uniting Church in Australia.
- Cecil Raymond Burgess — For service to local government, and to the community of Gundaroo.
- Gregory John Burke — For service to community celebrations.
- Ralph Davidson Butcher — For service to the community through a range of organisations.
- Martin Samuel Butler — For service to the performing arts, particularly through music.
- Patrick Thomas Cahir — For service to the community through a range of organisations.
- James Leo Cameron — For service to veterans and their families.
- Ian Alexander Campbell — For service to medicine as a surgeon.
- James Anthony Castley — For service to the community through a range of roles.
- Constantine George Castrisos — For service to the restaurant and catering industry.
- Terri Anne Cater — For service to athletics.
- Kevin John Chambers — For service to medicine, and to the community of Mildura.
- Winifred Elizabeth Chittick — For service to the community of Kiama.
- Pamela Rose Christensen — For service to the community of Caulfield.
- Noeline Glenda Clamp — For service to the multicultural community of Logan.
- William Clark — For service to music education.
- Jennifer Clare Clarke — For service to the community of Narrandera, and to local government.
- Douglas James Close — For service to the community of Outtrim.
- Brendon John Collins — For service to the building and construction industry.
- Freda May Collison — For service to the community of Gresford.
- Rosario Colosimo — For service to the community through charitable organisations.
- Catherine Louise Conway — For service to gliding.
- Patricia Bette Cook — For service to the community of Clunes.
- Rexton Linus Cook — For service to the community of Wollongong, and to education.
- Marion Jean Cooper — For service to the community through charitable organisations, and to sailing.
- Michael James Cooper — For service to medicine in the field of gynaecology.
- Dene Desmond Cordes, PSM — For service to conservation and the environment.
- Richard Ian Cordy — For service to rugby union.
- Fran Corner — For service to the community of Port Stephens.
- Peter Stewart Cowie — For service to the chiropractic profession.
- John Sydney Coxon — For service to tenpin bowling.
- John Gerard Craven — For service to cycling.
- Robert Kinleside Crawford — For service to the performing and visual arts, and as an author.
- Helene Lorraine Cronin — For service to community history.
- John Bruce Cuneo — For service to sailing.
- Norman Peter Curtis — For service to conservation and the environment.
- James Martin Cuskelly — For service to music education.
- Ursula Mary Dahl — For service to the community through social welfare organisations.
- Iyla Therese Davies — For service to education.
- Catherine Mary Day — For service to education.
- Anthony Joseph (Tony) De Domenico — For service to urban planning, research and development in Victoria.
- Pastor Perez De Lasala — For service to pipe organ restoration.
- Jaimie De Salis — For service to community health.
- Janeth Mumtaz Deen — For service to the multicultural community of Queensland.
- Colin James Dennison — For service to the preservation of local history.
- Patricia Margaret Desmarchelier — For service to science in the field of microbiology and food safety.
- Yvonne June Dichiera — For service to the multicultural community of Ballarat.
- William Gordon Dobbin — For service to the community as a hospital chaplain.
- Phyllis Olivia Dorey — For service to the Jewish community.
- Steven John Doszpot — For service to the community of the Australian Capital Territory.
- Patrick John Durnford — For service to veterans, and to military history preservation.
- John Gerard Ebert — For service to community health.
- Dianne Mary Eden — For service to performing arts education.
- Margaret Louise Edwards — For service to the community of Roma.
- Olive Margaret Elston — For service to youth, and to the community.
- Philip Ernest Emmanuel — For service to the performing arts, particularly through music.
- Yvonne Engelman — For service to the Jewish community.
- Dianne Cathryn Evans — For service to the community of Yarrawonga/Mulwala.
- Keith Andrew Fagg — For service to the community of Geelong.
- Mervyn Keith Fairbank — For service to the community through a range of roles.
- Brendan Farrell — For service to primary industry.
- Jeanette Ann Farrell — For service to the community.
- Julienne Florence Feast — For service to the community of Mount Gambier.
- Bernard Philip Fehon — For service to the community through social welfare programs.
- Victor George Feros — For service to town planning.
- Geoffrey William (Ephraim) Finch — For service to the Jewish community.
- Bruce Fink — For service to the community through charitable organisations.
- Kenneth Wayne Fitzsimmons — For service to information technology.
- Margaret Ann Ford — For service to education, and to the community.
- Lynette May Foreman — For service to athletics.
- Paul Philip Fownes — For service to surf life saving.
- Elizabeth Mary Fraser — For service to the community.
- Jennifer Mary Fraser — For service to youth through public speaking organisations.
- Kenneth George Freeman — For service to the community of Blacktown.
- Marjory Noelene Freeman — For service to the community of Blacktown.
- Denise Mary Fridolf — For service to veterans and their families.
- Raymond Alfred Fry — For service to the community of Cairns.
- Frederic Shane Fryer — For service to dentistry.
- Richard John Fuller — For service to conservation and the environment.
- Elizabeth Anne Furner — For service to the community through a range of organisations.
- Elaine Iris Gamer — For service to community health.
- Richard Herbert Gastineau-Hills — For service to chess.
- Edward Anthony Gauden — For service to the community through social welfare programs.
- Barry Gaukroger — For service to the community of Inverell.
- Frank Bruno Gazzola — For service to bocce.
- Lesley Colleen Gent — For service to veterans and their families.
- Andrea Elizabeth Gerrard — For service to veterans and their families
- Deanne Margaret Gibbon — For service to women in the Australian Defence Force.
- Iris Lorraine Gillingham — For service to the community of Sandgate.
- Sara (Shirley) Glance — For service to the community.
- Marion Judith Gledhill — For service to the Uniting Church in Australia, and to social welfare.
- Barry Glover — For service to veterans and their families.
- Donald Macarthur Godden — For service to the community through history preservation organisations.
- John Godfrey — For service to veterans and their families.
- Alan Goldstone — For service to Jewish education, and to the law.
- Michael Paul Goodwin — For service to military history preservation.
- Edna Margaret Gorton — For service to the community of Tweed Heads.
- John Goss — For service to motor sports.
- Dorothy Madge Graff — For service to the Jewish community.
- Simon John Grant — For service to medicine, particularly to endocrinology.
- Antony John Gray — For service to the performing arts, particularly through music as a pianist.
- Jane Helen Greacen — For service to medicine, and to community health.
- David John Grenfell — For service to the building and construction industry.
- Jane Mary Griffith — For service to nursing.
- Vicki Anne Grima — For service to the visual arts, particularly in ceramics.
- Thomas Maxwell Grubb — For service to youth through Scouts.
- Jennifer Ann Gubbins — For service to community health.
- Geoffrey Bruce Haigh — For service to the community, and to engineering.
- William Frederick Hall — For service to industrial relations, and to the community.
- Pat Hallahan — For service to the community through history preservation organisations.
- Ross McLean Hamilton — For service to rugby league.
- Trevor Robert Hamilton — For service to the community of the Blue Mountains.
- William Ross Hamilton-Foster — For service to the community of Kempsey.
- John David Hanlon — For service to veterans and their families.
- Charles Alfred Hanna — For service to business, and the community.
- Elisabeth Anne Hannelly — For service to softball.
- Michael John Hannelly — For service to softball.
- Raelene Dorothy Hards — For service to the community.
- Margaret Mary Hardy — For service to the arts through a range of roles.
- Jennifer Gail Harragon — For service to lawn bowls.
- John James Harrison — For service to veterans and their families.
- Robert Neil Harvey, MBE — For service to cricket.
- Barbara Ellen Hawkins — For service to business and industry education.
- Margaret Lesley Haycroft — For service to the community of South Gippsland.
- Christian Michael Hayes — For service to swimming.
- Carmen Hayhoe — For service to the community through hospital support.
- Doreen Ruth Henson — For service to the community through the Baptist Church of Australia.
- Elgwen May Herdegen — For service to veterans and their families.
- Robert Andrew Hernandez — For service to the Filipino community of Queensland.
- Madelon Heuke — For service to veterans and their families.
- Clara Jean Hicks — For service to netball.
- Bruce Sands Hill — For service to Australian rules football.
- David Austin Hind — For service to engineering, to education, and to the community.
- Maria Anna Hitchcock — For service to conservation and the environment.
- John Matheson Hobday — For service to golf.
- Kathleen Hilda Hobson — For service to the community of Ballarat.
- Isobel Ottilie Hodge — For service to the community of Numurkah.
- Desmond Charles Hoffmann — For service to medicine, particularly to colorectal surgery.
- Richard Allan Hogan — For service to sport administration.
- Douglas John Holmes — For service to community health.
- Michael North Holmes — For service to the law, and to the community.
- Robin John Hood — For service to the community through marine rescue organisations.
- Jack Richard Hopgood — For service to the community of Mount Gambier.
- William Patrick Howey — For service to veterinary science.
- Graham Sydney Hudson — For service to cricket, and to the community of the Hunter.
- Robert William Hussey — For service to athletics.
- Merril Anne Jackson — For service to community history.
- Raymond Francis James — For service to veterans and their families.
- William Drayton Jamieson — For service to Australia-Thailand relations, and to the community.
- Helen Margaret Jennings — For service to music, particularly through community radio.
- Kanti Lal Jinna — For service to the multicultural community of the Australian Capital Territory.
- Diane Patrice John — For service to education through administrative roles.
- Dell Maree Johnson — For service to the community of Taroom.
- Lance Bartley Johnson — For service to public administration in the Northern Territory.
- Bruce Gilbert Johnston — For service to the community, and to dentistry.
- Ronald Eric Johnstone — For service to the museums and galleries sector, and to ornithology.
- Jeffery Jones — For service to the community of Kalgoorlie-Boulder.
- Michael Eric Jones — For service to education.
- Thomas Nigel Jones — For service to medicine, particularly as a general practitioner.
- Shirley Jones-Griffin — For service to the performing arts, particularly to ballet.
- Mary–Jane Joscelyne — For service to the community through the not-for-profit sector.
- Vincent Joseph Kane — For service to the community through social welfare organisations.
- Peter Kazacos — For service to the community through charitable organisations.
- Margaret Kathleen Keech — For service to the community of Bendigo.
- Noel Raymond Kelly — For service to rugby league.
- Sharon Anne Kelly — For service to netball.
- John Samuel Kemfert — For service to local government, and to the community of the Yarriambiack shire.
- Keith Allen Kennedy — For service to surf lifesaving.
- Frederick Kenyon — For service to the television broadcast industry.
- Catherine Anne Kerr — For service to softball.
- Gregory M Kerr — For service to youth through a range of roles.
- Vicki Joanne Kerr — For service to netball, and to the community.
- Torsten Henry Ketelsen — For service to Australia-Germany relations, to business, and to the community.
- Robert William Kilby — For service to youth with a disability through education initiatives.
- Brendan Robert Kincade — For service to veterans and their families.
- Stephen Bryce Kinnear — For service to medicine, particularly to anaesthesiology.
- Gregory Wayne Kipling — For service to the community through charitable initiatives.
- Esther Naomi Kirby — For service to the Indigenous community of Victoria.
- Mark Alexander Kirkland — For service to medical research.
- Robert Scott Knight — For service to the library and information sciences sector, particularly in the Riverina.
- Lynne Koerbin — For service to people with a disability, and to community health.
- Lorraine Joy Koller — For service to the pharmacy profession.
- Robert Clegg Kretchmann — For service to the community of Toowoomba.
- Maxim Jack Krilich — For service to rugby league.
- Dianne Kuchar — For service to the Jewish community.
- Merilyn Dora Kuchel — For service to horticulture and botanical organisations in South Australia.
- Natalie Anne Kyriacou — For service to wildlife and environmental conservation education.
- Panayiotis Hadji Kyriacou — For service to the Cypriot community of Darwin.
- Untung Lalsito — For service to the community of Forbes.
- Gayangwa Dimingkyangwa Lalara — For service to the Indigenous community of the Northern Territory.
- Anthony Charles Langer — For service to the international community through landmine clearance and charitable organisations.
- Geoffrey Alan Larkham — For service to rugby union.
- Desmond Keith Latham — For service to community of Armidale.
- Marina Gaye Laverty — For service to hockey.
- Ian Douglas Lawrey — For service to veterans and their families.
- Herbert Frederick Leake — For service to the community of the Central Coast.
- Jonathan Michael Leighton — For service to cycling.
- Scott Victor Levi — For service to the broadcast media industry, and to the community.
- Pauline Isabel Ley — For service to people affected by adoption and reproductive technology.
- Helen June L'Huillier — For service to cross country skiing, and to the community.
- Nadia Lindrop — For service to the Indigenous community of the Northern Territory
- James Litchfield — For service to primary industry, particularly to merino sheep and beef cattle breeding.
- Dorothy Lockwood — For service to netball.
- Joan Beatrice Loudon — For service to education.
- William Joseph Lovering — For service to the community.
- Charlie John Lynn — For service to the people and Parliament of New South Wales.
- Suzanne Margaret Macleod — For service to the Scottish community of Victoria.
- Margaret Elizabeth Macmillan — For service to people with Alzheimer's and their carers.
- Alan Brian Makin — For service to athletics, and to people with a disability.
- Bill Malandris — For service to the Greek community of North Queensland.
- Hazel Isabel Maltby — For service to the community of Bowen.
- Stephen Andrew Margolis — For service to rural medicine, and to medical education.
- Trevor Douglas Martyn — For service to the road transport industry, and to the community.
- Andrea Jane Mason — For service to the Indigenous community of the Northern Territory.
- Elizabeth Joy Massey — For service to the Indigenous community of the Northern Territory.
- Eva M G Matiszik — For service to the community of Bathurst.
- Desley Mary Matthews — For service to the community of Caboolture.
- Harold Richard Matthews — For service to veterans.
- Jocelyn Maughan — For service to the visual arts, and to education.
- Michael John Mavromatis — For service to the community of Port Pirie.
- Anthony James McAleer — For service to the community, and to military history.
- Lyall Robert McCarthy — For service to rowing.
- Sandra Kay McCarthy — For service to local government, and to the community of Kiama.
- Robyn Grace McFarlane — For service to women, and to the community of the Pioneer Valley.
- Kevin John McGlinn — For service to the community through Freemasonry.
- Barry John McGowan — For service to community history.
- Ian Trevor McIvor — For service to military history preservation, and to the community.
- Shirley Naina McIvor — For service to military history preservation, and to the community.
- Heather Margaret McKee — For service to social welfare organisations.
- Lynette Valma McKenzie — For service to swimming.
- Paul Richard McKenzie — For service to medicine, particularly to anatomical pathology.
- Karen Anne McKeown — For service to local government, to the community of Penrith, and to women.
- Angus Ormond McKinnon — For service to veterinary science, particularly to equine reproduction.
- Marika Reet McLachlan — For service to secondary education.
- Pauline Nellie McLaughlin — For service to community health, particularly palliative care.
- Gregory Darcy McLean — For service to the building and construction industry.
- Ian James McPherson — For service to youth, and to golf.
- Meredith Anne McVey — For service to the community through support for doctors.
- Jacqueline Kim Mein — For service to medicine, and to community health.
- Ian Robert Mence — For service to the community of Brighton.
- Leslie Stephan Micale — For service to the community of Sunnybank.
- Hugh Simpson Millar — For service to medicine, particularly to otolaryngology.
- George Harry Miller — For service to the community of Yarra Glen.
- John William Miller — For service to the community of the Hawkesbury.
- Warren Graham Mills — For service to the community of North Gosford.
- Percy John Milne — For service to Australia-Thailand relations.
- Robert Charles Miniter — For service to the Indigenous community of Western Australia
- Michael Miros — For service to medicine, particularly to gastroenterology.
- Kenneth Sidney Missen — For service to the community through a range of roles.
- Jennifer Ann Mitchell — For service to the community, and to women in rural Victoria.
- Kenneth Raglan Moore — For service to the community of Shepparton.
- Christine Gale Moran — For service to the community.
- Ann Eluned Morgan — For service to medicine, particularly to infant mental health.
- John Robert Morgan — For service to education, and to youth rehabilitation.
- Edwin George Morris — For service to the community of Mangrove Mountain.
- Donald Ivan Moss — For service to medicine, particularly to urology.
- Carol Lilly Muir — For service to social welfare through advocacy roles.
- Blanche Lynette Mulligan — For service to the community through a range of organisations.
- Peter David Munn — For service to education in South Australia.
- John Roderick Munro — For service to veterans and their families.
- Archibald Simon Murray — For service to secondary education, and to professional associations.
- Cheryl Lynne Myers — For service to veterans and their families.
- Victoria Sophie Nadel — For service to the community, particularly to women.
- Carmel Rita Nash — For service to education in Queensland.
- Johannes Anne Nell — For service to local government, and to the community of Port Stephens.
- John Leslie Nelson — For service to the community of Mosman.
- Valerie May Nesbitt — For service to badminton.
- John Alfred Neumann — For service to the community of the Gold Coast.
- Terence Dale Newman — For service to youth, and to the law.
- Jacqueline Ann Newton — For service to the community through charitable foundations.
- Joyce Ann Newton — For service to the community of Maleny.
- Patricia Anne Newton — For service to surf lifesaving.
- Henry Kei Shing Ngai — For service to business, and to the community.
- Dean Nicolle — For service to the conservation of Australian eucalypts.
- Margaret Ellen Ning — For service to conservation and the environment.
- Alison Lempriere Nisselle — For service to the film and television industry.
- Trevor Humphrey Noonan — For service to the community of Cobram.
- Robin Carl Norling — For service to the visual arts, and to education.
- Edna Fortunata Nowland — For service to people with mental health issues through support roles.
- Barry Raymond Oaten — For service to veterans and their families, and to the community.
- Michael John Oates — For service to psychiatric nursing.
- John Joseph O'Brien — For service to the community through social welfare organisations.
- Kim Alexander Ostinga — For service to medicine, particularly to orthopaedics.
- Thomas Peter O'Toole — For service to the retail baked goods industry, and to the community of Beechworth.
- Francis John Owen — For service to the military maritime sector, particularly to submarines.
- Melita (Milly) Maree Parker — For service to people with a disability through advocacy roles.
- Stephen Arthur Parle — For service to rugby league.
- Kiim Marie Parnell — For service to the community of the Northern Territory.
- Sideris Pashalidis — For service to the Greek community of Batemans Bay.
- Colin Alfred Paulson — For service to youth through Scouts, and to the community.
- Vivien Elsie Paulson — For service to youth through Scouts, and to the community.
- Gregory John Peake — For service to veterans and their families.
- Georgina Gay Pearce — For service to the community of Western Australia.
- Audrey Jean Pearson — For service to botanical organisations in Western Australia.
- Meegodage Senake Perera — For service to the Sri Lankan community of Victoria.
- Thomas Edward Perrigo — For service to heritage conservation, and to the community.
- Allan Edward Petersen — For service to the community of Southbrook.
- Gregory Trevor Peterson — For service to athletics.
- Geoffrey Neil Phillips — For service to rogaining, to minerals exploration, and to education.
- Michael Russell Phillips — For service to secondary education in Victoria.
- Roderic John Phillips — For service to rogaining, and to paediatric dermatology.
- Judith Ann Pinkerton-Treloar — For service to women veterans.
- Michael Alexander Pointer — For service to the beef livestock industry through a range of roles.
- John Carl Pollaers — For service to the manufacturing sector, to education, and to business.
- Graeme Alfred Pollock — For service to medical research, particularly to corneal transplantation.
- John Edward Powell — For service to the community through a range of roles.
- Patricia Emmanuel Powell — For service to the Catholic Church in Australia, and to the community.
- Trevor Raymond Powell — For service to the Scottish community of South Australia.
- Michael Robert Price — For service to people with a disability, and to the community.
- Steven William Price — For service to the broadcast media, and to the community of Townsville.
- Noel Kevin Prior — For service to horticulture.
- Barbara Nicolette Quekett — For service to education.
- Roy Donald Radunz — For service to country horse racing, and to the community of Wondai.
- Jeremy Raftos — For service to medicine, particularly to paediatrics.
- Robert Neil Ramsay — For service to veterans and their families.
- Margaret Anne Ranse — For service to the Anglican Church of Australia, and to the community.
- Ian Herbert Ravenscroft — For service to cricket.
- Stephen Anthony Reeves — For service to rugby league, and to the community.
- David John Reiken — For service to youth through Scouts.
- William Fletcher Renshaw — For service to the community through a range of organisations.
- Dennis Milvorton Richards — For service to the chiropractic profession.
- Lorraine Sylvia Roberts — For service to veterans and their families
- Christopher John Rodd — For service to the insurance industry.
- John Graham Rosenthal — For service to medicine, and to the community of Western Australia.
- Moshe Rafael Rosenzveig — For service to the visual arts, particularly to photography.
- Deirdre Joan Russell — For service to the community, particularly through music.
- Alison Lee Russell-French — For service to conservation and the environment.
- Kevin Francis Ryan — For service to local government, and to the community of Tatura.
- Sudarshan Kumar Sachdev — For service to the community, and to medicine, particularly to ophthalmology.
- Peter George Schick — For service to local government, and to the community of Randwick.
- Roslyn Shirley Scotney — For service to local government, and to the communities of Toowoomba and Pittsworth.
- Leone Scrivener — For service to seniors' education, and to the community.
- Avis June Scullin — For service to basketball.
- Romola Marie Sebastianpillai — For service to the community of Darwin through charitable and other organisations.
- Rita Katharina Seethaler — For service to steelband music, and to the community.
- Anthony Edward Sell — For service to pipe bands.
- Elsie Belphina Seriat — For service to the Indigenous community of Thursday Island.
- Marcia Jeanne Seymour-Dane — For service to women through a range of organisations.
- Robert George Sharples — For service to community health as a psychologist.
- John Moore Sharwood — For service to the community through a range of roles.
- Francis Patrick Sheehan — For service to the community of Ballarat.
- Barry Matthew Shine — For service to the print media.
- Kenneth Shingleton — For service to the conservation of birdlife.
- Arvind Kumar Shrivastava — For service to the Indian community of Melbourne.
- Neville John Sillitoe — For service to athletics.
- Wilma Joyce Simmons — For service to the community through a range of roles.
- Glenn Ives Simpson — For service to the building and construction sector, particularly to housing.
- Barton John Sinclair — For service to horse racing.
- James Devron Siviour — For service to the community of Lock.
- Robert John Skilton — For service to Australian rules football.
- Julie Anne Sloan — For service to business, particularly to workforce planning and management.
- Michelle Jasia Sloane — For service to the community through a range of organisations.
- David Lawrence Smith — For service to the people and Parliament of Western Australia, to local government, and to the community of Bunbury.
- Felicity Jane Smith — For service to community health, and to a range of organisations.
- Peter John Smith — For service to the community of the North Shore.
- Robert Murray Smith — For service to scientific research and development, and to the manufacturing sector.
- Michael Joel Solomon — For service to the community through a range of organisations.
- John Patrick Spence — For service to the community of Geelong.
- Jayanthi Srinivas — For service to the Indian community of the Northern Territory.
- Frank Edward Stamford — For service to rail transport history.
- Betty Emelie Stevens — For service to youth, and to the community.
- Stephen Colin Stock — For service to the community of Moonta.
- John Stuart — For service to the community through a range of organisations.
- Helen Louise Summers — For service to interfaith relations, and to education.
- Allan John Suter — For service to local government, and to the community of Ceduna.
- Mary Felicity Sutherland — For service to medicine, and to the community.
- Freda Ruth Sutton — For service to veterans and their families.
- Thomas John Sweeney — For service to the performing arts, and to the community of Willoughby.
- David Keith Sweeting — For service to electrical engineering.
- David Gerald Sykes — For service to dentistry, particularly to prosthodontics.
- Rosemary Aileen Syme — For service to the community through a range of organisations.
- Jan Adam Szuba — For service to the Polish community of Melbourne.
- Rhonda Talbot — For service to the community through social welfare organisations.
- Jeffrey Kang-Hee Tan — For service to the community through charitable organisations.
- Lee Reginald Tarlamis — For service to the people and Parliament of Victoria.
- Ross Gregory Tarlington — For service to secondary education.
- Catherine Denise Tate — For service to the community of Newcastle.
- Garry Clifford Taylor — For service to secondary education, and to the community.
- Allan Alfred Thomas — For service to veterans, and to the community.
- Lynette Anne Thompson — For service to the community, particularly through hospital auxiliaries.
- Neil Barrymore Thompson — For service to the community through social welfare organisations.
- Phillip Bruce Thompson — For service to the welfare of veterans.
- Peter Clive Thomson — For service to the community through a range of volunteer roles.
- Vivienne Carol Tippett — For service to medical education.
- Janet Sorby Tiver — For service to the community of Burra.
- Carlo Travaglini — For service to the Italian community of Melbourne.
- Brian John Triglone — For service to choral music in the Australian Capital Territory.
- Wei Ping Tu — For service to volleyball, and to athletes with a disability.
- Derek Paul Tuffield — For service to the community of the Darling Downs.
- Mark Rhodes Turkington — For service to education.
- Julienne Tyers — For service to nursing, and to international eye-health programs.
- Richard William Usher – For service to the welfare of veterans.
- Jocelyn Mary Van Heyst – For service to community health, particularly to speech pathology.
- Aleksandar Vasiljevic – For service to the arts, and to the community.
- Leigh Teresa Vaughan – For service to the arts and music education, to local government, and to the community.
- Renato Vecchies – For service to the Italian community of Victoria, and to medicine.
- Rosemary Vecchies – For service to the community through a range of organisations.
- Deepak Vinayak – For service to the multicultural community of Victoria.
- Denise Aline Wadley – For service to the arts and education administration in Queensland.
- John Owen Wakefield – For service to people with a disability.
- Anthony John Walch – For service to the community of Tasmania.
- Ronda Beckley Walker – For service to the community, and to women.
- Graham Bryce Wallace – For service to people with a disability, and to the community.
- Rodney Steven Wangman – For service to local government, and to the community of Albury Wodonga.
- Robert Wilson Wannan – For service to the visual and performing arts, to youth, and to the community.
- Hugh Wynter Warden – For service to primary industry, particularly to livestock management, and to the community.
- Bruce Albert Warren – For service to medicine, and to medical education, particularly to pathology.
- Geoffrey Walter Waters – For service to surf lifesaving.
- Garry Hannon Webb – For service to the community of the North Shore.
- Neil Harvey Weekes – For service to veterans and their families.
- Sydney Thomas Weller – For service to rugby league, and to the community.
- Anthony Wells – For service to cricket.
- Norman Tattershall Wells – For service to veterans and their families, and to military history.
- Ian Starr Wheatley – For service to pharmaceutical science.
- Alfred John Wheeler – For service to landscape architecture and urban planning.
- Angela Wheelton – For service to the community through a range of organisations.
- Michael Alan Whitehouse – For service to the community through a range of organisations.
- Kathleen Anne Wiggan – For service to the communities of Goulburn and Bungonia.
- Graeme John Wilkie – For service to the visual arts, particularly to sculpture.
- Peter Mackay Wilkinson – For service to the community, and to road safety education.
- Raymond Cyril Williams – For service to veterans and their families.
- Anne Shirley Wills – For service to the broadcast media in South Australia.
- Barry Thomas Wilson – For service to people with a disability.
- Richard Frank Wilson – For service to the community through a range of roles, and to medicine.
- Robert (Benny) James Wilson – For service to recreational cycling planning and standards.
- Peter Windholz – For service to the Jewish community of Victoria.
- Andrew Stephen Winters – For service to surf lifesaving.
- Peter Dudley Wood – For service to the community of Batemans Bay, and to youth.
- Robert Goodwin Wood – For service to the community, particularly through emergency response organisations.
- Barry Wright – For service to the restaurant and catering industry.
- Margaret Suzanne Wroe – For service to the community of Maryborough.
- Leonard Judah Yaffe – For service to the Jewish community of Melbourne.
- Mark Anthony Young – For service to social welfare organisations, and to youth-at-risk.
- Merrilyn Lexie Young – For service to the community of Deloraine.
- Margaret Rosemary Zacharin – For service to medicine, particularly to paediatric endocrinology.

==== Military Division ====
Navy

- Warrant Officer Scott James Shipton – For meritorious service to training and personnel management within the Royal Australian Navy.
- Warrant Officer Brett Andrew South – For meritorious service to the Royal Australian Navy in the field of submarine marine engineering.
- Commander Glenn Alan Williams, RAN – For meritorious service in the field of Navy Communications and Information Systems.

Army

- Warrant Officer Class One Kelvin James Baulch – For meritorious service in the field of Engineering Services and Construction Management within the Australian Army and wider Australian Defence Force.
- Warrant Officer Class One Matthew Francis Bold – For meritorious service as the Regimental Sergeant Major of the 9th Battalion, the Royal Queensland Regiment and the 7th Battalion, the Royal Australian Regiment.
- Major Richard Paul Clark – For meritorious service as the Brigade Major of Headquarters 9th Brigade and the Assistant Operations Officer at Headquarters 2nd Division.
- Warrant Officer Class One Paul Justin Simpfendorfer – For meritorious service in the field of Forward Arming and Refueling and Aviation Special Operations and as the Leadership Package Master at the Warrant Officer and Non-Commissioned Officer Academy.
- Warrant Officer Class Two John William Smallacombe – For meritorious performance of duty in promoting positive relationships between Indigenous communities and the Pilbara Regiment and rehabilitating wounded, injured and ill soldiers within the 5th Battalion, the Royal Australian Regiment.
- Captain Matthew James Sullican, CSM – For meritorious performance of duty as the Regimental Sergeant Major of the 1st Brigade and Regimental Master Gunner of the Combined Arms Training Centre.
- Warrant Officer Class Two W – For meritorious performance of duty, application of skills and leadership as a Manager of Intelligence Operations within the Australian Defence Force.

Air Force

- Group Captain David John Houghton – For meritorious service in materiel acquisition and sustainment as the Joint Program Office Lead, Maritime Patrol and Reconnaissance Aircraft System Program Office, and as Commanding Officer of the Training Aircraft Systems Program Office in Capability Acquisition and Sustainment Group.
- Sergeant Katrina Louise Liston – For meritorious service in instruction, case officer support, and training medical supervision as a Divisional Senior Non-Commissioned Officer at the Australian Defence Force Academy.
- Squadron Leader Christopher Nicholas Plain – For meritorious service in project management as the Number 78 Wing Transition Team Manager for the Hawk 127 Lead-In Fighter Capability Assurance Project.

==== Honorary Division ====
- Lotte Bullerjahn – For service to the multicultural community of Far North Queensland.
- Valerie Brenda Polley – For service to the community of Warrandyte.
- William James Reid – For service to the sport of full-bore shooting.
- Eric William Scott – For service to the performing arts through country music.

== Meritorious Service ==
=== Public Service Medal (PSM) ===
Public Service Medal ribbon

Federal

- Peter Bruce Clark – For outstanding public service through contributions to the stability and security of the Australian and international financial sector.
- Dr Janis Louise Cocking – For outstanding public service to Defence science and technology.
- Natasha Dawes – For outstanding public service in leading and delivering Medicare initiatives.
- Jane Elizabeth Gallagher – For outstanding public service in the areas of nursing services to veterans.
- Gary Michael Johnston – For outstanding public service through improving national and international scientific program delivery in satellite positioning and geodesy.
- Mark Stephen Konza – For outstanding public service and leadership in tax administration.
- Allan James McKinnon – For outstanding public service through significantly enhancing Australia's national security.
- Sandra Maree Ragg – For outstanding public service in leadership and policy-making in the cyber security arena.
- Padma Priya Raman – For outstanding public service in leading significant cultural, technological and governance change at the Australian Human Rights Commission.
- Lisa Catherine Rauter – For outstanding public service in establishing the ground-breaking initiative innovationXchange.
- Clayton John Trevilyan – For outstanding public service through the creation of more inclusive and accessible workplaces for APS employees with a disability.

New South Wales

- Katherine Susan Alexander – For outstanding public service to family and community services in New South Wales.
- Jason Ardler – For outstanding public service to Indigenous people in New South Wales.
- Kent Robert Boyd – For outstanding public service to local government in New South Wales.
- Laura Rebecca Christie – For outstanding public service to policy development and reform initiatives in New South Wales.
- Kevin Desmond Corcoran – For outstanding public service to Justice and Corrective Services in New South Wales.
- Kenneth Geoffrey Gainger – For outstanding public service to local government in New South Wales.
- Lucy May Kinsley – For outstanding public service to community library services in New South Wales.
- Lorraine Lam – For outstanding public service to the social housing system in New South Wales.
- Tracey Lee McCosker – For outstanding public service to community health in New South Wales.
- Paul Frances Maguire – For outstanding public service to conservation and environmental education in New South Wales.
- Dr Robert Kofi Mensah – For outstanding public service to the primary industries sector in New South Wales.
- Dr Joanne Elizabeth Mitchell – For outstanding public service to population health policy in New South Wales.
- Michael Gowrie Waterhouse – For outstanding public service to education through legal counsel roles in New South Wales.
- David Thomas Woods – For outstanding public service to National Parks and to the environment of New South Wales.

Victoria

- Richard Bolt – For outstanding public service through leadership, and innovation in energy, agriculture, education, transport, economic development and carbon policy in Victoria and nationally.
- Terence Charles Garwood – For outstanding public service across multiple policy areas, and to public sector diversity and inclusion in Victoria.
- Elizabeth Margaret Goss – For outstanding public service to the correctional services sector in Victoria.
- Julia Ellen Griggith – For outstanding public service to youth justice and correctional services in Victoria.
- Denise Catherine McLaughlin – For outstanding public service to the delivery of child protection services in Victoria.
- Jodie Lee Quilliam – For outstanding public service to records management practice in Victoria.

Queensland

- Dr Graham Fraine – For outstanding public service to social science research and policy development in Queensland
- Kirsten Herring – For outstanding public service to arts policy development in Queensland.
- Julianne Mitchell – For outstanding public service to transport infrastructure in Queensland.

Western Australia

- Dr Raymond John Masini – For outstanding public service to marine ecology and environmental protection in Western Australia.
- Keith Alan Woodward – For outstanding public service to local government administration in Western Australia.

Australian Capital Territory

- Bronwen Margaret Overion-Clarke – For outstanding public service in the Australian Capital Territory, particularly in the area of public sector standards.

=== Australian Police Medal (APM) ===
Australian Police Medal ribbon

Australian Federal Police

- Detective Sergeant Jeanette Helen Boland
- Assistant Commissioner David James Stewart

New South Wales Police Force

- Detective Chief Inspector Michael John Cook
- Superintendent John Henry Gralton
- Chief Inspector Peter Morris Hansen
- Detective Chief Inspector Bernhard Edward Janssen
- Superintendent Karen Jane McCarthy
- Detective Sergeant Michael Aloysius O'Keefe
- Detective Superintendent Paul Nicholas Pisanos

Victoria Police

- Assistant Commissioner Russell Haig Barrett
- Senior Sergeant Rebecca Dianne Caskey
- Commander Sharon Maree Cowden
- Superintendent Michael John Glowaski
- Superintendent Lisa Ann McMeeken
- Assistant Commissioner Richard Andrew Nugent
- Detective Leading Senior Constable Jennifer Kay Parker

Queensland Police Service

- Detective Inspector Melissa Louise Aanderson, BM
- Superintendent Dale Jennifer Frieberg
- Senior Sergeant Renee Leigh Hanrahan
- Inspector Lee David Jeffires
- Detective Senior Sergeant Richard Brent Lacey
- Detective Superintendent Brian Laurence Swan
- Superintendent Ronald Van Saane
- Detective Superintendent Jon Harold Wacker

Western Australia Police Force

- Sergeant Kaylene Joy Adamson
- Superintendent Peter Geoffrey Hatch
- Superintendent Dene John Leekong
- Senior Sergeant Geoffery James Regan

South Australia Police

- Senior Constable First Class Mark John Carroll
- Detective Senior Sergeant John Garde
- Sergeant Taryn Trevelion

Tasmania Police

- Inspector Fiona Catherine Lieutier

Northern Territory Police Force

- Commander Michael John White

=== Australian Fire Service Medal (AFSM) ===
AFSM ribbon

New South Wales

- Geoffrey Kenneth Andrew
- David John Gill
- Martin Fennessy Harrison
- Gregory Alan Ingersole, OAM
- Shane David Kearney
- Neale Bensley Mutton
- Gregory Patrick Rankin
- Eric Herbert Shanks
- Peter Francis Shearer
- Wayne Ronald Young

Victoria

- Ronald Neil Ber
- Mark Anthony Gilmore
- Alan Francis Hodkin
- David Peter Lanyon
- Damien Phillip O'Connor
- Bridget Ruth Ryan

Queensland

- Donald Philip Baldwin
- Leslie Norman Green
- Kaye Michelle Healing
- Alan Edward Richards
- David John Woods

Western Australia

- Robert Beverley Cook
- Ian Andrew Joseph
- Francis Pratt

South Australia

- Desmond John Ford
- Robert Glenn Sandford

Australian Capital Territory

- Kevin Clarence Jeffery
- Wayne Stanley Shaw

Northern Territory

- David Gordon Lines

=== Ambulance Service Medal (ASM) ===
ASM ribbon

New South Wales

- Sharon Lee White

Queensland

- Gavin John Fullier
- Lillian (Leia) Sue Spencer
- Rebecca Jane Taylor
- John Camillo Tesoriero

South Australia

- Ian Leslie Pay
- Leonie Robyn Wilton

Australian Capital Territory

- James Gerard Arneman

=== Emergency Services Medal (ESM) ===
ESM ribbon

New South Wales

- Gordon Ryrie Hill, AFSM
- Michael Francis Kelly
- Peter John May

Victoria

- Sean Anthony Whelan

Queensland

- Terrence Arthur Chapman

South Australia

- Mark Andrew Hanson

Australian Capital Territory

- Graeme John Tonge

=== Australian Corrections Medal (ACM) ===
ACM ribbon

New South Wales

- Steven John Davis
- Barry Stephen Grice
- Mark Anthony Simmons
- Emma Smith

Victoria

- Gaylene Maree Coram
- Taryn Jane Escreet
- Sarah Miles
- Donatella (Donna) Palma
- Russell Joseph Reed

Western Australia

- Trevor Thomas Demmery
- Rhonda Lesley Mackay
- Ross Owen Stevens

Northern Territory

- Louise Monica Blacker

== Distinguished and Conspicuous Service ==
=== Distinguished Service Cross (DSC) ===
DSC ribbon

Army

- Lieutenant Colonel N – For distinguished command and leadership in warlike operations as the Commanding Officer of Special Operations Task Group 632 on Operation OKRA from November 2016 to June 2017.
- Colonel Richard Anthony Vagg – For distinguished command and leadership in warlike operations as the Commander of Task Group Taji IV in Iraq on Operation OKRA, from December 2016 to June 2017.

Air Force

- Air Vice-Marshal Timothy Charles Innes, CSC – For distinguished command and leadership in warlike operations as the Commander Joint Task Force 633 on Operations OKRA and HIGHROAD from January 2016 to January 2017.

=== Distinguished Service Medal (DSM) ===
DSM ribbon

Army

- Lieutenant Colonel Christopher Dudley Gardiner – For distinguished leadership in warlike operations as Commanding Officer Training Task Unit of Task Group Taji IV in Iraq on Operation OKRA from November 2016 to June 2017.
- Colonel Michael Lee Murdoch – For distinguished leadership in warlike operations as the Commander of the Kabul Garrison Command Advisory Team, and Senior Mentor to the Kabul Garrison Commander from October 2016 to June 2017.

Air Force

- Wing Commander G – For distinguished leadership in warlike operations as Commander Task Element 630.1.1 on Operation OKRA from January 2017 to May 2017.
- Air Vice-Marshal Michael Robert Kitcher, AM – For distinguished leadership in warlike operations whilst deployed as Commander Air Task Group 630 on Operation OKRA from January 2017 to June 2017.
- Air Vice-Marshal Stephen Leslie Meredith, AM – For distinguished leadership in warlike operations whilst deployed as Director Combined Air and Space Operations Centre, United States Air Force Central Command, from January 2017 to July 2017.

=== Commendation for Distinguished Service ===
Commendation for Distinguished Service ribbon

Army

- Major B – For distinguished performance of duties in warlike operations as the Executive Officer of Special Operations Task Group 632 Rotation VI, in Iraq on Operation OKRA from November 2016 to June 2017.
- Colonel Kahlil Scarf Fegan, DSC – For distinguished performance of duties in warlike operations as the Director of Plans in Combined Joint Force Land Component Command – Iraq, as part of Operation Inherent Resolve from July 2016 to April 2017.
- Major Christopher Daniel Gilmore – For distinguished performance of duties in warlike operations as Officer Commanding Training Team One of Task Group Taji Three in Iraq on Operation OKRA from May to December 2016.
- Major Brian E Hickey – For distinguished performance of duty in warlike operations as Officer Commanding North Baghdad Operations Command Advisory and Assistance Team, Task Group Taji IV, Iraq on Operation OKRA from November 2016 to June 2017.
- Lance Corporal J – For distinguished performance of duty in warlike operations in Iraq, on Operation OKRA from March 2017 to October 2017.
- Major M – For distinguished performance of duty in warlike operations as the Officer Commanding Special Operations Task Group 632 Rotation VI Special Forces Advisory Team and as the Deputy Commander of Task Force – Counter Terrorism Service on Operation OKRA from December 2016 to June 2017.
- Corporal M – For distinguished performance of duty in warlike operations and in action as the lead Joint Terminal Air Controller in Special Operations Task Group 632 Rotation VI on Operation OKRA in Iraq from November 2016 to June 2017.
- Brigadier Cheryl Ann Pearce, AM – For distinguished performance of duty in warlike operations as the Commander Task Group Afghanistan, Operation HIGHROAD from February 2016 to November 2016.
- Private R – For distinguished performance of duty in warlike operations in Afghanistan, on Operation HIGHROAD from September 2016 to February 2017.
- Major R – For distinguished performance of duty in warlike operations as the Officer Commanding the Special Operations Task Group 632 Rotation VI Intelligence Fusion and Support Cell, in Iraq on Operation OKRA from November 2016 to June 2017.
- Brigadier Jason Kyle Walk – For distinguished performance of duty in warlike operations while serving as the Deputy Director Sustainment, Combined Security Transition Command-Afghanistan on Operation HIGHROAD, in Kabul, Afghanistan from July 2016 to August 2017.
- Colonel Mark Christopher Welburn – For distinguished performance of duty in warlike operations as the Deputy Chief of Staff Security Force Assistance, Headquarters Train Advise Assist Command – South, Kandahar Afghanistan while deployed on Operation HIGHROAD over the period May 2016 to May 2017.

Air Force

- Flight Lieutenant G – For distinguished performance of duty in warlike operations as the Task Unit 630.2 Dynamic Targeting Intelligence Officer supporting Operation OKRA from December 2016 to June 2017.
- Group Captain H – For distinguished performance of duties in warlike operations whilst deployed as Commander Task Unit 630.2 on Operation OKRA from April 17 to August 2017.
- Squadron Leader M – For distinguished performance of duty in warlike operations while deployed as a Combat Controller with the Special Operations Joint Task Force and as the Strike Director, Combined Joint Operations Command, Iraq on Operation OKRA between February 2015 and June 2017.

=== Conspicuous Service Cross (CSC) ===
CSC ribbon

Navy

- Lieutenant Commander Amy Leigh Blacker, RANR – For outstanding achievement in the field of Navy workforce reform.
- Commodore Grant Ian Ferguson, RANR – For outstanding achievement as Director General Suakin Branch, Defence People Group.
- Captain Gregory Allen Laxton, RAN – For outstanding achievement in the field of Navy Program Management and support innovation.
- Commander Michael John Miller, RAN – For outstanding devotion to duty as the Deputy Director Operations within Maritime Border Command.
- Commander Anthony Richard Nagle, RAN – For outstanding devotion to duty as the Executive Officer in HMAS Newcastle.
- Captain Aaron Walter Nye, RAN – For outstanding achievement in the field of Major Fleet Units Sea Training.
- Chief Petty Officer Michael John O'Donnell – For outstanding devotion to duty during the execution of his duty as the Ship's Damage Control Officer when responding to an engine room fire in HMAS Maryborough on the night of 25 and 26 May 2017.

Army

- Lieutenant Colonel Charmaine Sylvia Benfield – For outstanding achievement as the Staff Officer Grade One Selections and Appointments with Career Management Army during 2016 and 2017.
- Major Katie Louise Burrup – For outstanding achievement in developing and implementing a Family and Domestic Violence Framework in North Queensland as Staff Officer Grade Two – Personnel at Headquarters 3rd Brigade.
- Colonel Steven John Hume – For outstanding achievement in the coordination of materiel support to Australian Defence Force operations.
- Lieutenant Colonel Benjamin Gerard McLennan – For outstanding achievement as the Staff Officer Grade One Soldier Combat Systems, Modernisation Branch, Army Headquarters.
- Lieutenant Colonel N 0 For outstanding achievement in military intelligence.
- Lieutenant Colonel Dennis Patrick Robins – For outstanding devotion to duty as the Senior Instructor Land Intelligence Wing, Defence Force School of Intelligence.
- Colonel Leonard Hendrik Rouwhorst – For outstanding achievement as the Joint Operations Command lead planner for the Middle East Region from January 2015 to August 2017.
- Colonel Kirsty Marie Skinner – For outstanding devotion to duty as the Staff Officer Grade One Postings, Directorate of Soldier Career Management, Army.
- Lieutenant Colonel Henry William Stimson – For outstanding achievement as the Brigade Major of the 6th Combat Support Brigade.
- Brigadier Wade Bradley Stothart, DSC, AM – For outstanding achievement in significant contributions to the reform and improvement of career management and the Army people capability as Director General Career Management – Army.
- Colonel Simeon Luke Ward – For outstanding devotion to duty during the transition of the Capability Development Group and establishment of the Force Design function within Defence.
- Lieutenant Colonel Philippa Elizabeth Weiland- For outstanding dedication to duty as Staff Officer Grade One Psychology in Headquarters Forces Command.

Air Force

- Flight Sergeant Renee Louise Cole – For outstanding achievement in the advancement of the Australian Defence Force's Space situational awareness capability at Number 1 Remote Sensor Unit.
- Squadron Leader Samuel Ian Harkiss – For outstanding devotion to duty as the Information Systems Technical and Acquisition Manager within the F-35A Joint Strike Fighter Division of Capability Acquisition and Sustainment Group.
- Squadron Leader Michael James Yeomans – For outstanding devotion to duty in managing the implementation of the F-35A Joint Strike Fighter facilities program as part of the Capability Acquisition and Sustainment Group.

=== Conspicuous Service Medal (CSM) ===
CSM ribbon

Navy

- Chief Petty Officer Benjamin Keith Bryan – For meritorious devotion to duty as the High Power Maintenance Manager in HMAS Adelaide.
- Lieutenant Scott Stanley Dowd, RAN – For meritorious achievement in the field of Navy Information Warfare.
- Chief Petty Officer David James Houston – For meritorious devotion to duty in the field of Navy Engineering Training Services.
- Lieutenant Commander Gordon Jardine, RAN – For meritorious achievement in the field of landing craft training for the Royal Australian Navy.
- Lieutenant Commander Jasmine Alison Lauer-Smith, RAN – For meritorious devotion to duty in the field of submarine operations intelligence.
- Lieutenant Commander Jorge Mathew McKee, RAN – For meritorious devotion to duty as Planning (Operations) Officer in Combined Task Force 150 on Operation MANITOU from November 2015 to April 2016.
- Warrant Officer Scott Joseph Wake – For meritorious devotion to duty in the field of Naval Aviation Maintenance.

Army

- Lieutenant Colonel Peter Andrew Allan – For meritorious achievement as the Brigade Major of 7th Brigade.
- Corporal James Edward Cunningham – For meritorious achievement as a Section Commander in the 1st Battalion, the Royal Australian Regiment.
- Corporal D – For meritorious achievement as a Troop Sergeant within the 71st Electronic Warfare Squadron, 7th Signal Regiment.
- Lieutenant Colonel Travis John Gordon – For meritorious devotion to duty as the Commander of Joint Task Group 658 in support of the national elections of Papua New Guinea during the conduct of Operation HANNAH.
- Lieutenant Colonel Clarence Vincent Hovell – For meritorious achievement in operational planning and execution in the Australian Army.
- Warrant Officer Class Two J – For meritorious devotion to duty while posted as the Manager of Geospatial Intelligence Support within Special Operations Headquarters.
- Warrant Officer Class Two L – For meritorious devotion to duty in the field of Static Line parachuting, instruction, and training development from 2016 to 2017.
- Corporal M – For meritorious achievement as a Troop Sergeant within the 71st Electronic Warfare Squadron, 7th Signal Regiment.
- Lieutenant Melissa Jane Osmand – For meritorious devotion to duty as the Personnel Advisory Committee Section Corporal within the Directorate of Soldier Career Management.
- Captain Angela Gay Rose – For meritorious achievement in establishing the Defence Force School of Signals Regional Training Wing.
- Warrant Officer Class One S – For meritorious devotion to duty as a Squadron Sergeant Major in the Special Air Service Regiment between January 2014 and December 2016.
- Major Scott Brady Samson – For meritorious achievement as the Officer Commanding of Trainee Rehabilitation Wing at the School of Military Engineering.
- Warrant Officer Class One Jason Edward Sten – For meritorious devotion to duty as the Regimental Sergeant Major of the Australian Contingent and Force Headquarters Training Warrant Officer whilst deployed to the United Nations Mission in South Sudan on Operation ASLAN from November 2016 to August 2017.
- Warrant Officer Class Two Lucas Brian Telley – For meritorious devotion to duty as the acting Regimental Sergeant Major of the 1st Combat Service Support Battalion.

Air Force

- Flight Lieutenant Joshua Dominic Brown – For meritorious achievement in the introduction of the P-8A Poseidon maritime patrol and response aircraft capability.
- Squadron Leader Alesha Lee Cantelo – For meritorious devotion to duty as the Task Unit 630.1 Operations and Aviation Safety Officer on Operation OKRA from November 2016 to June 2017.
- Group Captain Nathan Mark Christie – For meritorious achievement as the Chief of Staff, Headquarters Combined Joint Task Force 633, while deployed on Operation ACCORDION during the period September 2016 to July 2017.
- Wing Commander Peter John Hay – For meritorious achievement in the project management of the P-8A Poseidon maritime patrol aircraft and support systems capability acquisition.
- Wing Commander Julie-Ann Elizabeth Leo – For meritorious achievement in the introduction of battlefield mobility capabilities into the Royal Australian Air Force.
- Flight Lieutenant Tobias John Liddy-Puccini – For meritorious devotion to duty as the Fighter Combat Instructor at Number 75 Squadron and as Instructor of the inaugural Air Warfare Instructor Course at Number 2 Operational Conversion Unit.
- Corporal Daniel Joseph Maynard – For meritorious achievement in cyber security development at Number 462 Squadron, Royal Australian Air Force.
- Leading Aircraftman William John Newham – For meritorious achievement as the lead intelligence analyst for the Space Mission at Number 1 Remote Sensor Unit.
- Wing Commander Ray Gregory Simpson, OAM – For meritorious achievement in air warfare development as the inaugural Commanding Officer of Number 88 Squadron, Royal Australian Air Force.
