= Anstice =

Anstice may refer to:

== Surname ==
- David Anstice, Australian pharmaceutical executive and philanthropist
- John Henry Anstice (1897–1970), British Army officer during the Second World War
- Joseph Anstice (1808–1836), Classical scholar and sometime a professor of classical literature in King's College London
- Mark Anstice (born 1967), Scottish explorer and adventurous documentary reality television film maker
- Robert Richard Anstice (1813–1853), English clergyman and mathematician

== Given name ==
- Laurence Anstice Pavitt (1914–1989), a Labour and Co-operative Party politician in the UK

== See also ==
- Anstis
- Anstiss
