= Ketelsen =

Ketelsen is a surname. Notable people with the surname include:

- Kyle Ketelsen (born c. 1971), American bass-baritone opera singer
- Torsten Henry Ketelsen, Australian businessman

== See also ==
- Meanings of minor-planet names: 124001–125000#075
