= Creyke =

Creyke is a surname. Notable people with the surname include:

- Alfred Richard Creyke (1831–1892), British-born New Zealand politician
- Ralph Creyke (1849–1908), English politician
- Robin Creyke, Australian law professor
- Stephen Creyke (1796–1883), English Anglican priest
