= Anthony Gill (pathologist) =

Australian pathologist & professor (born 1972)

Anthony J Gill
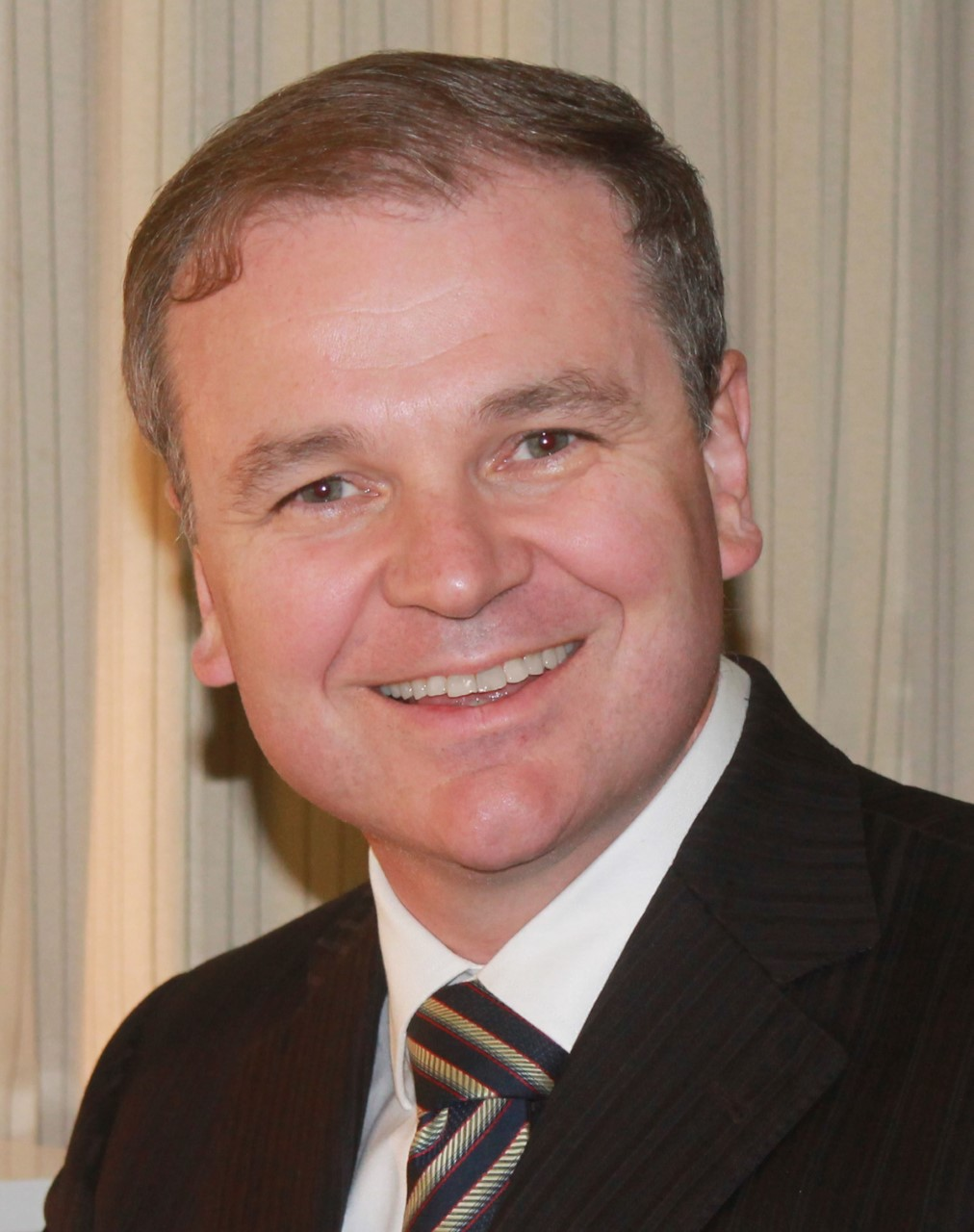
- Born: August 15, 1972 (age 54)
- Education: Shore School; University of Sydney
- Occupation: Pathologist
- Years active: 2000-present

Anthony J Gill AM is an Australian pathologist, professor of surgical pathology at the University of Sydney and the chairman of the Australian Pancreatic Cancer Genome Initiative - part of the International Cancer Genome Consortium. Most of his research is focused on translating the improved understanding of cancer gained at the basic science level into clinically useful diagnostic tests which can be applied in the routine surgical pathology laboratory.

In addition to his work on pancreatic carcinoma as chairman of the Australian Pancreatic Cancer Genome Initiative, Gill is best known for his description of the class of malignancies now known as succinate dehydrogenase deficient (SDH deficient) - including SDH deficient Renal Carcinoma and SDH deficient Gastrointestinal Stromal Tumour (GIST). He founded and leads the Cancer Diagnosis and Pathology Research Group at the University of Sydney and Kolling Institute of Medical Research. In 2017 he was presented with the Ramzi Cotran young investigator award by the United States and Canadian Academy of Pathology in recognition of his research. Gill is a standing member of the editorial board for the fifth edition of the World Health Organization/International Agency for Research on Cancer (IARC) classification of tumors.

== Awards and honors ==
- 2011 - The Benjamin Castleman Award
- 2011 - The Sir John Loewenthal Medal
- 2012 - NSW Cancer Institute Wildfire Award
- 2013 - NSW Premier’s Award for Excellence in Translational Cancer Research
- 2014 - The Sir Zelman Cowen Universities Prize for discovery in Medical Research
- 2015 - NSW Cancer Institute Wildfire Award
- 2017 - USCAP Ramzi Cotran Award
- 2018 - Queen's Birthday Honours - appointed Member of the Order of Australia
