= Rinaldo Bellomo =

Australian doctor (1956–2025)

Rinaldo Bellomo FRACP FAHMS

Personal details
- Born: 1956
- Died: 6 May 2025 (aged 68–69)
- Occupation: Intensivist

Rinaldo Bellomo AO (1956 – 6 May 2025) was an Australian intensivist and researcher. He was the Professor of Intensive Care Medicine at the University of Melbourne, Professor at Monash University, Honorary Professional Fellow at the University of New South Wales, Honorary Professional Fellow at the George Institute for Global Health and Honorary Fellow at the Florey Institute of Neuroscience and Mental Health. In 2018 he was awarded an Order of Australia for distinguished service to intensive care medicine as a biomedical scientist and researcher. In 2021 he and Jamie Cooper were jointly awarded the GSK Award for Research Excellence (ARE).

== Personal life ==
Bellomo was born in 1956 in Italy. He immigrated to Australia in 1980. He was married with a daughter. He died on 6 May 2025.

== Education ==
Bellomo moved from Italy to Australia in 1980, three years into a medicine degree at the University of Modena. He completed his medical degree at Monash University and received his PhD from the School of Public Health and Preventive Medicine. He was a fellow in the Multidisciplinary Critical Care Training Program at the University of Pittsburgh from 1992 to 1994.

== Career ==
Bellomo returned to Australia in 1994 and joined Austin Hospital in Melbourne as a staff specialist in intensive care. He was appointed Director of Intensive Care Research at Austin Health in 1997, a position he held until his death. He also served as Senior Research Advisor and Staff Specialist in Intensive Care at the Royal Melbourne Hospital.

In addition to his clinical roles, Bellomo held academic positions at several institutions. He was Professor of Intensive Care Medicine at the University of Melbourne and held honorary professorships at Monash University, the University of Sydney, Nanjing University in China, and the Università Vita-Salute San Raffaele in Milan, Italy. He was a co-founder of the Australian and New Zealand Intensive Care Research Centre (ANZIC-RC) and served as Foundation Chair of the Australian and New Zealand Intensive Care Society Clinical Trials Group (ANZICS-CTG). He was a Practitioner Fellow of the National Health and Medical Research Council.

Bellomo also served as Editor-in-Chief of the journal Critical Care and Resuscitation, the official publication of the College of Intensive Care Medicine of Australia and New Zealand, from 2007. He was a board member of the College from 2015 and served as its Continuing Medical Education Officer from the same year.

== Research ==
Bellomo's biomedical research encompassed basic science, laboratory, clinical, and translational work across a broad range of topics in acute care medicine. He is particularly associated with research in critical care nephrology, sepsis, fluid therapy, and perioperative care.

From 2014 to 2018, Bellomo was listed annually among the world's most influential scientific minds by Clarivate Analytics, based on citation data from the Web of Science platform. He has been described as the most published biomedical investigator in the history of Australian medicine and the most published intensive care investigator in the world. His Scopus h-index was over 160 at the time of his death.

== Honours ==
- Officer of the Order of Australia (AO), 2018 – for distinguished service to intensive care medicine as a biomedical scientist and researcher.
- GSK Award for Research Excellence (ARE), co-recipient with Jamie Cooper, 2021.
- 75th Anniversary Excellence Award, Royal Australasian College of Physicians, 2014.
- Named among the most influential clinical-scientists in acute medicine by Thomson Reuters, 2014.
- Victoria Public Healthcare Award for Excellence in Safety and Care, 2005.
- Distinguished Scientist Award, Austin Health, 2007.
- Member, Honour Roll, Australian and New Zealand Intensive Care Society.
- Fellow, Australian Academy of Health and Medical Sciences, since 2015.
