= Margaret Zacharin =

Australian endocrinologist and academic

Margaret Rosemary Zacharin AM is an Australian adult and paediatric endocrinology physician and researcher. She has won several major awards and held significant leadership roles in several Australian universities.

Zacharin graduated from the University of Melbourne with a bachelor of medicine and surgery in 1972 and she became a fellow of the Royal Australasian College of Physicians in 1978.

Zacharin works as a consultant endocrinologist at both the Peter MacCallum Cancer Centre and The Royal Children's Hospital, Australia. She was an associate professor at the University of Melbourne from 2004-2013 and in 2014 was promoted to professor at the University of Melbourne. She was also an adjunct professor with New England University from 2011-2019. Zacharin is an international editorial advisor for the Journal Of Pediatric Endocrinology And Diabetes.

== Awards ==
Zacharin has been the recipient of several awards including in 2009 the Elizabeth Turner Medal for clinical excellence; in 2016 the Robert Vines Medal for clinical excellence in paediatric endocrinology; in 2017 the European Society for Paediatric Endocrinology International Outstanding Clinician Award; in 2018 a Medal of the Order of Australia (OAM), which was announced in The Queen's Birthday 2018 Honours List; and in 2023 she was promoted to a Member of the Order of Australia (AM) for service to medicine, particularly to paediatric endocrinology.

== Publications ==
Zacharin is a highly cited author of numerous publications and books including a textbook on ‘Practical pediatric endocrinology in a limited resource setting’.
