= Roberta Shepherd =

Roberta Shepherd AO
- Born: 1934 (age 91–92); New South Wales, Australia

Academic background
- Education: University of Sydney (DipPhty); Columbia University (MA, D.Ed.)
- Thesis: Initial trunk position and biomechanical consequences in standing up (1991)
- Doctoral advisor: Ann Gentile

Academic work
- Discipline: Physiotherapist
- Sub-discipline: Pediatric physiotherapy
- Institutions: University of Sydney

Roberta Barkworth Shepherd AO (born 1934) is an Australian physiotherapist. She is known for her work on physiotherapy education and research.

== Early life ==
Shepherd was born in 1934 in New South Wales, Australia. She studied anatomy, physiotherapy, histology, chemistry and physics at the University of Sydney, graduating in 1956 with a Diploma of Physiotherapy. After winning a Fulbright Fellowship for doctoral study, she went to Columbia University, studying under Ann Gentile. There she received degrees, Master of Arts in 1986 and Doctor of Education in 1991.

== Career ==
After teaching in paediatrics at the School of Physiotherapy, Shepherd published her first textbook on physiotherapy in paediatrics in 1974 and began a scholarly collaboration with her friend, Janet Carr. They introduced the term "applied movement scientists" for physical therapists.

Together they recognised that motor learning/skill acquisition and motor control mechanisms gave information relevant to rehabilitation practice. During their collaboration they published many textbooks together including:

- Neurological Rehabilitation: Optimizing Motor Performance
- Stroke Rehabilitation: Guidelines for Exercise and Training to Optimize Motor Skill
- Physiotherapy in Disorders of the Brain
- Motor Relearning Programme for Stroke
- Movement Science: Foundations for Physical Therapy in Rehabilitation
- Neurological Strokes: Rehabilitation

Along with the textbooks written with Carr, Shepherd also wrote Physiotherapy in Paediatrics, and Cerebral Palsy in Infancy: targeted activity to optimize early growth and development. These textbooks have been translated into many different languages. As well as textbooks, Shepherd has published numerous scholarly articles around the topic of physiotherapy.

In 1991 Shepherd was appointed Professor and Foundation Chair of Physiotherapy at the University of Sydney and in 2014 she and Carr were named as Honoured Members of the Australian Physiotherapy Association. She has taught many students and in 2014 the University of Sydney honoured her with an Alumni Award.

Shepherd was made an Officer of the Order of Australia in the 2018 Queen's Birthday Honours for ''distinguished service to education, specifically to paediatric physiotherapy and stroke rehabilitation, as an academic and author, and to professional medical bodies".
