= Ivan Lednei =

Soviet footballer and coach

Personal information
- Full name: Ivan Ivanovych Lednei
- Date of birth: 4 November 1959 (age 66)
- Place of birth: Dovhe, Irshava Raion, Ukrainian SSR, Soviet Union
- Position: Midfielder

Senior career*
Years	Team	Apps	(Gls)
1970s–1978	FC Sudnobudivnyk Mykolaiv	67	(3)
1979–1981	FC Metalist Kharkiv	72	(2)
1982–1983	SKA Kiev	33	(1)
1984	FC Metalist Kharkiv	9	(0)
1985	SC Tavriya Simferopol	29	(0)
1986–1987	FC Mayak Kharkiv	89	(13)
1988	FC Zakarpattia Uzhhorod	46	(8)
1989	FC Mayak Kharkiv	26	(5)
1989–1991	FC Torpedo Zaporizhzhia	94	(7)

Managerial career
- 1992–1993: FC Aval Dovhe
- 1994: FC Zakarpattia Uzhhorod
- * Club domestic league appearances and goals

Ivan Lednei (Ukrainian: Іван Іванович Ледней; 4 November 1959) is a former professional Soviet football midfielder and coach.
