= Robyn Guymer =

Ophthalmologist and researcher

Robyn Guymer AM FAHMS
- Born: Robyn Heather Guymer
- Education: Walter & Eliza Hall Institute of Medical Research
- Known for: Ophthalmology
- Awards: Member, Order of Australia
- Scientific career
- Fields: Ophthalmology
- Workplaces: Melbourne University
- Thesis: A comparison of corneal, pancreas and skin allografts in mice (1991)

Robyn Guymer is an Australian ophthalmologist who was awarded an Elizabeth Blackburn Fellowship from the NHMRC, and works in ophthalmology at Melbourne University. Guymer is a senior retinal specialist within the Royal Victorian Eye and Ear Hospital, and is the deputy director, Centre for Eye Research Australia. She works in age-related macular degeneration as a clinician, academic, and researcher, and has used nano-lasers to treat Age-related Macular Degeneration.

== Career ==
Guymer was awarded her Ph.D. from the Walter and Eliza Hall Institute of Medical Research. She then trained in ophthalmology in Melbourne. Subsequently, she completed a medical retinal fellowship, in London, at the Moorfields Eye Hospital, with Professor Alan Bird. She directs a team of researchers who specialise in investigating age-related macular degeneration (AMD).

Guymer works in retinal disease and has researched both environmental and genetic risk factors for the condition AMD. She has also investigated predictors of the responses to treatments for late AMD. Guymer is a principal investigator in a range of trials. She is on pharmaceutical advisory boards, including as the Mactel consortium, the Beckman/Ryan AMD initiative (USA) in addition to the International Classification of Atrophy (CAM) group.

Guymer's career has involved investigating new strategies for the treatment of the early stages of AMD. She also researches imaging and functional biomarkers as well as surrogate endpoints with the goal of improving trials for early interventions. Guymer has supported other Early Career Researchers in studying and treating eye conditions at the CERA.

== Select publications ==
Guymer has over 11,000 citations and an H-Index of over 57, as at September 2019.

=== Peer-reviewed articles ===
R Guymer, P Luthert, A Bird (1999) Changes in Bruch's membrane and related structures with age. Progress in retinal and eye research 18 (1), 59-90.

LG Fritsche, W Chen, M Schu, BL Yaspan, Y Yu, G Thorleifsson, DJ Zack, et al. (2013) Seven new loci associated with age-related macular degeneration. Nature genetics 45 (4), 433.

LG Fritsche, W Igl, JNC Bailey, F Grassmann, S Sengupta, et al. (2016) A large genome-wide association of age-related macular degeneration highlights contributions of rare and common variants. Nature genetics 48 (2), 134.

== Awards, honours and recognition ==
- 2021: Victorian Honour Roll of Women inductee.
- 2019: Plenary at Science on the Swan.
- 2019: Named Lecturer at RANZCO's 50th Annual Scientific Congress.
- 2018: Member in the General Division (AM) in the 2018 Queen's Birthday Honours List, recognised for her "significant service to medicine in the field of ophthalmology, particularly age related macular degeneration as a clinician, academic and researcher".
- 2016: NHMRC's Elizabeth Blackburn Fellowship, for the top female researchers in clinical medicine.
- 2015: Fellow of the Australian Academy of Health and Medical Sciences.
