= Janet Carr =

Australian physiotherapist and academic

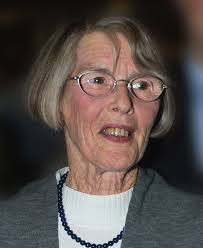
The photograph chosen to be used in an article summarizing Carr's work in The Journal of Physiotherapy

Janet Howard Carr (22 May 1933 – 4 November 2014) was an Australian physiotherapist and academic whose research focused on stroke rehabilitation. She was a professor at the University of Sydney and published numerous textbooks.

== Childhood ==
Janet Carr was born in 1933 to Howard and Gladys Carr. Carr is one of three children to Howard and Gladys Carr, and grew up on their sheep-grazing property at Kerr's Creek, 25 kilometres from Orange, New South Wales. She walked across paddocks to attend classes in a one-room one-teacher school, Kinross Wolaroi School, before going to board at PLC (now Kinross Wolaroi), in Orange. Being raised in the bush gave Janet a lifelong love of the Australian landscape and a firm belief in the value of education, especially for girls. She later moved to Sydney to study physiotherapy at the University of Sydney and graduated in 1955.

== Early career ==
In her early career as a physiotherapist, Carr worked in the United Kingdom, Canada and Switzerland before returning to Australia to work in hospitals in Mount Isa and Sydney. In 1973, she began tutoring in the field of neurological rehabilitation at the Royal Prince Alfred Hospital in Sydney. She also began writing academic texts with her colleague Roberta Shepherd; their first textbook was published in Australia in 1976. Their first textbook to be published internationally, Physiotherapy in Disorders of the Brain (1980), focused on treatments to help brain-damaged patients to relearn motor skills and was followed by The Motor Relearning Programme for Stroke (1982).

Carr was made a fellow of the Australian College of Physiotherapists in 1983 for her work in neurological physiotherapy. She was awarded a Kellogg Scholarship in 1984 to travel to Columbia University to study biomechanics and motor skill learning; this research earned her a doctorate. Carr and Shepherd's subsequent textbook, Movement Science: Foundations for Physical Therapy Practice in Rehabilitation, was published internationally and was particularly influential in the United States. Their textbook Neurological Rehabilitation: Optimizing Motor Performance, the product of a joint Rockefeller Grant, was first published in 1998 and revised in 2010.

Another example of Carr's work is her study in which she followed "a cohort of children with down syndrome, and their families from six weeks old, all the way through the age of 21, and beyond." In one of Carr's many books, she wrote a piece to help assist parents in raising children who are mentally disabled. In one review of this book, a woman named Mary Croxen reviewed her book saying that "They [the family of Down’s syndrome patients] also require assistance with two very fundamental aspects of the child-rearing process, which can indeed be broken down into specifics according to the approach adopted by Janet Carr".

== Summary of career ==
By 2010, Carr had written or edited 13 textbooks, most of them with Shepherd. Her main aim in writing these texts was to reconcile the gap between research and practice in physiotherapy. She visited thirty countries to teach and present research, and presented a lecture series at the University of Ljubljana in 2012. An example of the impacts Carr's lectures had on young pupils of the sciences is a personal account from Rebecca L. Craik in which she said "When I was a student learning how to treat people with neuromuscular disorders, the interventions were primarily passive. Carr and Shepherd embraced neuroscience findings on motor control and motor learning and emphasized the relevance of those findings in transforming clinical practice and adopting a new approach. They were successful in knowledge translation and helped to change care for people with neuromuscular disorders. Many would agree that they were pioneers in guiding faculty and clinicians in the evidence-based practice concepts that are used today." Another quote from Craik is "I had the privilege of meeting this wonderful lady when she was a doctoral student at Columbia Teachers College. She inspired me then, and the incredible contribution that she has made in transforming clinical practice continues to inspire me." Carr became a member of the Australian College of Physiotherapists in 2013 and was an honorary professor at the University of Sydney until her death in 2014.
