= Michael Barkl =

Australian composer and musicologist

Michael Laurence Gordon Barkl OAM, born 1958, is an Australian composer and musicologist.

== Biography ==
Michael Barkl was born in Sydney, New South Wales in 1958 into a musical family. He learnt classical piano from the age of seven, later becoming obsessed with the electric guitar after hearing the album Jimi Hendrix Band of Gypsys as a teenager. From rock guitar he expanded his interests into jazz guitar, and then into bass guitar and double bass. At the New South Wales State Conservatorium of Music he initially studied jazz improvisation with Roger Frampton, and followed this with degree studies in composition with Vincent Plush, Martin Wesley-Smith, Warren Burt, Ross Edwards, Don Banks and Graham Hair. Postgraduate studies in composition and musicology were with Ann Ghandar, Gerald Florian Messner, Richard Toop and Greg Schiemer. He graduated with a master's degree in composition (University of New England (Australia)) and doctorates in musicology (Deakin University) and electronic music (University of Wollongong).

After working as a freelance bass player, Barkl joined TAFE NSW in 1987 as foundation head of its contemporary music section. During this time he contributed a series of biographies of Australian composers to The Oxford Companion to Australian Music, A Dictionary of Australian Music, The New Grove Dictionary of Music and Musicians and The Oxford Dictionary of National Biography. Further publications documented the compositional techniques of Franco Donatoni and Riccardo Formosa, explored aspects of the economic and cultural contexts of music composition, and described the process of electronic music composition using the program Pure Data. He also published educational texts on composition, harmonic analysis and improvisation, and a volume of memoirs. From 1997 Barkl was foundation Adviser (later, Chief Examiner) of Contemporary Popular Music for the Australian Music Examinations Board.

== Music ==
Barkl's music exhibits a combination of influences from European styled modernism to jazz. An early work, Rota (1981) for piano trio, is clearly influenced by twentieth century Italian music, specifically Franco Donatoni. Perhaps unsurprisingly, it was awarded segnalata in the 1981 International Valentino Bucchi Composition Competition. A pair of subsequent orchestral works, Voce di testa (1981) and Voce di petto (1982), while maintaining the Italian association through their titles, added more jazz influence, however slight. Drumming (1983) was characterised as "an exciting piano piece", "bring[ing] together Indian tabla drumming with jazz pianism", while Ballade (1984) for six instruments, structured as a reverie interrupting a café piano solo, brought Barkl to the attention of the critics, Roger Covell describing him "one of the most musical of younger Australian composers". Subsequent works, such as Cabaret for orchestra, Blues for bass clarinet and percussion (based on a Charlie Parker riff), Disco for percussion quartet, Red for recorder (based on Jimi Hendrix’s Red House) and Smoky for harpsichord, developed Barkl’s jazz-inspired instrumental style until a complete change emerged with a series of lengthy electronic works composed using the open source patching language Pure Data. These used large banks of computer generated oscillators to build thick textures of sine waves, saturating the aural space.

== Honours ==
Michael Barkl was awarded a Medal of the Order of Australia in the 2018 Queen's Birthday Honours (Australia) for "service to the performing arts and music education".

== Selected works ==
=== Orchestral ===
- Voce di testa, 1981
- Voce di petto, 1982
- Iambus, 1982
- Cabaret, 1985
- Rondo, 1986

=== Ensemble ===
- Ballade for six instruments, 1984
- The laird of Drumblair for seven instruments, 1987
- Disco for four percussion and electronics, 1990

=== Chamber music ===
- Night Words for viola and piano, 1977
- Music for two trumpets and tape, 1978
- Rota for piano trio, 1981
- Expressive and ferocious for string quartet, 1985
- Blues for bass clarinet and percussion, 1986
- Vamp for guitar, 1988
- Red for descant recorder, 1996
- Smoky for harpsichord, 1997
- Coming Out, Fanfare for viola and double bass, 1998
- Here… for clarinet, piano and cello, 2008

=== Piano ===
- Jazz music, 1979
- Jazz music II for two pianos, 1979
- Drumming, 1983
- Five pieces, 1995

=== Choral ===
- Water, where are you going? SATB, 1984

=== Vocal ===
- Night words – the ravishing for mezzo-soprano and piano, 1977

=== Concert band ===
- Backyard swing, 1986

=== Music theatre ===
- The animals Noah forgot, 1988

=== Electronic ===
- Rosalia, 1980
- The paradox of Pythagoras: nos 1–27, 2007
- Music of the spheres: Mercury, Venus, Earth, Mars, Jupiter, Saturn, Uranus, Neptune, Pluto, 2007
- Music of Grace: The heavy dark trees line the streets of summer, 2007
- Music of Grace: The cat dances and the moon shines brightly, 2007
- Music of Grace: The crystals in the cave absorb the light as if they have not seen it in a million years, 2008
