= Suzanne Chambers =

Australian researcher in psycho-oncology

- Born: Suzanne Kathleen Bullock
- Education: Griffith University (PhD)
- Scientific career
- Workplaces: University of Technology, Sydney

Suzanne Kathleen Chambers AO, is a Professor and Dean of the Faculty of Health at Sydney's University of Technology. She specialises in psycho-oncology, and has received Queen's Birthday honours. Chambers has worked on psycho-oncology, prostate cancer, health economics and psychological interventions including the distress and adjustments after cancer.

== Research interests and career ==
Chambers career began with her work as a hairdresser before she became a registered nurse. She was awarded her PhD from Griffith University, in 2004, and then in 2011 she worked in Preventative Health, at Griffith University. Chambers led their "Strategic Investment in Chronic Disease". Her work on the usefulness of ‘mindfulness’ in cancer treatment as a complementary therapy was reported by The Conversation. Chambers is a health psychologist, as well as Dean. She is both a practitioner and researcher providing psychological support for people with cancer over three decades and she has specialised in prostate cancer.

As Dean of Health she was recognised in the 2018 Queen's Birthday Honours. Her research has been awarded $28 million in competitive grants. The Cancer Council Queensland, praised the impact of her work on patient recoveries.

== Publications ==
=== Books ===
- Chambers, Suzanne (2013). Facing the Tiger: A guide for men with prostate cancer and the people who love them. Australian Academic Press Group. ISBN 978-1-922117-05-2.

=== Selected articles ===
Chambers had an H number of 52 and over 9,500 citations, as at August 2019.

- Schumacher et al. (2018) Association analyses of more than 140,000 men identify 63 new prostate cancer susceptibility loci, Nature genetics 50:928–936.
- Eeles et al. (2009) Identification of seven new prostate cancer susceptibility loci through a genome-wide association study. Nature genetics 41:1116-1121.
- Steginga et al. (2000) The supportive care needs of men with prostate cancer Psycho-oncology 10: 66–75.

== Awards, honours and recognition ==
- 2018 – Chambers was part of the team CAHE which won the Vice Chancellors award for research excellence.
- 2016 – Chambers won an NHMCR, with $2.8 million in funding for the Centre for Research Excellence in Prostate Cancer Survivorship in Qld.
- 2012 – She was awarded ARC Future Fellow.
- 2012 – Chambers was awarded the William Rudder fellowship by the Cancer Council Queensland (CCQ).
