= Janis Cocking =

Australian metallurgist

Janis Cocking PSM FTSE
- Citizenship: Australian
- Education: University of Melbourne
- Known for: Submarine propulsion
- Awards: Public Service Medal (2018)
- Scientific career
- Fields: Metallurgy
- Workplaces: Defence Science and Technology Organisation

Janis Louise Cocking is a retired Australian metallurgist. Her last post before retirement was as Chief Science Strategy and Program at Defence Science and Technology Group, a branch of the Department of Defence. She retired on 25 July 2018.

== Career ==
Cocking completed her degree in metallurgy at the University of Melbourne and started work for Defence Science and Technology Organisation, initially in high-temperature alloys to develop a thermocouple for measuring high temperatures, to extend the life of turbine blades at the hot end of Royal Australian Air Force jet engines.

Cocking was appointed as visiting scientist at the United States Naval Research Laboratory.

On her return to Australia, Cocking worked on submarine and air independent propulsion systems, and coordinated a team working to remedy design issues with the Collins-class submarines and has been Research Leader Undersea Platform Systems, DSTO Submarine Science and Technology Co-ordinator, Director of the Maritime Program Office and Chief of Maritime Division before her current role as Chief of Science Strategy and Program Division. She was involved in development of Collins-class submarines, and in the requirements and design for the Collins-class submarine replacement project. She has also been a member of the board of the Australian Maritime College.

Cocking was awarded a Doctor of Engineering honoris causa by the University of Tasmania on 23 August 2014.

"Dr Cocking has played a substantial and active role in enhancing the interests, capabilities and international connections of the Australian Maritime College and the University. She has been the champion and major driver behind much of the extensive interaction between DSTO and AMC for many years. Her high-level support has culminated in important, strategic outcomes including Commonwealth Government support for major AMC facility upgrades and collaborative research projects. This has enhanced the reputations of both AMC and the University within the international defence community."

Cocking was awarded a Public Service Medal in the 2018 Queen's Birthday Honours (Australia) for her service to Defence science and technology. She has also been elected as a Fellow of the Australian Academy of Technological Sciences and Engineering.
