= Yvonne Engelman =

Australian Holocaust survivor (1927–2025)

Yvonne Engelman OAM
- Born: Jachat Chaja Engel; 9 October 1927; Dovhe, Czechoslovakia
- Died: 23 May 2025 (aged 97); Sydney, New South Wales, Australia
- Known for: Surviving the Holocaust
- Spouse: John Engelman (m. 1949; died 2015)
- Children: 3

Yvonne Engelman (9 October 1927 – 23 May 2025) was an Australian Holocaust survivor and volunteer at the Sydney Jewish Museum.

== Early life and captivity ==
Yvonne Engelman was born Jachat Chaja Engel on 9 October 1927 in the village of Dovhe, Czechoslovakia, now located in the Zakarpattia Oblast of Ukraine. She was an only child and grandchild.

In 1944, 5 years after the invasion of Czechoslovakia by Nazi Germany, her family were captured and taken to the Beregszász ghetto, before being transported to the Auschwitz concentration camp in occupied Poland four months later. She was separated from her parents just before their scheduled execution, being taken to a different gas chamber. The chamber that Engelman was sent to unexpectedly malfunctioned; not knowing what to do with her, the German camp guards put her to hard labour. As the Allied forces advanced on Poland, Engelman was sent to work in an ammunition factory in Germany.

== Emigration to Australia ==
In November 1948, Engelman made the decision to emigrate to Australia, despite not speaking English, wanting to "get as far away from Europe as I possibly could". In May 1949, she married John Engelman, another Holocaust survivor who had been orphaned, being the first wedding of Holocaust survivors in Australia. They had their first son in 1951; Engelman would go on to have 3 children, 9 grandchildren and 18 great-grandchildren. She became an Australian citizen on 9 April 1954.

== Later life and death ==
Engelman volunteered at the Sydney Jewish Museum every Tuesday from its 1992 opening until her death, sharing her experiences during the Holocaust. She was a member of the Australian Association of Jewish Holocaust Survivors and Descendants from the 1970s until her death, with her husband serving as the second president of the Association. She was the last surviving founding member of the Association. Engelman's husband died in 2015. She was awarded the Medal of the Order of Australia in the 2018 Queen's Birthday Honours "for service to the Jewish community". She traveled back to Auschwitz to commemorate the 75th anniversary of the liberation of the camp in 2020. She died on 23 May 2025, aged 97.
