= Anstis =

Anstis is a surname. Notable people with the surname include:

- John Anstis (1669–1744), English officer of arms and antiquarian
- John Anstis, younger (1708–1754), Officer of arms at the College of Arms in London
- Marion Anstis, Australian herpetologist
- Stuart Anstis, guitarist and songwriter, former member of Cradle of Filth
- Thomas Anstis (died 1723), 18th-century pirate
- Toby Anstis (born 1968), British radio presenter

== See also ==
- Anstice (disambiguation)
- Anstiss
