= Erica Smyth =

Australian geologist

Erica Lee Smyth is a Western Australian geologist, senior mining executive and chair of uranium exploration company, Toro Energy.

== Early life and education ==
Erica Lee Smyth grew up in Geraldton, Western Australia. Her father was an accountant, sailor, and amateur fisherman and her mother was a midwife at a maternity hospital. Her first job was working at a crayfish factory, cleaning crayfish tails during school holiday periods. She did not discover geology until she began her science degree at the University of Western Australia (UWA), where she initially focused on chemistry. She went on to complete a Bachelor of Science from UWA and later an Applied Master of Science from McGill University in Montreal, Canada.

She has expressed gratitude to her mother whose work afforded her the opportunity to pursue a tertiary education. More recently, Smyth has supported disadvantaged women to pursue education through the Centenary Trust for Women, which also provides access to small grants through a crisis fund.

== Career ==
Smyth began her career with BHP at Newman in the Pilbara region of Western Australia. Her later positions included 7 years as Principal Geologist for BHP Minerals and BHP-Utah Minerals International's Beenup Project Manager for 4 years. She then moved to BHP Petroleum as its Manager Gas Market Development WA and later joined Woodside Petroleum as General Manager – Corporate Affairs. She has been a professional company director since 2005. She has likened exploration geology to detective work, and considers among her strengths the abilities to identify expertise and build expert teams.

While working at Newman she was evacuated by the Royal Flying Doctor Service for emergency medical treatment. She had undiagnosed Type 1 diabetes which threatened her life. More recently in her career as a scientist and business leader, Smyth has chosen to "put back" into the RFDS through her role as director there, and similarly to the Diabetes Research Foundation through her role as chair.

She is a past chair of uranium explorer Toro Energy, past chair of Screenwest and past chair of science education organisation, [Scitech]. She is also a former director of the Australia Korea Foundation. She sat on several of the Western Australian Chamber of Minerals' committees in the 1990s and is a self-described advocate for the resources industry. She is a past member of the South Australian Minerals & Petroleum Expert Group which provides advice to the Government of South Australia's Department of State Development.

In March 2017 Smyth joined the Advisory board of the National Offshore Petroleum Safety and Environmental Management Authority (NOPSEMA) as Chair.

== Recognition ==
In 2008 Smyth received an Honorary Doctor of Letters from UWA.

In 2010 she received a Lifetime Achievement Award from the Western Australian Chamber of Minerals—the first of its kind for women in resources.

In 2012 she became an elected Fellow of the Australian Academy of Technological Sciences and Engineering. Smyth was appointed a Companion of the Order of Australia in the 2018 Queen's Birthday Honours.

== Memberships and other roles ==
As of 2022 Smyth was a member of Chief Executive Women, an Australian women's leadership organisation which represents over 300 of Australia's most senior female leaders.

Smyth is or has held the following roles:

- Non-executive Director Emeco Limited (ASX) (since 2011)
- Chair of Diabetes Research Foundation of Western Australia (since 2007)
- Deputy Chair of the Australian Nuclear Science and Technology Organisation (since 2009)
- Director Royal Flying Doctor Service Western Operations (since 2010)
- Director of the Deep Exploration Technologies CRC (since 2013)
- Director The Harry Perkins Institute of Medical Research (since 2013)
- Board Member of the International Centre for Radio Astronomy Research (ICRAR) (since 2016)

== Personal interests ==
Smyth has interests in the outdoors, visiting remote parts of Australia, amateur astronomy, and is particularly passionate about science and science education.

She also has an interest in the expanding human population and the pressure this is exerting on energy, water and food resources. She has justified her involvement in uranium exploration by expressing her belief in nuclear power being part of a necessary reduction in global carbon emissions.

"Clean energy (no CO²), nuclear (power), is part of the solution. It's not the only solution... it's got to be combined with all of the renewables and really new, smart technology and means of storing energy... but a lot of research is still needed in those areas whereas nuclear can be... an almost immediate part of that solution."
