= Dovhe, Zakarpattia Oblast =

Rural locality in Zakarpattia Oblast, Ukraine

Dovhe Довге
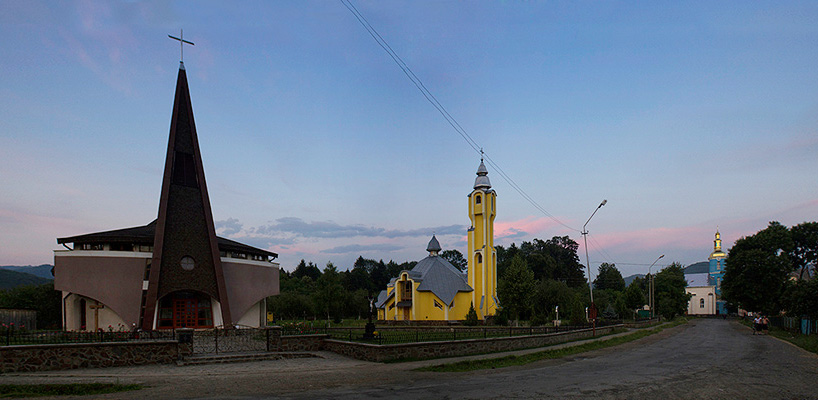
- Churches in Dovhe

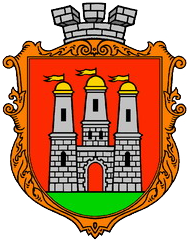
- Coat of arms

- Location in Zakarpattia Oblast Dovhe (Ukraine)
- Coordinates: 48°22′3″N 23°17′13″E
- Country: Ukraine
- Oblast: Zakarpattia Oblast
- Raion: Khust Raion
- Hromada: Dovzhanska rural hromada
- First mentioned: 1383

Population (2001)
  - Total: 6,790
- Time zone: UTC+2 (EET)
  - Summer (DST): UTC+3 (EEST)
- Postal code: 90154

Dovhe (Note: Rusyn: Довгое; Slovak: Dlhé; Hungarian: Dolha; Czech: Dolhoje) (Ukrainian: До́вге) is a village in the Dovzhanska rural hromada of the Khust Raion of Zakarpattia Oblast in Ukraine.

== Etymology ==
Between 1383 and 1404, the village is mentioned in written sources as Hossumezo (Ukrainian: Госсумезо; "Hozyowmezew" in the original)—from the Hungarian Hosszúmező, which translates to "long field". There are several written variations of the name Hosszúmező, the appearance of which is associated with the specifics of the old Hungarian orthography. (Note: For example: Hozyumezov, Hozyowmezew, Hazyomezew, Hezyomezeu, Hozyomezen, and Huzyumezeu.) From 1404, the name Dolha, meaning "long" has been used. In some documents from 1463, the name Naghdolha or Nagh Dolha is used.

== History ==
The first written mention of the village was in 1383. Historically, it had town status.

On 19 July 2020, as a result of the administrative-territorial reform and liquidation of the Irshava Raion, the village became part of the Khust Raion.

== Geography ==
From the southeast, Dovhe is surrounded by the low Khust mountains, and from the west by the mountain massif Velykyi Dil. Both massifs lie within the Volcanic Range of the Eastern Carpathians. From the north and northeast, the village is bordered by the southern spurs of the Polonyna Borzhava Range.

The Borzhava river flows through Dovhe. The mountain nature of the flow is only in the upper part to the village of Dovhe, where it flows along a mountain V-shaped valley in a southerly direction.

== Economy ==
Iron ore deposits are located in the area of the village.

== Religion ==
- Calvinist church (rebuilt from a chapel in the 18th century),
- Two Greek Catholic churches (1911; 2003),
- Roman Catholic church (1990s).
- Jewish cemetery

== Monuments ==
- Stone castle was in operation (1460–1474; constructed by Ambrozii Dolhai with the permission of the Hungarian king Matthias Corvinus),
- Teleki palace with a rectangular defensive wall with loopholes (1774).

== Notable residents ==
- Vasyl Nimchuk (1933–2017), Ukrainian linguist, Doctor of Philology, professor, head of the Department of History and Grammar at the Institute of the Ukrainian Language of the National Academy of Sciences of Ukraine, Corresponding Member of the National Academy of Sciences of Ukraine
- Ivan Lednei (born 1959), former professional football midfielder and coach
- Yvonne Engelman (1927–2025), Australian Holocaust survivor

The village was visited by the poet Mariika Pidhirianka.
