= Natalie Anne Kyriacou =

Australian environmental activist (born 1988)

Natalie Anne Kyriacou OAM
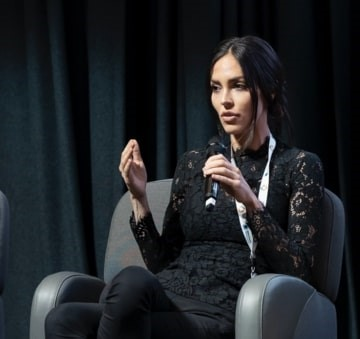
- Natalie Anne Kyriacou delivering speech
- Born: 1988 (age 37–38); Melbourne, Australia
- Education: University of Melbourne
- Occupations: Environmentalist, Social Justice Advocate, author
- Years active: 2013–present
- Known for: My Green World

Natalie Anne Kyriacou OAM (born 1988) is an Australian environmentalist, social justice advocate and author. She was appointed the Medal of the Order of Australia for her ‘services to wildlife and environmental conservation and education’ in 2018. She is a board director at the Foundation for National Parks and Wildlife, as well as CARE Australia. In 2023, she joined the UNESCO Green Citizens initiative as a Pathfinder. She is also known as the founder and current CEO of My Green World, which she founded in 2012 to promote wildlife and environmental conservation issues.

== Biography ==
Kyriacou was born in Melbourne, Australia. She holds a Bachelor of Journalism and a Master of International Relations from the University of Melbourne. She is the former Australian Director of veterinary aid charity Dogstar Foundation. In 2012, she founded My Green World. In 2016, Kyriacou developed the wildlife and environmental education and conservation app, World of the Wild, as the part of her wildlife and environmental conservation advocacy, which drew considerable media attention. In 2018, she was appointed the Medal of the Order of Australia for her "services to wildlife and environmental conservation and education". In the same year, she was the finalist for Young Champion of the Earth, organised by the United Nations Environment Programme and was featured in Forbes 30 Under 30. She also received 2020 Young Achiever Award for the Hellenic Australian Chamber of Commerce and Industry. In 2022, she was named as one of Australia's Top Innovators by The Australian. In August 2025, Kyriacou published Nature's Last Dance: Tales of Wonder in an Age of Extinction with Affirm Press.
