= Janeth Mumtaz Deen =

Australian Muslim community figure

Janeth Mumtaz Deen is an Australian multicultural community figure and the founder of the Queensland Muslim Welfare Association.

In 2018 Deen was awarded the Order of Australia for service to the multicultural community of Queensland. In a 5 Aug 2021 speech in the Australian Parliament, Queensland Senator Paul Scarr praised Deen's multicultural community work, describing Deen as "an ornament to our community in Queensland."

According to an Australian Broadcasting Corporation (ABC) report, some of Australia's Federal Cabinet Ministers were to gather on Tuesday, 30 June 2009 in Deen's shop in the Sunnybank suburb of Brisbane, Queensland, as part of a visit to the state ahead of a general election. Deen was named by the ABC as a member of the broadcaster's alternative 'Commonsense Cabinet' in the same report.
