= Joan Evans (charity worker) =

Australian charity worker (born 1931)

Sister Joan Evans, PBVM

Joan Kyrle Evans, PBVM, is a retired Australian religious sister born in 1931 who was based in the Klong Toei slums in Bangkok, Thailand. She is a member of the Western Australian Congregation of Presentation Sisters. Evans is a charity activist, who helps the needy youth and families in the slums of the Thai capital. Each fortnight, Evans' project supports around 100 babies with deliveries of powdered milk.

Prior to her work in Thailand, Evans taught mathematics and geography in schools throughout Western Australia. Postings included Iona Presentation College in the Perth suburb of Mosman Park, and Stella Maris Presentation College in the midwestern town of Geraldton. In 1992 she arrived in Thailand and established several charitable projects for the needy in Bangkok. Evans returned to Perth in early 2017, at age 84. Her volunteers continue a number of her projects.

On 11 June 2018, Evans was made an Officer (AO) in the General Division of the Order of Australia, "for distinguished service to the international community of Thailand through humanitarian assistance programs for the disadvantaged, and to improving the lives of women, children and the elderly".

Sister Joan Evans died on 29 September 2025 in Perth, W.A., Australia.

== Projects ==
- Education Project - supplying children and young adults from slum communities with school uniforms, shoes and bag
- Fares and Food - assisting children and young adults from slum communities with school transport and food costs
- Milk Run - supplying milk powder for needy young mothers
- Baby Kits - supplying essential items for newborn babies in slums communities
- Health Care Needs - assisting with medical treatment requirements
- Elderly Care and Support - providing assistance to the elderly in slum communities
- Family Food Project - providing basic food supplies of rice, cooking oil, noodles, eggs and fish for poor families in the slum communities
