= Christobel Saunders =

British-Australian oncologist

Christobel Mary Saunders AO, FRCS, FRACS (born 16 January 1963) is a British-Australian oncologist and breast cancer specialist, who holds the position of Winthrop Professor of Surgical Oncology at the University of Western Australia.

== Education and career ==
Saunders completed her medical training at the University of London, taking her Bachelor of Science with Distinction in 1986. In 1987, she won a Royal Society of Medicine Travelling Scholarship, before becoming a Fellow of the Royal College of Surgeons in 1991. Her early career was spent at hospitals in London and south east England, including Newham and Whipps Cross Hospitals. From 1991, she developed a research specialism at the Royal Marsden Hospital and the Institute of Cancer Research. In 1998, Saunders moved into teaching as senior lecturer and Consultant Surgeon at University College London Hospitals.

In 2002, she moved to Australia to take up the position of associate professor, University Department of Surgery, at Royal Perth Hospital and The University of Western Australia. In 2003, she became a Fellow of the Royal Australian College of Surgeons. She was Consultant Surgeon, at Sir Charles Gairdner Hospital from 2002 to 2011.

Saunders serves as a Consultant Surgeon at Royal Perth Hospital and St John of God Hospital in Perth, Western Australia. She is president of the Cancer Council Western Australia and Deputy Head of the School of Surgery at the University of Western Australia. She was the inaugural director of the Western Australia Cancer and Palliative Care Network and designed the state's Health Cancer Services Framework.

She is a member of the National Lead Clinician Group of Cancer Australia, a member of the Advisory Council of Cancer Australia, and a board member for the Breast Cancer Network Australia (BCNA).

Professor Saunders leads a mentoring program for women students of surgery and is an active member of the Women in Surgery network.

== Research ==
In 2010, Saunders was honoured with the National Breast Cancer Foundation (NBCF) Patron's Award for achievement in breast cancer research. Her research specialisms include minimally invasive diagnosis and treatment of breast cancer, including TARGIT; endocrine treatments in breast cancer; managing menopause symptoms in women who have had breast cancer; breast cancer and fertility.

In 2015, she reported to the Royal Australasian College of Surgeons’ on advances in 3D mammography, for improved accuracy in breast cancer screening.

== Publications ==
Saunders is a co-author of the books Breast Cancer—a guide for every woman and Breast Cancer: The Facts which was short listed for the BMA Book of the Year in 2010.

She has contributed chapters to a further 18 books and has published over 80 scientific papers and scholarly articles.

== Awards and recognition ==
Saunders’ awards include

- Certificate of Appreciation, Kuwait Breast Diseases and Oncoplastic Reconstructive Surgery Conference, 2010
- Vice Chancellor's Incentive Award for High Quality Research, The University of Western Australia, 2010
- Certificate of Outstanding Service, The Royal Australasian College of Surgeons, 2010
- Pink Ribbon Award for Breast Cancer Research, National Breast Cancer Foundation, 2010
- Aspire Royal Australasian College of Surgeons Convention Travel Grant, 2012
- Highly Cited Researchers and Authors, The University of Western Australia, 2010 and 2012
- ANSTO Eureka Prize for Innovative Use of Technology (finalist), 2012 and 2013
- Elected Fellow of the Australian Academy of Health and Medical Sciences, 2016.
- Western Australian Women's Hall of Fame, 2018
- Appointed Officer of the Order of Australia (AO) for "distinguished service to medical education in the field of surgical oncology, to the diagnosis and management of breast cancer and melanoma, as an academic, researcher and clinician," 2018
