= Ramzi Cotran =

Ramzi S. Cotran (1932-2000) was a pathologist and former president of the United States and Canadian Academy of Pathology (USCAP) and the American Society for Investigative Pathology (ASIP). He was chair of pathology at Harvard's Brigham and Women's Hospital and Children's Hospital Medical Center, as well as the Frank B. Mallory Professor of Pathology at Harvard Medical School and a member of the National Academy of Sciences' Institute of Medicine.

== Early life and education ==
Dr. Cotran was born in Haifa, Palestine and graduated from the American University of Beirut in 1956, where he also received his medical degree.

He pursued his postgraduate training in Pathology at Boston City Hospital’s Mallory Institute and at Memorial Sloan Kettering Cancer Center in New York City.

== Career ==
In 1960 he returned to the Mallory Institute as a Harvard faculty member, and in 1974 he was recruited to the Peter Bent Brigham Hospital as Chair of Pathology. In 1990, Dr. Cotran became the interim Chair of the Pathology Department at Children’s Hospital Medical Center in Boston.

== Award ==
The Ramzi Cotran Young Investigator Award is presented each year by USCAP to a pathologist in recognition of a body of investigative work which has contributed significantly to the diagnosis and understanding of human disease. The ASIP Cotran Early Career Investigator Award is presented each year by ASIP, and recognizes early career investigators who direct independent experimental pathology research programs that are focused on improvement of the understanding of the conceptual basis of disease.
