= Terry Bolin =

Australian gastroenterologist (1935–2022)

Terry Dorcen Bolin OAM (1935–2022) was an Australian gastroenterologist. Bolin founded the Gut Foundation in 1983.

In 1982, Bolin rejected Barry Marshall's abstract proposing that the bacterium Helicobacter pylori (H. pylori) caused duodenal ulcers. Marshall's abstract, which would eventually earn him a Nobel Prize, was submitted for presenting at a Gastroenterological Society of Australia meeting. Bolin, then Secretary of the Society, later likened himself to a manager who had turned down the Beatles.

H. pylori would go on to become one of Bolin's luminal gastroenterology clinical and research interests, which included acid reflux, malabsorption, colorectal cancer.

Bolin's 1995 book 'Wind Breaks: Coming To Terms With Flatulence,' co-authored with nutritionist Rosemary Stanton, was reviewed internationally.

In 2018, Bolin was awarded the medal of the Order of Australia for "service to medicine in the field of gastroenterology."
