= Anstiss =

Anstiss is a surname. Notable people with the surname include:

- Harry Anstiss (1899–1964), English footballer
- Jessica Anstiss (born 1996), Australian netball player

== See also ==
- Anstis
