= Alan Edward Bray =

Australian vascular surgeon (born 1942)

Alan Edward Bray OAM
- Born: May 10, 1942; Newcastle, New South Wales, Australia
- Education: University of Sydney (MBBS)
- Occupation: Vascular surgeon
- Known for: Introduction and postgraduate teaching of vascular ultrasound in Australia
- Awards: Medal of the Order of Australia (OAM) – 2018

Alan Bray is an Australian vascular surgeon.

Born in Newcastle on 10 May 1942, Bray graduated in medicine from Sydney University in 1966. He was awarded a Doctor of Medicine by the University of Western Australia for his thesis, "Immunity to a murine melanoma" in 1976.

Bray is known for the introduction and postgraduate teaching of vascular ultrasound in Australia, for which he received the Lifetime Achievement Award from the Australasian College of Phlebology. He was part of the first group of surgeons to form the International Society of Endovascular Surgery.

In 2018, he was awarded an Order of Australia Medal for his contribution to medicine, particularly vascular surgery.
