= David Anstice =

Australian pharmaceutical executive and philanthropist

David Westbrook Anstice AO is a retired senior pharmaceutical executive and philanthropist. Before retiring from Merck & Co in 2008 after a 34-year career with the company, Anstice played a key role in the global commercialisation of the HPV vaccine, which has significantly reduced cervical cancer incidence in young women.

In 2018, Anstice was appointed an Officer of the Order of Australia for "distinguished service to Australia-America business relations, particularly in the pharmaceutical field, through roles with multinational and educational organisations."

In April 2021, the University of Sydney awarded Anstice an honorary doctorate "in recognition of his outstanding contribution to business, education and the wider community."

In August 2022, Anstice made a contribution of A$100,000 towards the digitisation of the historic scientific collections at the Australian Academy of Science.

The University of Sydney has an Anstice MBA Scholarship for Community Leadership.

Anstice lives in Pennsylvania, with his wife, Ana-Maria Zaugg.
