= Torsten Henry Ketelsen =

Australian businessman

Torsten Ketelsen is an Australian businessman. Ketelson founded industrial garnet group GMA Garnet in 1987.

Ketelsen is described as having "very much created a market" for garnet, the hardest industrial sand, over a period of more than three decades. As of 2019, GMA Garnet had a 40 per cent share of the global market for garnet.

== Career ==
In 2016, Ketelsen, who is the former honorary consul of Germany in Western Australia, was awarded the Order of Merit of the Federal Republic of Germany.

In 2018, he was awarded an Order of Australia Medal for his service to Australia-Germany relations, to business, and to the community.

Ketelsen is a board member of the Perron Institute, a medical research organisation that focuses on neuroscience.
