= Robin Creyke =

Australian legal academic

Robin Creyke AO is an Emeritus Professor of law in Australia.

She graduated from the University of Western Australia (1966) and earned her Master of Laws from Australian National University (1991). Creyke joined the faculty of the College of Law at the Australian National University in 1985 and became a professor (specifically military law) in 2002. During her tenure, she served as the Alumni Chair of Administrative Law. From 2009-2014, she was appointed to the Administrative Appeals Tribunal (AAT) and served as a Senior Member.

Since 1985, Creyke has served as an editor (veterans’ affairs) of Administrative Law Decisions. Additionally, Creyke has authored works that pertain to military law, security law, and administrative law. She has contributed to the following publications:

- Duty of care: law and the direct care worker (1985) / Robin Creyke, Phillipa Weeks
- The Brennan legacy: blowing the winds of legal orthodoxy (2002) / editors, Robin Creyke, Patrick Keyzer
- Tribunals in the common law world (2008): Editor: Robin Creyke
- Control of government action: Text, cases and commentary (2005-2015) / Robin Creyke, John McMillan with Rocque Reynolds

In 2018, she was awarded an Officer of the Order of Australia.
