= Dragoș, Voivode of Moldavia =

Founder and Voivode of Moldavia, Knyaz in Maramureș

Dragoș the Founder
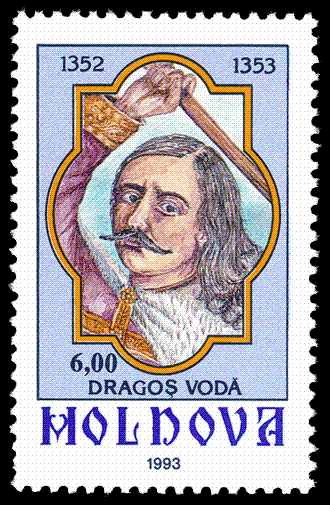
- 1993 Moldovan postage stamp

Voivode of Moldavia
- Reign: 1345/1359 – 1353/1361
- Successor: Sas
- Died: 1353/1361
- Burial: Volovăț, Principality of Moldavia
- Issue: Sas of Moldavia
- Dynasty: House of Dragoș
- Father: Giula of Giulești (debated)

Dragoș, also known as Dragoș Vodă or Dragoș the Founder, was the first voivode of Moldavia, who reigned in the middle of the 14th century, according to the earliest Moldavian chronicles. The same sources say that Dragoș came from Maramureş while chasing an aurochs or zimbru across the Carpathian Mountains. His descălecat, or "dismounting", on the banks of the Moldova River has traditionally been regarded as the symbol of the foundation of the Principality of Moldavia in Romanian historiography. Most details of his life are uncertain. Historians have identified him either with Dragoș of Bedeu or with Dragoș of Giulești, who were Vlach landowners in the Kingdom of Hungary.

Most Moldavian chronicles write that Dragoș came to Moldavia in 1359, but modern historians tend to propose an earlier date (1345, 1347, and 1352). Dragoș became the head of a march of the Kingdom of Hungary, which emerged after a Hungarian army inflicted a crushing defeat on a large army of the Golden Horde in 1345. Early sources say that he founded Baia and Siret, and invited Saxon settlers who introduced viticulture in Moldavia. According to the traditional dating, he died in 1361, but earlier years (1353, c. 1354 and 1357) have also been suggested by historians. Dragoș did not establish a royal dynasty, because his grandson, Balc, was expelled from Moldavia by Bogdan of Cuhea, another Vlach landowner from Maramureş.

== Origins ==
The early 16th-century Moldo-Russian Chronicle, which contains the most detailed description of the foundation of Moldavia, described Dragoș as one of the "Romans" who had received estates in Maramureș from "King Vladislav of Hungary". According to the chronicle, the king invited the "Romans" to fight against the Tatars and settled them in Maramureș after their victory over the invaders.

Modern historians' attempts to determine Dragoș's family connections and to describe his early life have not produced a broad consensus. According to a scholarly theory, he was identical with Dragoș of Bedeu, mentioned in a royal charter which was issued in late 1336. In that charter, Charles I of Hungary instructed the Eger Chapter to determine the boundaries of the domain of Bedeu (now Bedevlya in Ukraine) that he had donated to the brothers Drag and Dragoș. Drag and Dragoș were mentioned as the king's "servants", showing that they were directly subjected to the sovereign, like all noblemen in the Kingdom of Hungary. Historian Radu Carciumaru says that the identification of Dragoș of Bedeu with Dragoș, the first ruler of Moldavia has not been convincingly proven.

A second scholarly hypothesis suggests that another Vlach lord, Dragoș of Giulești, was the founder of Moldavia. He was the son of one Giula, son of Dragoș, to whom Charles I of Hungary granted two estates in Maramureș – Giulești and the nearby Nireș – at an unspecified date, according to a royal charter, dated to 15 September 1349. Giula and his six sons (Dragoș, Stephen, Tartar, Dragomir, Costea and Mirăslău) remained loyal to Charles I's son and successor, Louis I of Hungary, even when two other Vlach lords, Bogdan of Cuhea and Stephen, son of Iuga, tried to persuade them to turn against the sovereign. In revenge, Bogdan of Cuhea and Stephen expelled them from their estates. In his diploma, King Louis ordered John, the Vlach voivode of Maramureș, to reinstate Dragoș of Giulești and his family in the possession of their estates. Historians Victor Spinei and István Vásárhelyi say that Dragoș of Giulești and Dragoș, voivode of Moldavia were not identical.

Based on the similarity of certain place names in Maramureș and Moldavia, taking into account local folklore, historian Ștefan S. Gorovei proposes that Dragoș was a member of the Codrea family who held the domain of Câmpulung in Maramureș. He says that parallel toponyms – for instance, Bedeu in Maramureș and Bădeuți in Moldavia – show that Vlach groups from the region of Câmpulung settled in the basin of the Siret River. According to Carciumaru, no documentary evidence substantiates Gorovei's theory.

The Ragusan historian, Jacob Luccari, who completed his chronicle in 1601, wrote that Dragoș had been "the baron of Khust, a town in Transylvania" before moving to Moldavia. Khust was a fortified town in Maramureș in the 14th century. The Drágffys, who were descended from Dragoș, held Khust for a short period at the end of the century, but no document proves that Dragoș had ever held the same town.

== "Dismounting" ==
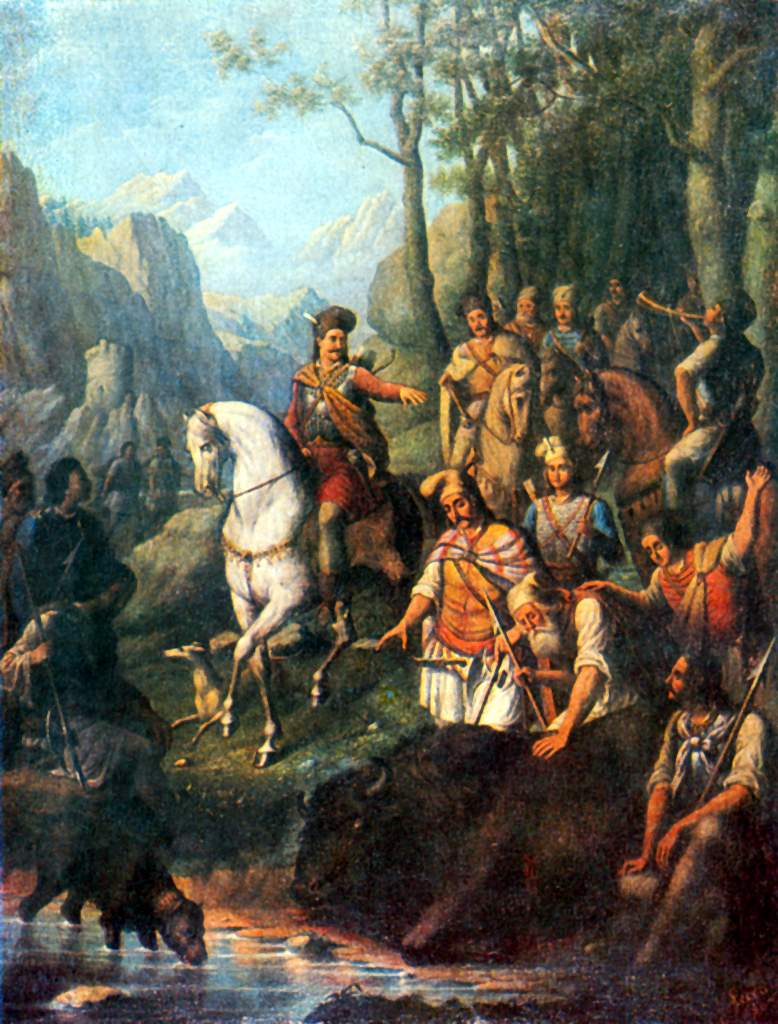
The hunt of Voivode Dragoș' for the bison (by Constantin Lecca)

The Moldavian chronicles preserved several variants of the legend of Dragoș's hunting for an aurochs or bison, ending with his "dismounting" by the Moldova River, which gave rise to the development of Moldavia. The Anonymous Chronicle of Moldavia contains a short summary: "In the year 6867 Dragoș Voivode came from the Hungarian country, from Maramureș, hunting an aurochs ...". The Moldo-Polish Chronicle preserved a more detailed story: "By the will of God, the first voivode, Dragoș, came from the Hungarian country from the town and river of [Maramureș], hunting an aurochs which he killed on the river Moldova. There he feasted with his noblemen, and liking the country he remained there, bringing [Vlachs] from Hungary as colonists ...". According to the most comprehensive Moldo-Russian Chronicle, after the hunting Dragoș returned to Maramureș to persuade the local Vlachs to accompany him back to Moldavia; they crossed the Carpathians after "Vladislav, the Hungarian king" permitted them to leave and they dismounted at the very place where Dragoș had killed the beast. On the other hand, the 17th-century Grigore Ureche did not mention Dragoș when narrating the legend of the "dismounting". According to Ureche's version, Transylvanian shepherds chased the aurochs and killed it at Boureni whose name is connected to the Romanian word for aurochs (bour). Ureche also stated that the head of an aurochs was put on the coat-of-arms of Moldavia on this occasion.

Scholar Mircea Eliade dedicated a separate chapter to "Voivode Dragoș and the ritual hunt" in his De Zalmoxis à Gengis-Khan ("From Zalmoxis to Genghis Khan"), published in Paris in 1970. He concluded that the two principal motifs of the legend – the hunting and the sacrifice of the aurochs – were probably based on an "authochtonous legend", describing a "heroic act" connected, for instance, to the foundation of a local chiefdom or to an act of colonization, even if the existence of a similar Dacian legend could not be proven. Eliade says that the legend of Dragoș's hunting was only stylistically influenced by the similar Hungarian legend of Hunor and Magor.

According to most chronicles, Dragoș arrived in Moldavia in 1359. The Moldo-Polish Chronicle is the sole exception, which states that Dragoș's "dismounting" occurred in 1352. Historians still debate the year of the foundation of Moldavia. Many historians (including Ștefan S. Gorovei, Dennis Deletant, Neagu Djuvara, and Constantine Rezachevici) propose an early date, 1347 or even 1345. They say that a successful Hungarian campaign under the command of Andrew Lackfi, Count of the Székelys, against the Tatars across the Carpathians in 1345 gave rise to the development of a defensive march, ruled by Dragoș. According to Deletant, the establishment of that border province was connected to the foundation of the Roman Catholic Diocese of Cumania, which was sanctioned, upon the request of Louis I of Hungary, by Pope Clement VI on 27 March 1347.

Other historians (for instance, Constantin C. Giurescu and Petre P. Panaitescu) accept the year proposed by the Moldo-Polish Chronicle (1352). Vlad Georgescu says that Dragoș had participated in the Hungarian campaigns against the Tatars before Louis I made him head of the border province around 1352. Finally, there are many historians (including Victor Spinei, István Vásáry, Tudor Sălăgean) who say, in accordance with the majority of the Moldavian chronicles, that 1359 was the year of the foundation of Moldavia. Vásáry writes that Dragoș came to Moldavia, taking advantage of the anarchy which followed the death of Berdi Beg, Khan of the Golden Horde, in 1359.

== Reign ==
Coat of arms of Moldavia

The Moldo-Russian Chronicle says that Dragoș and his people settled in the borderlands "where the Tatars were wandering". The exact borders of Moldavia during Dragoș's reign cannot be determined. Spinei and Andreescu write that it developed in the region that is now known as Bukovina. According to the local inhabitants' tradition, Dragoș set up his residence in Siret. The Moldo-Russian Chronicle attributed the foundation of both Siret and Baia to him. The 17th-century Miron Costin wrote that viniculture had been introduced in Moldavia by Saxon craftsmen who came upon Dragoș's invitation.

According to an interpolation by Misail the Monk in Grigore Ureche's chronicle, Dragoș's rule in Moldavia "was like a captaincy". When Misail the Monk made his remark in the 17th century, captaincy was a military unit, made up by villagers who were obliged to render specific military services. Earlier sources did not mention that Dragoș had participated in any military actions. Nevertheless, the fact that he was the head of a frontier zone of the Kingdom of Hungary shows that he and his retainers had an important role in the military actions east of the Carpathians.

Dragoș "reigned for two years", according to the Anonymous Chronicle of Moldavia and the Moldo-Polish Chronicle. Some historians (including Andrei Brezianu and Marcel Popa) write that Dragoș died around 1353. According to historian Dennis Deletant, Dragoș reigned for about seven years (until around 1354). Radu Carciumaru thinks that Dragoș died fighting against the Tatars in 1357. According to Victor Spinei, who accepts the narrative of the majority of the Moldavian chronicles, Dragoș died in about 1361. Dragoș was buried in a church in Volovăț.

== Legacy ==
Although most Moldavian chronicles attribute the establishment of Moldavia to Dragoș, that tradition "is not in keeping with contemporary sources", according to Victor Spinei. For instance, one Voivode Peter, supported by the local Vlachs and Hungarians, expelled his brother, Stephen, and defeated a Polish army at Şipeniţ (now Shypyntsi in Ukraine) in 1359, according to Jan Długosz and Filippo Buonaccorsi, which shows the existence of a Vlach polity in the lands which were integrated into Moldavia by the end of the century. Dragoș accepted the suzerainty of Louis I of Hungary. However, numerous local Vlach groups were opposed to the rule of the king. For instance, Louis I granted Dragoș of Giulești (whom some historian identify with the first voivode of Moldavia) six villages along the river Mara in Maramureș on 20 March 1360, because Giulești had "turned, with wakeful care and tireless endeavour, back to the path of unswerving loyalty ... many rebellious Romanians" in Moldavia.

Dragoș was succeeded by his son, Sas, according to the Moldavian chronicles. However, Dragoș did not establish a dynasty, because Bogdan of Cuhea came to Moldavia and expelled Dragoș's grandson, Balc. In compensation, Balc and his brother, Drag, received the former estates of Bogdan of Cuhea in Maramureș from King Louis I. Drag's descendants (members of the Drágffy family) held vast estates in the northeastern parts regions of the Kingdom of Hungary in the late 14th century. The list of the voivodes, recorded in the Bistrița Monastery in 1407, also shows that a "change of dynasty" occurred shortly after Dragoș's death, because it begins with Bogdan, without mentioning Dragoș and Sas.

== See also ==
- Foundation of Moldavia
- Etymology of Moldova

== Sources ==
- Andreescu, Stefan (1998). "The making of the Romanian principalities". In Giurescu, Dinu C.; Fischer-Galați, Stephen (eds.). Romania: A Historic Perspective. East European Monographs. pp. 77–104. OCLC 237138831.
- Brezianu, Andrei; Spânu, Vlad (2007). Historical Dictionary of Moldova. Scarecrow Press, Inc. ISBN 978-0-8108-5607-3.
- Carciumaru, Radu (2012). "The Genesis of the Medieval State on the Romanian Territory: Moldavia". Studia Slavica et Balcanica Petropolitana. 2 (12): 172–188.
- Deletant, Dennis (1986). "Moldavia between Hungary and Poland, 1347-1412". The Slavonic and East European Review. 64 (2): 189–211.
- Djuvara, Neagu (2014). A Brief Illustrated History of Romanians. Humanitas. ISBN 978-973-50-4334-6.
- Eliade, Mircea (1985). De Zalmoxis a Gengis-Khan: religiones y folklore de Dacia y de la Europa oriental [From Zalmoxis to Genghis Khan: Religions and Folklore of Dacia and Eastern Europe] (in Spanish). Ediciones Cristiandad. ISBN 84-7057-380-2.
- Georgescu, Vlad (1991). The Romanians: A History. Ohio State University Press. ISBN 0-8142-0511-9.
- Makkai, László (1994). "The Emergence of the Estates (1172–1526)". In Köpeczi, Béla; Barta, Gábor; Bóna, István; Makkai, László; Szász, Zoltán; Borus, Judit (eds.). History of Transylvania. Akadémiai Kiadó. pp. 178–243. ISBN 963-05-6703-2.
- Pop, Ioan-Aurel (2013). "De manibus Valachorum scismaticorum...": Romanians and Power in the Mediaeval Kingdom of Hungary: The Thirteenth and Fourteenth Centuries. Peter Lang Edition. ISBN 978-3-631-64866-7.
- Rădvan, Laurenţiu (2010). At Europe's Borders: Medieval Towns in the Romanian Principalities. BRILL. ISBN 978-90-04-18010-9.
- Sălăgean, Tudor (2005). "Romanian Society in the Early Middle Ages (9th–14th Centuries AD)". In Pop, Ioan-Aurel; Bolovan, Ioan (eds.). History of Romania: Compendium. Romanian Cultural Institute (Center for Transylvanian Studies). pp. 133–207. ISBN 978-973-7784-12-4.
- Spinei, Victor (1986). Moldavia in the 11th–14th Centuries. Editura Academiei Republicii Socialiste Româna.
- Treptow, Kurt W.; Popa, Marcel (1996). Historical Dictionary of Romania. Scarecrow Press, Inc. ISBN 0-8108-3179-1.
- Vásáry, István (2005). Cumans and Tatars: Oriental Military in the Pre-Ottoman Balkans, 1185–1365. Cambridge University Press. ISBN 0-521-83756-1.
- Vékony, Gábor (2000). Dacians, Romans, Romanians. Matthias Corvinus Publishing. ISBN 1-882785-13-4.

Dragoș, Voivode of Moldavia House of Dragoș Died: 1353-1361
Regnal titles
New title	Voivode of Moldavia; 1345-1359 – 1353-1361	Succeeded by Sas
