= Founding of Moldavia =

The founding of Moldavia (Romanian: Descălecatul Moldovei) was an event, traditionally dated to 1346, when a Vlach military leader (voivode), Dragoș, departed the Voivodeship of Maramureș in Transylvania and travelled eastwards with his fellow people to further settle the plain lying in between the Eastern Carpathians and the Prut river. This was incentivised by the Kingdom of Hungary who, after several military victories in the 1340s, drove the nomadic Mongols and Tatars out the region, which in turn facilitated expansion and settlement east of the Carpathians. Dragoș initially established a defensive borderland, protecting the Kingdom's eastern flank. 13 years later, Bogdan I, another Vlach voivode from Maramureș who had fallen out with King Louis of Hungary, crossed the Carpathians in 1359 and took control of Moldavia, wrenching the region from Hungary's vassalage and turning the borderland into a principality. For the next five centuries, the Principality of Moldavia would be an important player in regional affairs until its union with Wallachia in 1859, initiating the establishment of the modern Romanian state.

== Cultural dynamics in the future region of Moldavia ==
Moldavia developed in the lands between the Carpathian Mountains and the Dniester River, which had been dominated by nomadic Turkic peoples—the Pechenegs, Ouzes and Cumans—from around 900. The Golden Horde—a Mongol and later Turkicized khanate—took control of the lands east of the Carpathians in the 1240s. The Mongols promoted international commerce, and an important trade route developed along the Dniester. The circulation of Hungarian and Bohemian coins shows that there were also close economic contacts between the basin of the Moldova and Central Europe in the early 14th century. In addition to the Turkic rulers, medieval chronicles and documents mention other peoples who lived between the Carpathians and the Dniester, including the Ulichians and the Tivercians in the 9th century, and the Brodnici and the Alans in the 13th century.

The Vlachs' presence in that territory is well documented from the 1160s onwards. Their local polities were first mentioned in the 13th century: the Mongols defeated the Qara-Ulagh, or Black Vlachs in 1241, and the Vlachs invaded Galicia in the late 1270s. Even when dependent on their on Turkic conquerors, the Vlachs formed unions of territorial communities or agrarian communes, called "țări" (from Latin terra 'land'), throughout Moldavia, such as the ones in Vrancea, Câmpulung Moldovenesc, Tigheci and Sipenit. The rulers of the țări had the responsibility of gathering and paying tribute to the Golden Horde. Several such unions of țări would elect a military leader, titled voivode, and the territory governed by him would be called a voivodeship, such as the ones at Onuțu (near Hotin), Hanșca (in the Lăpușna region), Suceava and Bârlad. These political formations were older than the voivodeship founded by Dragoș and were later integrated into the unified principality of Moldavia.

=== The Vlachs—the earliest Romanians—and their neighbors ===
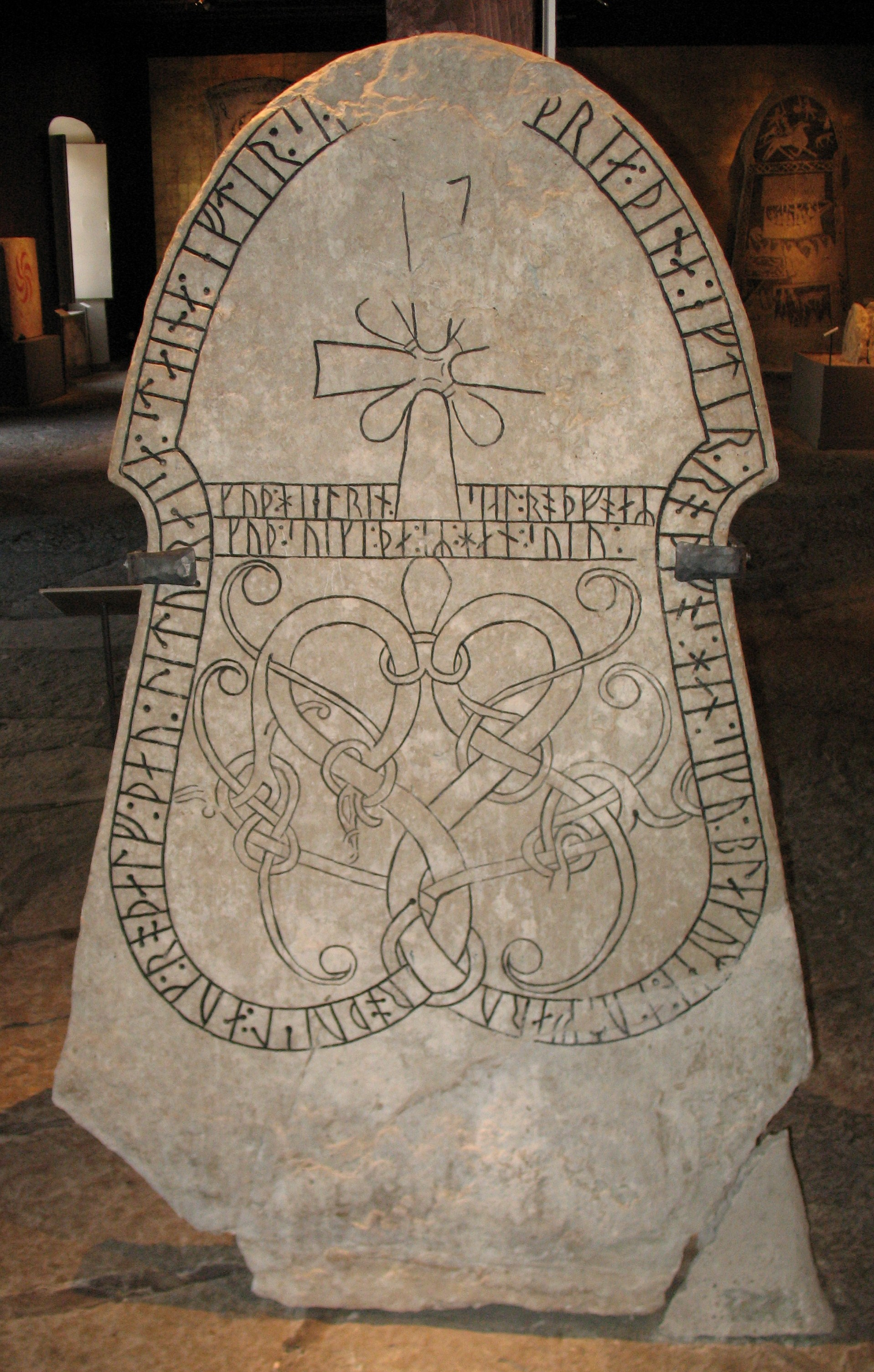
The 11th-century runestone G134 referring to "Blakumen" whom many historians identified as Vlachs or Bulaqs (Sjonhem cemetery, Gotland, Sweden)

The Moldavian region—the lands between the Eastern Carpathians and the Dniester River—acquired a territorial identity in the 14th century. During the previous millennium, the region had been subject to invasions by nomadic peoples, followed by a peaceful period around 750, during the Khazar Khaganate, which led to population growth in the region. A new material culture—the "Dridu culture"—spread in the lands along the Lower Danube (in both present-day Bulgaria and Romania) and in the territory east of the Carpathians. After the arrival, in the 830s, of the Magyars in the Pontic steppes north of the Black Sea, the local inhabitants fortified their settlements with palisades and deep moats along the Dniester in the 9th century. The Ulichians, Tivercians, "Waladj", and "Blaghā" are ethnic groups that have been connected with the Vlachs, or Romanians, of the region of the Carpathians.

Victor Spinei has suggested that a runestone which was set up around 1050 contains the earliest reference to Romanians living east of the Carpathians. It refers to Blakumen who killed a Varangian merchant at an unspecified place.

A competing group, the Magyars, left the Pontic steppes for the Carpathian Basin after a coalition of the Pechenegs and the Bulgarians defeated them at the end of the 9th century. The Pechenegs took control of the territory, but most Dridu settlements survived their arrival. Only the fortifications were destroyed in the 10th or early 11th centuries. New settlements appeared along the lower course of the Prut. The local inhabitants' burial rites radically changed: inhumation replaced cremation and no grave goods can be detected after around 1000.

Soviet historiography, with a few exceptions, denied the presence of a Romanian indigenous element in Moldavia during the 10th to 13th centuries, suggesting that they came to these lands from Transylvania, particularly from Maramureș, following voivode Dragoș. The indigenous population was, according to them, only Slavic and were forced to leave due to the nomadic invasions. In this historical framework, the migration of the Romanians to areas vacated by the Slavs was seen as a chaotic process. Authors of this theory, such as V. Zelenciuk and L. Polevoi, claim that written sources from the 13th–14th centuries sometimes referred to the territory between the Dniester and Prut rivers as Rosovlahia or Moldoslavia.

On the other hand, Romanian historian Ion Eremia noted that Byzantine sources do not contain the term 'Moldoslavia', which only appears in Ukrainian folklore, and that the term cannot be dated to the 13th–14th centuries. Meanwhile, the term 'Rossovlahia' is considered to be of Byzantine origin and means 'the Wallachia near Russia', suggesting a large Romanian indigenous population.

Anthropologist Henry H. Stahl, in examining medieval documents up until 1449, found that they mention a total of 755 Moldavian settlements, out of which 607 predate the establishment of the principality of Moldavia by Dragoș, also suggesting that there was a large indigenous Romanian population. Russian historian L.L. Polevoi concluded, based on rural toponyms, that, by the middle of the 14th century, 73.8% of the names of villages in Moldavia were of Eastern Roman origin and 24.5% of Slavic origin, while the ethnic groups in Moldavia were as follows: 48.7% were Romanian, 39.5% were Eastern Slavs, 3.3% were Southern Slavs and 8.5% were another ethnicity. However, Russian historian G.G. Litavrin, studying the Vlach communities in the Balkans, concluded that Polevoi's study is unconvincing, as the Vlachs used to adopt personal and place names from other people, including the Slavs. This is not a phenomenon exclusive to the Vlachs; for example, many Bulgarians' personal names and villages names from the same period were Greek, which does not imply an assimilation of the Bulgarians by the Greeks, but rather the adoption of Greek personal and place names by the Bulgarians. As such, Litavrin argues, toponymical data cannot be used as reliable proof of an ethnic situation.

Romanian historian Ion Eremia further criticizes Polevoi's method, considering his calculations uses to estimate the number of villages in Moldavia to be dubious, and the formation of exact data out of personal estimations to be erroneous. He argues that the migration of Slavs from Galicia to Bukovina in the 14th–16th centuries, which is well known and accepted even among Soviet historians such as T.V. Kosmina and V.V. Grabovetski, led to the Slavs founding new settlements. As a result, a large number of new villages appeared in the region; thus, they cannot be used as evidence of Slavic presence before the founding of Moldavia, and prove L.L. Polevoi's estimations of the ethnic group percentage to be inaccurate. Furthermore, his estimation about the number of villages in Moldova is very liberal. Polevoi estimates that there were about 800 villages in the 14th century and 1000 villages by the end of the 14th century, with a very large margin of error of about 200 villages. By Polevoi's own calculations, with each village having 15 houses containing families made of 5 people, that margin of error is 15,000 people, or 19.1% of the total population, according to his own population estimations of 78,480 people. One cannot create such specific estimations of 48.7% Romanians and 39.5% Eastern Slavs with such a large margin of error.

According to Polevoi's study, 596 Moldavian villages had 41,720 inhabitants, which made up 48.5% of the total population, but 322 East Slavic villages had 31,020 inhabitants, making up 39.5% of the population. Polevoi justifies this by saying that villages in East Slavic regions were larger. Following his own formula, he would have ended up with a population of 44,700 Moldovians and 24,150 Slavs. Polevoi does not explain how calculated the population of each particular village, but they do not follow the author's own formula, which indicates that numbers are entirely arbitrary and have been adjusted to fit a preconceived idea. Eremia also points out that one fact left out by Polevoi was the Slavicization of place names in the 14th–16th centuries by the Moldavian chancery, caused by the use of Old Church Slavonic. Historian N.A. Demcenco found out that the villages of Goluboi, Potok, Sredne Vodeanoe, Dibrovo, Krasnoilsk, Mejdurece and Dubovka were inhabited by Romanians; had he relied exclusively on toponymical data, he would have concluded that the villages weee inhabited by Slavs. According to Ukrainian historian N. Kotlear, the borders of the Principality of Halicz did not extend southward beyond the cities and castles of Vasilev, Onut, Bakota, Ușița, Kalius, Kucelmin, located on the upper course of the Dniester River.

=== Mongol invasion and occupation ===
According to the Persian historian, Rashid-al-Din Hamadani, a Mongol army "proceeded by way of the Qara-Ulagh, crossing the mountains … and defeating the Ulagh peoples" during the Mongol invasion of 1241. His narrative shows that the "Quara-Ulagh," or Black Vlachs, lived in the Eastern or Southern Carpathians. Giovanni di Plano Carpini, a papal envoy to the Great Khan of the Mongols, met a "Duke Olaha" who "was leaving with" his retinue to the Mongols in 1247. Victor Spinei, Vlad Georgescu and other historians identify this duke as a Vlach ruler, because his name is similar to the Hungarian word for Vlach (oláh), but the name may also have been a version of Oleg. Friar William of Rubruck, who visited the court of the Great Khan in the 1250s, listed "the Blac", or Vlachs, among the peoples who paid tribute to the Mongols, although the Vlachs' territory is uncertain. Rubruck described "Blakia" as "Assan's territory" south of the Lower Danube, identifying it with the northern regions of the Second Bulgarian Empire.

Archaeological finds—kilns to produce pottery and furnaces to puddle iron ore—identify towns that were important economic centers of the Golden Horde. At Orheiul Vechi, the ruins of a mosque and a bath were also excavated. The local inhabitants used high quality ceramics (amphorae-like vessels, pitchers, mugs, jars and pots), similar to those found in other parts of the Golden Horde. The Mongols supported international commerce, which led to the formation of a "Mongol road" from Kraków along the Dniester. Almost 5000 Mongol coins from the first half of the 14th century have been excavated in the same region. At the mouth of the Dniester, Cetatea Albă (now Bilhorod-Dnistrovskyi in Ukraine) developed into an important emporium. It was established by Genoese merchants in the late 13th century.

Weapons and harness pieces from the 13th and 14th centuries that have been found, together with agricultural tools at Vatra Moldoviței, Coșna and Cozănești, show the existence of either local elites or armed peasant groups between the Carpathians and the upper courses of the Siret. Hungarian and Bohemian coins were in circulation in the same territory during the first half of the 14th century. The local inhabitants used pottery of lower quality than those used in the lands directly controlled by the Mongols.

=== Decline of the Golden Horde ===
The earliest contemporary reference to Romanians in Maramureș was recorded in a royal charter in 1326. In that year, Charles I of Hungary granted the "land Zurduky" (now Strâmtura in Romania) in the "district of Maramureș" to a Vlach noble, Stanislau Bârsan. According to the Moldo-Russian Chronicle, which was preserved in a Russian annal completed in 1505, King Vladislav of Hungary sent envoys to invite the "Old-Romans and the Romanians" to fight against the Mongols and afterwards he rewarded the "Old Romans" with lands in Maramureș. Historians Ionel Cândea and Dumitru Țeicu identify this event to be the battle of Hód Lake (1280), Cuman opponents being substituted in the chronicle by Tatars. Historians Pavel Parasca and Șerban Papacostea identify "King Vladislaus" with Ladislaus IV of Hungary who reigned between 1270 and 1290. With the disintegration of the Golden Horde after the death of Öz Beg Khan in 1341, both Poland and Hungary started to expand towards the steppe zone in the 1340s. Casimir III of Poland invaded the Principality of Galicia in 1340. Two 14th-century chronicles—one by John of Küküllő and the other by an anonymous Minorite friar—say that King Louis I of Hungary dispatched Andrew Lackfi, Count of the Székelys, to lead an army of Székely warriors against the Mongols who had made raids in Transylvania. Lackfi and his army inflicted a crushing defeat upon a large Mongol army on 2 February 1345. The Székelys again invaded the "land of the Tatars" in 1346. According to both chronicles, the Mongols withdrew as far as the Dniester after their defeats. Archaeological research shows that forts were erected at Baia, Siret, Piatra Neamț and Târgu Trotuș in the late 1340s.

== The founding of Moldavia ==
Both Poland and Hungary took advantage of the decline of the Golden Horde to start a new expansion in the 1340s. After a Hungarian army defeated the Mongols in 1345, new forts were built east of the Carpathians. Royal charters, chronicles and place names show that Hungarian and Saxon colonists settled in the region. Dragoș took possession of the lands along the Moldova with the approval of King Louis I of Hungary. The voivodate, founded by Dragoș and recorded under the name of Moldavia, had its center in Baia. The goal of the new Moldavia was to defend the passes in the Eastern Carpathians, through which the Tatars could cross into the Kingdom of Hungary. Being a borderland and a watchful territory, Dragoș's Moldavia was a kind of royal military fief.

Upon his death, Dragoș was succeeded by his son, Sas, who was in turn succeeded by his son Balc after his passing. The Vlachs in Moldavia rebelled against Balc's rule in the late 1350s. Balc was expelled from Moldavia by a former voivode of the Voivodeship of Maramureș, Bogdan who crossed the Carpathians and took command of the revolt. Bogdan, who resisted Louis's military attempts to restore Hungarian suzerainty for several years, was the first independent ruler of Moldavia. The earliest Moldavian silver and bronze coins were minted in 1377. The Ecumenical Patriarchate of Constantinople acknowledged the Metropolitan See of Moldavia, after years of negotiations, in 1401.

The dates on coins found in the area indicate the change of status of Moldavia from Mongolian rule to Vlach rule. The minting of Mongol coins continued in Orheiul Vechi until 1367 or 1368, showing that a "late Tatar state" survived in the southern region between the Prut and the Dniester. No Mongol coins minted after 1368 or 1369 have been found in the region of the Dniester, showing that the Mongol rulers did not control the territory any more. Moldavia initially included a small territory between the Prut and Siret. Louis exempted the merchants of "Demetrius, Prince of the Tatars" from paying taxes in Hungary in exchange for securing the tax exempt status of the merchants of Brașov in "the country of Lord Demetrius".

Historians have different estimations regarding the exact chronology of the founding of Moldavia, estimating that the reign of Dragoș was somewhere between 1345-1361, Sas between 1353-1364, Balc between 1357-1364, and Bogdan between 1357–1367. The only constants are that Dragos became ruler of Moldavia somewhere after 1340s, that he was then succeeded by his son Sas, and that Balc was dethroned by Bogdan in the same year he became voivod of Moldavia. Ștefan S. Gorovei establishes the following chronology: Dragoș reigned from 1345-1354, Sas from 1354-1359, Balc in 1359 and Bogdan I from 1359-1367. After his death, Bogdan was followed by Petru I who reigned from 1367-1368, Lațcu from 1368-1373, Costea from 1373-1375, Petru II Mușat from 1375-1391, Roman I from 1391-1394, Ștefan I from 1394-1399 and Iuga from 1399-1400.

N	Name	Known As	Reign			Born	Died	Dynasty
1.	Dragoș I	Dragoș the Founder	cca. 1345	—	cca. 1354	unknown	cca. 1354	House of Dragoș
2.	Sas		cca. 1354	—	cca. 1359	unknown	cca. 1359	House of Dragoș
3.	Balc		cca. 1359			unknown	1399	House of Dragoș
4.	Bogdan I	Bogdan the Founder	cca. 1359	—	1367	before 1307	1367	House of Bogdan
5.	Petru I		1367	—	1368	unknown	1368	House of Bogdan
6.	Lațcu		1368	—	1373	cca. 1345	1373	House of Bogdan
7.	Costea		1373	—	1375	cca. 1328	cca. 1387	House of Bogdan-Mușat
8.	Petru al II-lea	Petru Muşat	1375	—	1391	unknown	1391	House of Bogdan-Mușat
9.	Roman I		1391	—	1394	unknown	1394	House of Bogdan-Mușat
10.	Ștefan I		1394	—	1399	cca. 1364	1399	House of Bogdan-Mușat
11.	Iuga	Iuga the Crippled	1399	—	1400	unknown	1400	House of Bogdan-Mușat

=== Arrival of Dragoș in Moldavia and his "dismounting" there ===
The Coat of arms of Moldavia, depicting an aurochs, the probable quarry in Dragoș' hunt

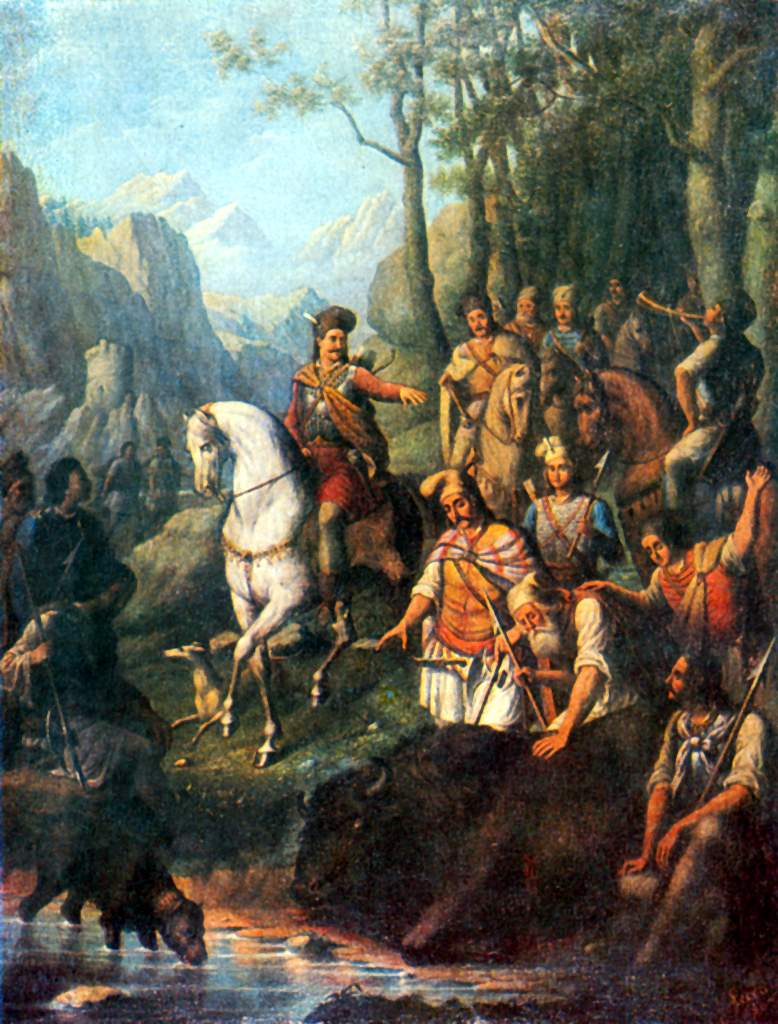
Voivode Dragoș's hunt for the bison (by Constantin Lecca)

Romanian histories cite Moldavian chronicles which credit Dragoș, a Vlach ruler, with the founding of Moldavia. According to legend, he led a hunting party to the region and dismounted from his horse at the Moldova River—hence the name of this event, descălecat or "dismounting". It was during this hunting trip that he judged the region to be more attractive for his people than the Land of Maramureș in the Kingdom of Hungary, where they were then living. One theory by Stefan Andreescu suggests that the Land of Maramureș was one of the "Romanias" where Eastern Romance ethnic groups (known as Vlachs in the Middle Ages) had survived the Great Migrations. A concurrent theory by István Vásáry suggests that the Vlachs of Maramureș came from Great Vlachia (in present-day Greece) in the second half of the 13th century.

According to the early 16th-century Moldo-Russian Chronicle, the Vlachs came to Maramureș during the reign of King Vladislaus of Hungary to fight against the Mongols. This document represents Dragoș as one of the Romanians to whom "King Vladislav" had granted estates in Maramureș. According to the various versions of the legend of his "dismounting", Dragoș left for a hunt, together with his retainers. While chasing an aurochs or bison, they reached as far as the Moldova River, where they killed the beast. They liked the place where they stopped and decided to settle on the banks of the river. Dragoș went back to Maramureș only to return with all his people "on the fringes of the lands where the Tatars roamed". Ritual hunts which end with the establishment of a state, a town or a people are popular elements of the folklore of various peoples of Eurasia, including the Hungarians and the Lithuanians.

The "dismounting" by Dragoș took place in 1359, according to most Moldavian chronicles, except for the Moldo-Polish Chronicle which gives 1352 as the date. However, the same chronicles add various years when determining the period between Dragoș's arrival to Moldavia and the first year of the reign of Alexander the Good in 1400. For instance, the Anonymous Chronicle of Moldavia mentioned 44 years, but the Moldo-Russian Chronicle wrote of 48 years. Consequently, the date of the dismounting is debated by modern historians. For instance, Dennis Deletant says that Dragoș came to Moldavia soon after the establishment of the Diocese of Milkovia in 1347. Neagu Djuvara, however, estimates the foundation of Moldavia to around the time of Andrew Lackfi's decisive victory over the Tatars in 1345.

Moldavia emerged as a "defensive border province" of the Kingdom of Hungary. A version of Grigore Ureche's chronicle stated that Dragoș's rule in Moldavia "was like a captaincy", implying that he was a military commander. King Louis I of Hungary described Moldavia as "our Moldavian land". The province initially included the northwestern part of the future principality (now known as Bukovina). In 1360, Louis granted estates to a Vlach lord, Dragoș of Giulești, for subjugating the Moldavian Vlachs who had revolted against Louis. The identification of Dragoș of Giulești with the first ruler of Moldavia is debated among scholars.

In the time of King Vladislav, the Tatars led by their prince, Neymet advanced from the waters of the Prut and the Moldova against the Hungarians. … King Vladislav … sent envoys to the Old-Romans and the Romanians. Thereupon we, Romanians joined forces with the Old-Romans and came to Hungary to help King Vladislav. … Before long, the decisive battle was fought between the Hungarian king, Vladislav, and the Tatar prince, Neymet, along the banks of the Tisa. The Old-Romans started the fight, preceding everybody else. They were followed by the masses of the Hungarians and the Romans who were in the Latin faith. Thus the Tatars were defeated first by the Old-Romans, then by the Hungarians and the Romanians. … Vladislav, the Hungarian king rejoiced over the divine assistance. He highly appreciated and rewarded the Old-Romans for their courage. … [T]hey asked King Vladislav not to force them to adopt the Latin faith, but to let them keep their own Christian faith according to the Greek rite and to grant them a place to stay. King Vladislav … granted them lands in Maramureș between the Mureș and Tisa at a place called Crij. The Old-Romans gathered and settled there. They married Hungarian women and led them into their own Christian religion. … There was a smart and courageous man, Dragoș, among them. One day, he left with his companions for a hunt and they came across the footprints of a bison. Following it, they crossed the snowy mountains and arrived at a wonderful and even place where they spotted the bison. They killed it under a willow and feasted on it. Then God brought the idea to his mind that he should find a new homeland and settle there. … [T]hey returned home and spoke of the beauty of that country and of its rivers and springs to the other people so that to convince them to move there. The latter also liked the idea and decided to leave for the place where their companions were staying and to search for a new homeland. It was surrounded by deserted lands and the Tatars and their cattle roamed in the borderlands. Thereupon they asked Vladislav, the Hungarian king, to let them leave, and King Vladislav graciously assented. They left Maramureș, together with all their companions and with their wives and children, to cross the high mountains. Many trees were cut down and many cliffs were pushed aside, but they crossed the mountains and arrived at the place where Dragoș had killed the bison. They liked it and dismounted there. They chose an intelligent man named Dragoș of their number and appointed him to be their lord and voivode, and thus the country of Moldavia was founded by the will of God. —Moldo-Russian chronicle

=== Bogdan the Founder ===
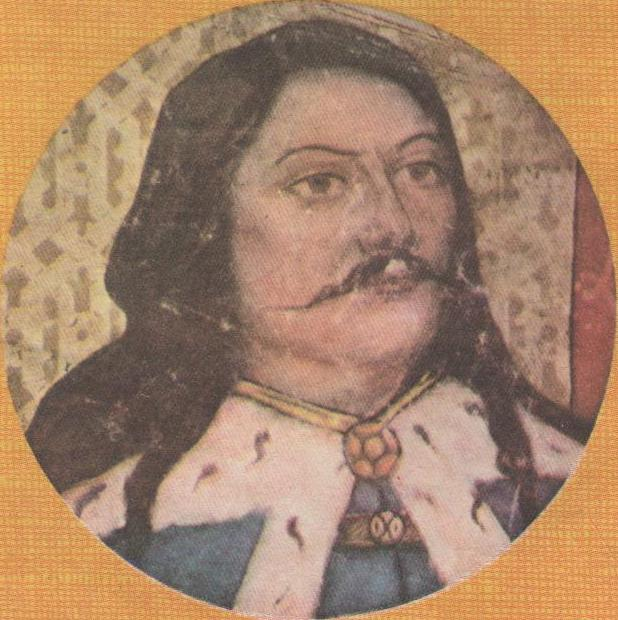
Impression of Bogdan I, the 15th-century founder of Moldavia, by Pierre Auguste Bellet (1865–1924)

Most early Moldavian chronicles begin their lists of the rulers of Moldavia with Dragoș and state that he was succeeded by his son, Sas, who ruled for four years. The only exception is the list of the voivodes, which was recorded in the Bistrița Monastery in 1407, which starts with "Bogdan Voivode". Bogdan, who had been the voivode of the Vlachs in Maramureș, gathered the Vlachs in that district and "secretly passed into Moldavia", according to John of Küküllő's chronicle. Royal charters recorded that Bogdan had come into a conflict with János Kölcsei, the royal castellan of Visk (now Vyshkovo in Ukraine), in 1343, and with a Vlach lord in Maramureș, Giula of Giulești, in 1349. According to historian Radu Carciumaru, Bogdan's conflict with the royal castellan suggests that he had been opposed to the presence of the representatives of royal authority in Maramureș years before he left for Moldavia.

The dating of Bogdan's departure from Maramureș is uncertain. His estates there were confiscated and granted to the son of Sas, Balc, according to a royal diploma issued on 2 February 1365. Consequently, Bogdan must have come to Moldavia before that date. Historian Pál Engel dates Bogdan's arrival to 1359, in order to take advantage of the power vacuum that followed the death of Berdi Beg, Khan of the Golden Horde. According to Carciumaru, a lasting conflict between King Louis I of Hungary and Charles IV, Holy Roman Emperor, and the Lithuanians' victory over the Tatars in the Battle of Blue Waters in the early 1360s, enabled Bogdan to come to Moldavia and expel Balc in 1363. Sălăgean says that it was only in 1365 that Bogdan seized power in Moldavia, with the assistance of local Vlachs.

King Louis I of Hungary attempted to restore his rule in Moldavia, but the chronology of the military actions against Bogdan is uncertain. John of Küküllő wrote that Bogdan "was often battled against" by the army of Louis, but the "number of Vlachs inhabiting that land increased, transforming it into a country". Although Küküllő stated that Bogdan was finally forced to accept Louis's suzerainty and to pay a yearly tribute to him, modern historians – including Denis Deletant, Tudor Sălăgean, Victor Spinei, and István Vásáry – agree that Bogdan could actually preserve the independence of Moldavia.

=== Successors to Bogdan ===
The new state derived its name from the Moldova River. In Latin and Slavic documents, it was mentioned as "Moldova", "Moldava" or "Moldavia". On the other hand, the Byzantines, who regarded it as a new Vlachia, referred to the country as Maurovlachia ("Black Vlachia"), Rusovlachia ("Vlachia near Russia") or Moldovlachia ("Moldavian Vlachia"). The Turkish name of Moldavia – Kara Boğdan – demonstrates Bogdan's preeminent role in the establishment of the principality.

==== Lațcu ====
Bogdan was succeeded by his son, Lațcu, around 1367. After Franciscan friars from Poland converted him to Catholicism, Lațcu initiated the establishment of a Roman Catholic diocese in Moldavia in 1370. His direct correspondence with the Holy See shows that he wanted to demonstrate the independence of Moldavia. Upon Lațcu's request, Pope Gregory XI set up the Roman Catholic Diocese of Siret in 1371, addressing his bull to "Lațcu, Duke of Moldavia". According to Sălăgean, the Holy See "consolidated the international status of Moldavia" by granting the title "duke" to Lațcu. On 14 March 1372, King Louis I of Hungary, who had also inherited Poland in 1370, signed a treaty with Emperor Charles IV who acknowledged Louis's rights in many lands, including Moldavia.

==== Petru Mușat ====
Lațcu, who died in 1375, was succeeded by Petru Mușat, according to the earliest lists of the rulers of Moldavia. However, the 15th-century Lithuanian-Ruthenian Chronicle wrote that the Vlachs elected George Koriatovich—who was a nephew of Algirdas, Grand Prince of Lithuania, and ruled in Podolia under Polish suzerainty—to be voivode, but later poisoned him. In late 1377, Vladislaus II of Opole, who administered Galicia in the name of King Louis I of Hungary, gave shelter to one "Vlach voivode", named George, who had fled to Galicia because of the "unexpected treason of his people". According to Spinei, George Koriatovich died in 1375, which excludes his identification with "Voivode George". Spinei also says that George Koriatovich most probably ruled in southeastern Moldavia which had been liberated from Mongol rule. The first Moldavian silver and bronze coins were minted for Petru Mușat in 1377.

According to a record in the register of the Genoese colony in Caffa on the Black See, two Genoese envoys were sent to "Constantino et Petro vayvoda" in 1386. Historians identified Voivode Constantino with Costea, whom the list of the voivodes of Moldavia, recorded in the Bistrița Monastery, mentioned between Lațcu and Peter. The record in the Caffa register suggests that the two voivodes—Costea and Petru Mușat—had the same position. The division of the medieval principality into two greater administrative units—Țara de Sus ("Upper Country") and Țara de Jos ("Lower Country")—each administered by a high official, the vornic, also implies the former existence of two polities, which were united by the Moldavian monarchs.

Petru Mușat paid homage to Władysław II Jagiełło, King of Poland, in Kraków on 26 September 1387. Upon Peter's request, Anton, the Orthodox Metropolitan of Halych, ordained two bishops for Moldova, one of them being Joseph Mușat, who was related to the voivode. However, the Ecumenical Patriarch of Constantinople refused to acknowledge their consecration. Petru Mușat expanded his authority as far as the Danube and the Black Sea. His successor, Roman I Mușat, styled himself "By the grace of God the Almighty, Voivode of Moldavia and her to the entire Vlach country from the mountains to the shores of the sea" on 30 March 1392. After years of negotiations, the Ecumenical Patriarch, Matthew I, acknowledged Joseph Mușat as Metropolitan of Maurovlachia in 1401.

=== Wallachia Minor ===
Some historians, such as Gheorghe Brătianu, Ștefan Purice, Aurelian Sacerdoțeanu and Dragoș Moldovanu, argue that the first major Romanian state in Moldavia was the voivodship at the border with Galicia in the Suceava area, which also included Țara Șipenițului. According to this concept, there are accounts from foreign sources of a Romanian state formed in this region, starting in the 13th century. The voivodship is attested to on several medieval maps as Wallachia Minor. When Italian chronicler, Thomas Tuscus, wrote that Ottokar II of Bohemia could not receive help in the battle against Rudolf I of Germany from the Ruthenians because they were in a military conflict with the Romanians at the border of the Principality of Galicia, it must have been a conflict against this voivodship. Over half a century later, in 1326, when Polish chronicler Ian Długosz wrote that the Romanians, with the Ruthenians and Lithuanians, participated in a Polish military campaign against the Margrave of Brandenburg, the Romanians must have been from the voivodship bordering Galicia. Although Moldavia was also referred to as Valahia Minor, these mentions are before the foundation of the principality of Moldavia. Wallachia Minor eventually merged with the Principality of Moldavia when Bogdan I married his son Lațcu with Anna of Siret who belonged to this local voievodal family.

== Growth of the principality ==
The Principality of Moldavia grew to include the territory between the Eastern Carpathians and the Dniester river. It existed until 1859, when it united with Wallachia as the basis of the modern Romanian state; at various times, the state included the regions of Bessarabia (with the Budjak) and all of Bukovina. The western half of Moldavia is now part of Romania, the eastern side belongs to the Republic of Moldova, while the northern and southeastern parts are territories of Ukraine.

== See also ==
- Founding of Wallachia
- History of Maramureș
- Balkan–Danubian culture
- Bulgarian lands across the Danube
