= Voivodeship of Maramureș =

Romanian medieval political entity

Voivodeship of Maramureș Voievodatul Maramureșului
- 1343–1402
- Voivode
  - 14th century, before 1343: Bogdan of Cuhea
  - 1365–1402: Balc of Moldavia
- Historical era: Middle Ages
  - Established: 1343
  - First mention: 21 October 1343
  - Redistribution of the Bogdănești estates to the Drăgoșești: 2 February 1365
  - Disestablished: 1402
Succeeded by
Máramaros County

The Voivodeship of Maramureș (Romanian: Voievodatul Maramureșului, or Maramureșul voievodal), was a Romanian voivodeship centered in the region of the same name within the Kingdom of Hungary. It was the most powerful and well-organized Romanian entity in the broader area of Transylvania during the 14th century. The Voivodeship of Maramureș was established in 1343. It was ultimately disestablished and supplanted with the Hungarian Máramaros County.

Internally, the voivodeship was essentially a confederation of autonomous kneziates - valley based political entities – each ruled by a local knez . The kneziates corresponded to clusters of villages in various river valleys - seven principal kneziates are recorded, including those of Bogdănești on the Iza/Vişeu, Mara, Câmpulung, Cosău, Bârjava, Talabor, and Varalia. Throughout its existence, the Voivodeship of Maramureș maintained a delicate relationship with the Kingdom of Hungary, oscillating between periods of near-complete territorial autonomy to direct overlordship under the various Hungarian kings.

== Background ==
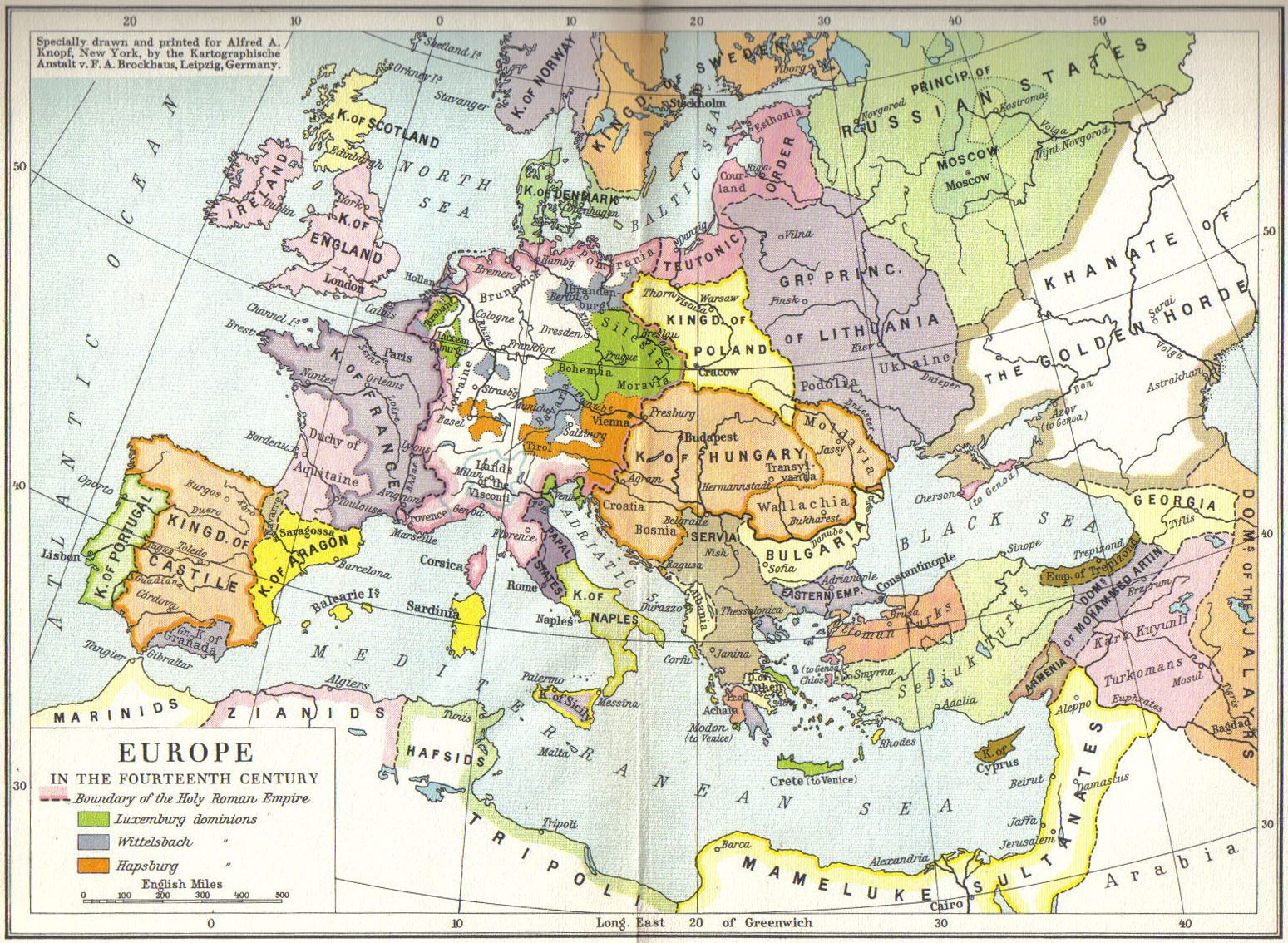
Europe in the 14th century

Maramureș, a mountainous region west of the Carpathian Mountains, had likely been included in the Kingdom of Hungary from an early date, even if only as part of the gyepű [hu], a sparsely populated no man's land, which could take multiple days of walking to cross, located behind the border fortifications themselves. Maramureș itself is mentioned in Hungarian documents for the first time in 1199, as a royal forest of King Emeric I. The area remained sparsely populated, not surpassing 8,000 inhabitants until the thirteenth century, after the Mongol Invasion and subsequent repopulation of Hungary.

The first settlements granted town privileges in the region were Visk, Huszt, Técső and Hosszúmező in 1329, followed by future regional capital Máramarossziget in 1352.

== Activities of the Bogdănești ==
The Vlachs were granted the right in the Vlach law to order themselves by their own tradition in cases where they were particularly populous, even voivodes to serve as regional leaders. While Vlach communities in the regions surrounding Maramureș also elected their own voivodes, it was only in Maramureș where they could translate their authority from cultural to territorial. They practiced their own faith and lived periphery of cities, but were important in the urban affairs. For military services, the king granted their knezes and voivodes possession over villages they have established. The knezes also fulfilled the job of organizing the settlement and handing over the tax. A diploma issued in 1485 by Queen Beatrice talking about a certain Vlach priest named Lawrence shows that the Romanians in Maramureș owed religious service to the Huszt castle. The Vlachs were particular in a sense that they lived in symbiosis with the arriving Rusyns.

The first document indicating that Vlachs crossed into Maramureș is from the 1320s. One group of nobles mentioned are brothers Dragoș and Drag who were granted Bedeu by king Charles I of Hungary, this Dragoș is most commonly associated with Dragoș I of Moldavia. Another group was led by Borzan. According to the Royal Charter dated 6 October 1335, in 1334, threatened by the Serbian expansion, an important Vlach group from the Balkans entered into Hungary under 9 months led by their voivode Bogdan (son of Mikola, claimed to be the same person as Bogdan of Cuhea) . Bogdan became Voivode of Maramureș and set his center near Iza, in the city of Konyha (today both part of Bogdan Vodă). One of the theories about Bogdan's early life suggest that he was a native noble that controlled a "valley knezate" centered around Konhya (Cuhea). This speculation about Bogdan's origin corresponds to the theory of continuous Vlach presence in the region and gradual evolution of its relations to the Hungarian Crown. On the other hand Romanian historians like Ștefan Olteanu, Radu Popa claim that the Hungarian Crown recognised the authority of local Vlach nobles following the enforcement of its authority around the end of the 13th century over Maramureș, a region that was previously less firmly under its control. After the death of King Charles I of Hungary, he became disloyal to the Hungarian king and was mentioned in a 1343 diploma as "former Voivode of Maramureș who became unfaithful to the king" Bogdan entered conflicts with Crăciun of Bilke around the time of the loss of his voivode title and, notably, with the loyalist Giulești family, whom he and his nephew Stephen attempted to expel from their estates in 1349, prompting King Louis I to request the Giulești's reinstatement from Stephen's brother Ioan (John), who had succeeded the family of Codrea of Hosszúmező as voivode. We also know about conflicts with the non-Romanian population along the Maros river. In 1353, Bogdan's estate was split between him and his nephews. Around this time, a number of Maramureș Romanians contributed to the Hungarian expeditions against the Golden Horde, culminating the naming of one Dragoș as head of the newly established March of Moldavia. Maramureș and Moldavia were closely linked in the latter's first years, with Dragoș of Giulești leading an expedition to pacify Romanian unrest around 1360. After the death of Sas of Moldavia, Bogdan seized this opportunity to secretly cross the Carpathians in 1359 and evict Sas' son, Balc from Moldavia, with or without the knowledge of his nephew and former collaborator Stephen, now voivode in Maramureș. The reasons for his exodus are not precisely known, but the disgrace he had suffered from the king's hand by the loss of his title must have contributed. He settled in Moldavia with his people, becoming Bogdan I of Moldavia, the first independent ruler of the country.

== Maramureș under the Drăgoșești ==
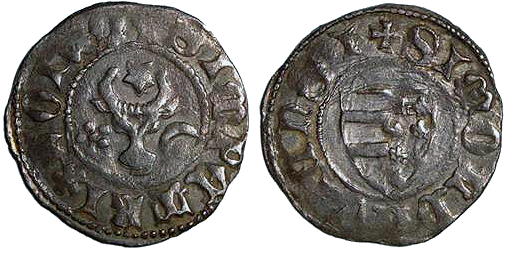
Contemporaneous coins of Peter II (or I), Voivode of Moldavia. The left one depicts the Moldavian bull's head, and the right one the coat-of-arms of the Kingdom of Hungary, signifying vassalage towards the Hungarian king. The Romanians in Maramureș took an important part in the founding of Moldavia

Balc, having suffered heavy losses to his family and retinue, as well as grave injuries to himself, started a migration into Máramaros, where King Louis I granted him and his brother Drag the confiscated estates of Bogdan and the Voivodeship of Maramureș, title of which the Bogdănești had been deprived, on 2 February 1365. Throughout the following years, the so far uninhabited northern mountains of Transylvania were speedily repopulated with Romanian commoners. The Maramureș forces contributed to Hungarian campaigns in Bulgaria and Halych, netting the voivodes considerable favor with the crown. Following this, the brothers were granted a number of titles. By 1388, they were Counts of the Székelys, Ugocsa, Szatmár and Máramaros. The Hungarian Kings intended for this to be a way of eroding the autonomy of their Kingdom's outer reaches by having authority come from the county granted by the king, rather than the elevated local ruler. In Maramureș, this period is marked by the development of large villages in the region, as the voivodes centralised their holdings, Balc and Drag coming to directly administer over 30 settlements in the region. By 1391, the two brothers had built a church at Peri, for which they requested and received the status of Stauropegion, as they were of the Eastern Orthodox tradition of Christianity, rather than Roman Catholic like the near-entirety of the Hungarian nobility at the time. Such endeavours have been viewed as attempts to establish a nucleus for a new, larger voivodeship, similar in status to the neighbouring Transylvania.

In the second half of the 14th century, multiple settlements inhabited mostly by Romanians were recorded. In 1345, Szarvaszó (Sarasău) was ruled by Aprusa and Marus. Julius, son of Dragoș held Gyulafalva from before 1349. In 1360, Peter's son Stan inherited Felsőróna (Rona de Sus), interestingly not as a keneziate, but by noble right. In 1363, Fejéregyház was gained by Balc, Drag and John. According to a diploma of King Sigismund issued in 1407, Felsőapsa (Верхнє Водяне, Apşa de Sus), Középapsa (Середнє Водяне, Apşa de Mijloc) and Alsóapsa (Нижня Апша, Apşa de Jos) was gained by the Vlachs during the reign of King Louis I.

== Downfall ==
Drag died around the end of the year 1400. At the same time, unrest was brewing among the Hungarian nobility against King Sigismund of Luxembourg, who remained King of Hungary in spite of the death of his wife, Mary, in 1395, which was closely followed by a military defeat against the Ottomans at Nikopol the following year. By the time of his return in 1401, the nobility, led by his chancellor, John Kanizsai, Archbishop of Esztergom, was prepared to depose him. It seems that Balc took their side in this endeavour, as multiple complaints were leveled against his family after the King's eventual defeat of the plotters. Balc had predeceased these developments, as he is first referred to as "the late Master Balk" in a document from June 25 1402. This fatal blow to the voivodal polity may have occurred violently, in connection to the battles in the spring of 1402, or not, as Balc was of advanced age, having been the older of the two brothers. Whichever the case, no new voivode for all of Maramureș seems to have been chosen, as his descendants were left with a small estate in Szatmár County.

== Legacy ==
The title of voivode would never regain the importance it had before 1402, being restricted to smaller areas in an increasingly ethnically diverse region, as former knezes reclaimed their domains during an influx of southwards Ruthenian movement. Throughout the 15th century, a number of Vlach noble families converted to Catholicism and adopted Hungarian customs. Among them was an offshoot of the Drăgoșesti, headed by a son of Drag, which would eventually become the Drágffy of Béltek family, a member of which would eventually hold the dignity of Voivode of Transylvania. These developments paved the way for the complete dissolution of Vlach rights in Hungary after the Peasant Revolt in Transylvania and their exclusion from the region's administration, as the Saxon, Hungarian and Székely nobility formed the Unio Trium Nationum. In Moldavia, the element from Maramureș was quickly overwhelmed, however, the Aurochs' head, considered by some to have been brought into Moldavia from Maramureș remained its symbol.

== See also ==
- History of Maramureș
- Máramaros County
- Maramureș
- Northern Maramureș
- Maramureș County
