= Misail the Monk =

17th-century Moldavian chronicler

Misail the Monk (Romanian: Misail Călugărul (fl. 17th century) was a Moldavian monk, copyist, and chronicler.

Misail updated Grigore Ureche's Letopisețul Țării Moldovei (Chronicles of the Land of Moldavia) in a number of places.
