= Bogdan the Founder =

First independent ruler of Moldavia in the 1360s

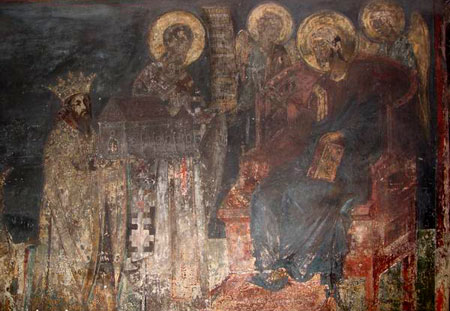
- Bogdan I (on the far left) in a mural at Bogdana Monastery

Voivode of Moldavia
- Reign: 1359/1365 – 1365/1367
- Predecessor: Sas
- Successor: Lațcu
- Died: 1365/1367
- Burial: Rădăuți
- Issue: Ștefan; Lațcu
- Father: Mikola (debated)

Bogdan I, commonly known as Bogdan the Founder (Romanian: Bogdan Întemeietorul), was the first independent ruler, or voivode, of Moldavia in the 1360s. He had initially been the voivode, or head, of the Vlachs in the Voivodeship of Maramureș in the Kingdom of Hungary. However, when the first certain record was made of him in 1343, he was mentioned as a former voivode who had become disloyal to Louis I of Hungary. He invaded the domains of a Vlach landowner who remained loyal to the king in 1349. Four years later, he was again mentioned as voivode in a charter, which was the last record of his presence in Maramureș.

Bogdan and his retainers left Maramureș for Moldavia between 1359 and 1365. Moldavia had been under the rule of Sas of Moldavia, a vassal of Louis I of Hungary, but the local Bulgarians were opposed to the Hungarian suzerainty. Bogdan expelled Sas's son, Balc, by force and seized the throne. In retaliation, Louis I confiscated Bogdan's estates in Maramureș in 1365. Bogdan reigned as the first voivode of Moldavia. He did not accept the overlordship of Louis I of Hungary, transforming Moldavia into the second independent Romanian principality.

== Origins ==
Bogdan's early life is subject to scholarly debate According to a theory, Bogdan was descended from a Vlach family, native to Maramureș. His ancestral estates formed a "valley knezate" with its center in Cuhea. According to a concurrent theory, Bogdan was identical with one Voivode Bogdan, son of Mikola. A royal charter, dated to 6 October 1335, narrated that Charles I of Hungary had sent Ladislaus Jánki, Archbishop of Kalocsa, to Clisura Dunării three times in 1334 and 1335 to make preparations for the movement of Bogdan, son of Mikola, from "his country" to the Kingdom of Hungary. Historian Pál Engel says that Voivode Bogdan led a large group of Vlachs from Serbia to Hungary on this occasion. The royal charter neither referred to Bogdan's ethnicity, nor mentioned large groups of Vlachs. However, the use of titles such as "vojvoda" and "knez", along with the name Bogdan, suggests a Slavic rather than Aromanian composition within that group. Historian Victor Spinei emphasizes that the "similitude of the names is insufficient to identify" Bogdan, son of Mikola, with Bogdan, the future voivode of Moldavia.

At Cuhea, the ruins of a church and a manor house were unearthed. The church was dedicated to King St Stephen. Besides its dedication, the presence of a sacristy to the north of the altar shows that it was a Roman Catholic church, suggesting that either Bogdan's family converted to Catholicism or an originally Catholic church building was transformed to serve an Orthodox family. The oldest parts of the manor house were built in the late 13th century, but it was enlarged in the middle of the next century.

Bogdan's domain in Maramureș was described in a royal charter, issued on 2 February 1365. It listed Ieud, Bachkow, two Vișeus (now Vișeu de Jos and Vișeu de Sus), Moisei, Borșa and Keethzeleste among Bogdan's villages. The list shows that Bogdan's domain was situated along the upper courses of the rivers Iza and Vișeu.

== Conflicts in Maramureș ==
When Charles I's son, Louis I of Hungary, ascended the throne in July 1342, Bogdan had already been the voivode of the Voivodeship of Maramureș. At that time, the Vlach knezes, or chiefs, of Maramureș elected their voivodes from among their number. Louis I's charter, dated to 21 October 1343, referred to Bogdan as "former voivode of Maramureș, disloyal to us", showing that Bogdan had come into conflict with the king or the king's representatives and lost his office. The document referred to a debate between Bogdan and János Kölcsei, the royal castellan of Visk (now Vyshkovo in Ukraine), but the causes and exact circumstances of the debate are unknown. According to historians Radu Carciumaru and Victor Spinei, Louis I's attempts to limit the voivodes' privileges caused the conflict. Spinei writes that the king exploited the conflicts between the leading Vlach families to depose Bogdan with the assistance of local knezes, thus hindering him from rising up in open rebellion. On the other hand, Ioan-Aurel Pop says that Bogdan staged a rebellion against the sovereign which lasted for years.

After his deposition, Bogdan did not leave Maramureș. King Louis mentioned Bogdan as "an inveterate disloyal subject of ours" in a royal charter, issued on 15 September 1349, suggesting that Bogdan's relations with the king had worsened between 1343 and 1349. According to the document, Bogdan attempted to persuade a Vlach knez, Giula of Giuleşti, and his six sons to join him. For the Giuleştis refused him, Bogdan and his nephew, Stephen, invaded their domains in Maramureș and expelled them from there. King Louis ordered John, voivode of Maramureș (who was Stephen's brother and Bogdan's nephew) to restore the Giuleştis in their estates at an assembly of the knezes in the presence of Andrew Lackfi, ispán, or head, of Maramureș County.

The presence of Bogdan in Maramureș was last documented on 14 May 1353. On this day, the Eger Chapter determined the boundaries of the domain of Bogdan's two nephews, Stephen and John, in Cuhea. The document mentioned both Stephen and John as the king's "loyal servants" and referred to their uncle as "Voivode Bogdan", without mentioning his disloyalty. Bogdan must have been present, because the boundaries of his nephews' estates were fixed in the presence of the neighboring landowners, including Bogdan, according to the document.

== Voivode of Moldavia ==
The biographer of Louis I of Hungary, John of Küküllő recorded that "Bogdan, the voivode of the Romanians of Maramureș, gathering the Romanians from this district, secretly passed into Moldavia, which was subject to the Hungarian Crown, but had been abandoned by its inhabitants because of the vicinity of the Tatars." Moldavia had been a defensive march of the Kingdom of Hungary. According to the earliest Moldavian chronicles, it came into being when a Vlach lord, Dragoș, and his people left Maramureș and settled on the banks of the Moldova River in the late 1340s or the 1350s. Both Dragoș and his successor, Sas, accepted Louis I's suzerainty.

No contemporaneous sources mentioned the reasons of Bogdan's movement to Moldavia. According to Tudor Sălăgean, Bogdan left Maramureș because he "failed to get rid of the Hungarian hegemony". Victor Spinei writes that Dragoș's example encouraged Bogdan to cross the Carpathian Mountains, especially because he knew that the Vlachs in Moldavia were opposed to Louis I's authority. A diploma of King Louis, issued on 20 March 1360, mentioned that the Vlachs rose up in open rebellion in Moldavia, but Dragoș of Giulești – one of the six sons of Bogdan's former opponent, Giula of Giulești – defeated them, restoring the king's rule in Moldavia.

According to a royal charter, dated to 2 February 1365, Bogdan and his (unnamed) sons had "stealthily" fled from Hungary because they wanted to seize Moldavia. Balc, the son of Sas of Moldavia, tried to resist them, but Bogdan and his sons forced him to withdraw to Hungary. In retaliation, Louis I of Hungary confiscated Bogdan's domain in Maramureș and donated it to Balc and his brothers. Bogdan seized the province after Balc left for Hungary.

Bogdan's action took place before 2 February 1365, but the exact date is debated. The earliest year, proposed by historians, is 1359; historians suggesting this date say that Bogdan took advantage of the local Vlachs' rebellion, documented by the 1360 royal diploma. Dennis Deletant writes that Bogdan invaded Moldavia around 1363. Radu Carciumaru proposes the same year; he says that Bogdan took advantage both of a conflict between Louis I of Hungary and Charles IV, Holy Roman Emperor and of the decisive victory of the Lithuanians over the Tatars in the Battle of Blue Waters. Bogdan's action took place in 1364, according to Victor Spinei, and only in 1365, according to Tudor Sălăgean.

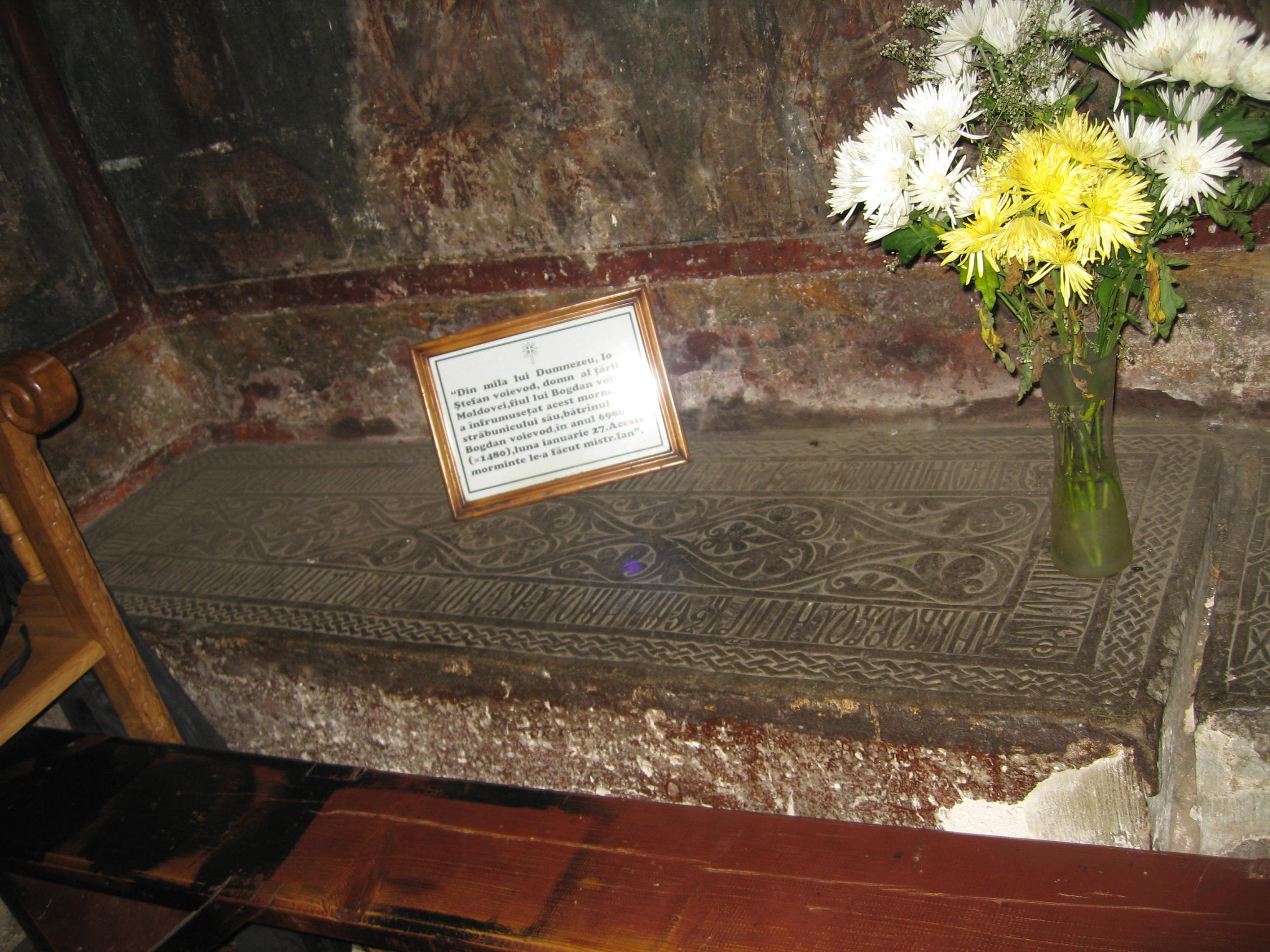
Grave of Bogdan at Bogdana Monastery, Rădăuţi

John of Küküllő mentioned that Louis I's army often invaded Moldavia, but the "number of Vlachs inhabiting that land increased, transforming it into a country". John of Küküllő even wrote that Louis I fought most frequently against Moldavia and Serbia during his reign. However, the king's itinerary, reconstructed based on his charters, suggests that he could only take part in military actions against Moldavia in 1366, 1368 and 1370. John of Küküllő stated that the king's suzerainty had been restored in Moldavia. According to Spinei, Louis I could only force Bogdan's son, Laţcu, to yield to him after Louis became King of Poland in 1370.

The boundaries of Moldavia during Bogdan's reign cannot exactly be determined. According to historian Laurenţiu Rădvan, his realm included the northwestern regions between the Carpathian Mountains and the Dniester River, maybe as far as the Cheremosh River. Bogdan's seat was at Siret where a royal residence had been built during Dragoș's reign, according to the Moldavian chronicles. He died in 1365 or 1367. He was buried in the Saint Nicholas Monastery at Rădăuţi. Bogdan was succeeded by his son, Laţcu.

== Legacy ==
The foundation of the independent Principality of Moldavia – the second independent Romanian state after the Principality of Wallachia – is attributed to Bogdan by modern historians. The list of the voivodes of Moldavia, recorded in the Bistrița Monastery in 1407, begins with Bogdan, without referring to his predecessors, Dragoș and Sas, who were mentioned in all Moldavian chronicles. In Turkic documents, Moldavia was mentioned as "Kara-Boğdan", or "Black Bogdan", from the late 14th century onward, which also shows his fame.

== See also ==
- House of Bogdan-Mușat
- Bogdana Monastery

== Sources ==
- Andreescu, Stefan (1998). "The making of the Romanian principalities". In Giurescu, Dinu C.; Fischer-Galați, Stephen (eds.). Romania: A Historic Perspective. East European Monographs. pp. 77–104. OCLC 237138831.
- Brezianu, Andrei; Spânu, Vlad (2007). Historical Dictionary of Moldova. Scarecrow Press, Inc. ISBN 978-0-8108-5607-3.
- Engel, Pál (1996). Magyarország világi archontológiája, 1301–1457, I. [Secular Archontology of Hungary, 1301–1457, Volume I]. História, MTA Történettudományi Intézete. ISBN 963-8312-44-0.
- Carciumaru, Radu (2012). "The Genesis of the Medieval State on the Romanian Territory: Moldavia". Studia Slavica et Balcanica Petropolitana. 2 (12): 172–188.
- Crăciun, Maria (2005). "Apud ecclesia: church burial and the development of funerary rooms in Moldavia". In Coster, Will; Spicer, Andrew (eds.). Sacred Space in Early Medieval Europe. Cambridge University Press. pp. 144–166. ISBN 978-0-521-82487-3.
- Deletant, Dennis (1986). "Moldavia between Hungary and Poland, 1347-1412". The Slavonic and East European Review. 64 (2): 189–211.
- Engel, Pál (2001). The Realm of St Stephen: A History of Medieval Hungary, 895–1526. I.B. Tauris Publishers. ISBN 1-86064-061-3.
- Georgescu, Vlad (1991). The Romanians: A History. Ohio State University Press. ISBN 0-8142-0511-9.
- Györffy, György (1998). Az Árpád-kori Magyarország történeti földrajza, IV: Liptó, Máramaros, Moson, Nagysziget, Nógrád, Nyitra, Pest és Pilis megye [Historical Geography of Hungary during the Age of the Árpáds, Volume IV: Counties of Liptó, Máramaros, Moson, Nagysziget, Nógrád, Nyitra, Pest és Pilis]. Akadémiai Kiadó. ISBN 963-05-7504-3.
- Pop, Ioan-Aurel (2005). "Transylvania in the 14th century and the first half of the 15th century (1300-1456)". In Pop, Ioan-Aurel; Nägler, Thomas (eds.). The History of Transylvania, Vol. I. (Until 1541). Romanian Cultural Institute (Center for Transylvanian Studies). pp. 247–298. ISBN 973-7784-00-6.
- Pop, Ioan-Aurel (2013). "De manibus Valachorum scismaticorum...": Romanians and Power in the Mediaeval Kingdom of Hungary: The Thirteenth and Fourteenth Centuries. Peter Lang Edition. ISBN 978-3-631-64866-7.
- Rădvan, Laurenţiu (2010). At Europe's Borders: Medieval Towns in the Romanian Principalities. BRILL. ISBN 978-90-04-18010-9.
- Sălăgean, Tudor (2005). "Romanian Society in the Early Middle Ages (9th–14th Centuries AD)". In Pop, Ioan-Aurel; Bolovan, Ioan (eds.). History of Romania: Compendium. Romanian Cultural Institute (Center for Transylvanian Studies). pp. 133–207. ISBN 978-973-7784-12-4.
- Spinei, Victor (1986). Moldavia in the 11th–14th Centuries. Editura Academiei Republicii Socialiste Româna.
- Treptow, Kurt W.; Popa, Marcel (1996). Historical Dictionary of Romania. Scarecrow Press, Inc. ISBN 0-8108-3179-1.
- Vásáry, István (2005). Cumans and Tatars: Oriental Military in the Pre-Ottoman Balkans, 1185–1365. Cambridge University Press. ISBN 0-521-83756-1.

Bogdan the Founder House of Bogdan-Mușat Died: 1365-1367
Regnal titles
Preceded by Sas	Voivode of Moldavia; 1359–1365 – 1365–1367	Succeeded by Petru I
