= Burla, Suceava =

Burla
- Commune
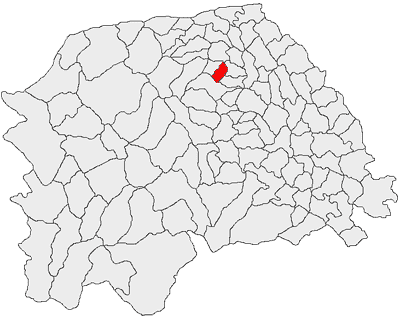
- Location in Suceava County

- Location in Romania
- Coordinates: 47°50′33″N 25°55′9″E
- Country: Romania
- County: Suceava

Government
  - Mayor (2024–2028): Viorel Pintiliuc (PNL)
- Area: 19.7 km^{2} (7.6 sq mi)
- Elevation: 432 m (1,417 ft)
- Population (2021-12-01): 2,135
  - Density: 110/km^{2} (280/sq mi)
- Time zone: EET/EEST (UTC+2/+3)
- Postal code: 727616
- Area code: (+40) x30
- Vehicle reg.: SV

Burla is a commune located in Suceava County, Romania. It is composed of a single village, Burla, part of Volovăț Commune until 2004, when it was split off.
