= Bedevlia =

Bedevlia Бедевля Bedőháza (in Hungarian) Bedeu (in Romanian) בידעוולא (in Yiddish)
- Village
- Interactive map of Bedevlia
- Location within Zakarpattia Oblast Location within Ukraine
- Coordinates: 48°00′14″N 23°39′51″E
- Country: Ukraine
- Oblast: Zakarpattia Oblast
- Raion: Tiachiv Raion
- Hromada: Bedevlia rural hromada

Population (2001)
  - Total: 3,971

Bedevlia (Ukrainian: Бедевля or Bedevlya, Hungarian: Bedőháza, Yiddish: בידעוולא or Bedevle, Romanian: Bedeu) is a village in Zakarpattia Oblast (province) of western Ukraine. As of 2001, its population was 3,971, in 2026 it was ▼3,939 people.

== Geography ==
The village is located around 7 km south of Tiachiv. Administratively, the village belongs to the Tiachiv Raion, Zakarpattia Oblast.

== History ==
Bedevlia was first mentioned in 1336 by the name of Bedeuhaza.

In 1336, Charles I of Hungary donated possession of the land boundary of Bedeuhaza to his royal servants the brothers Drag and Dragoş, the diploma refers to them as "servants of the king".

Bedőháza belonged to Máramaros County until the Treaty of Trianon of 1920.

== Population ==
According to the official census of 2001, the population included 5423 inhabitants.

== Gallery ==
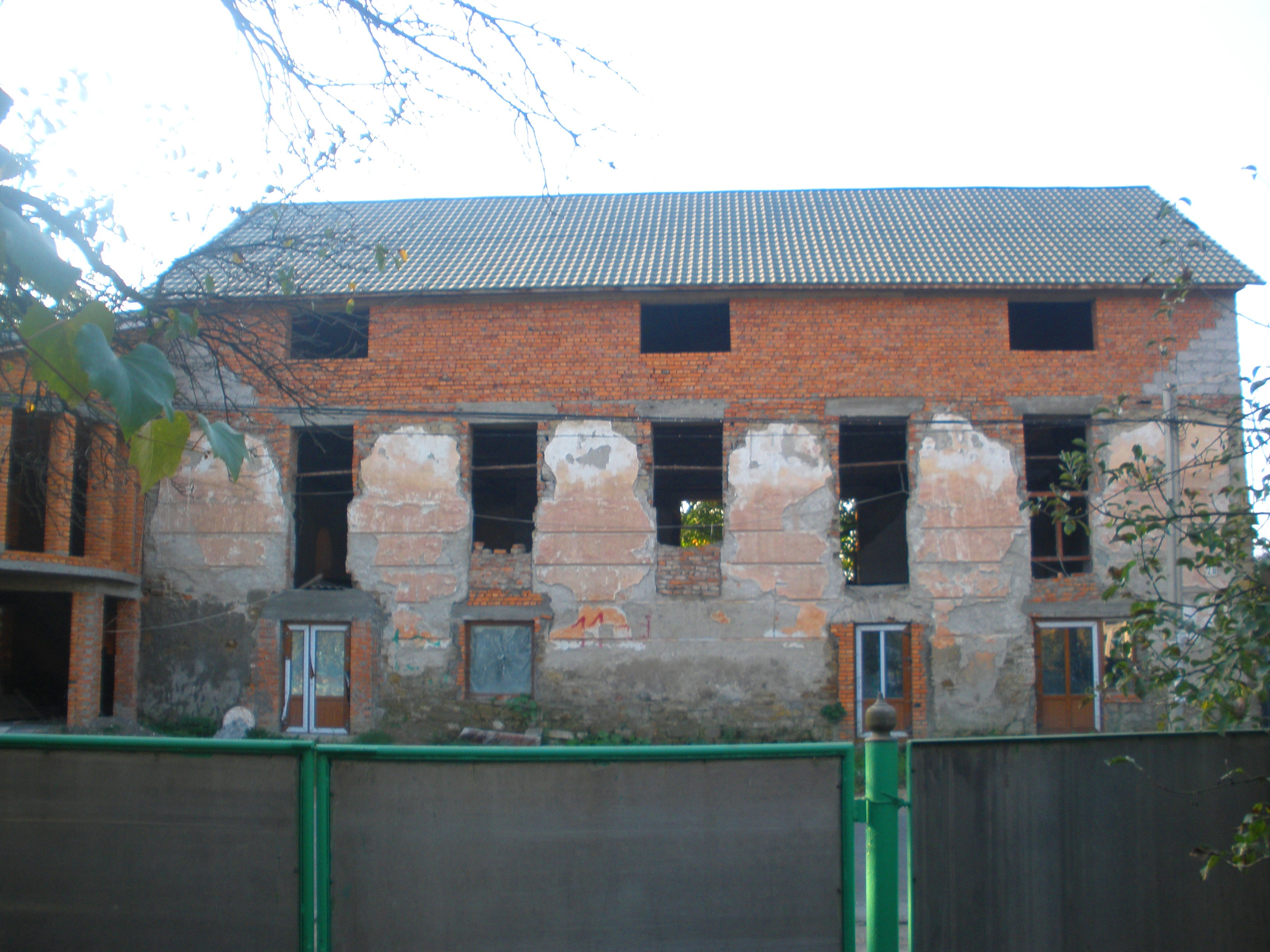
Former synagogue

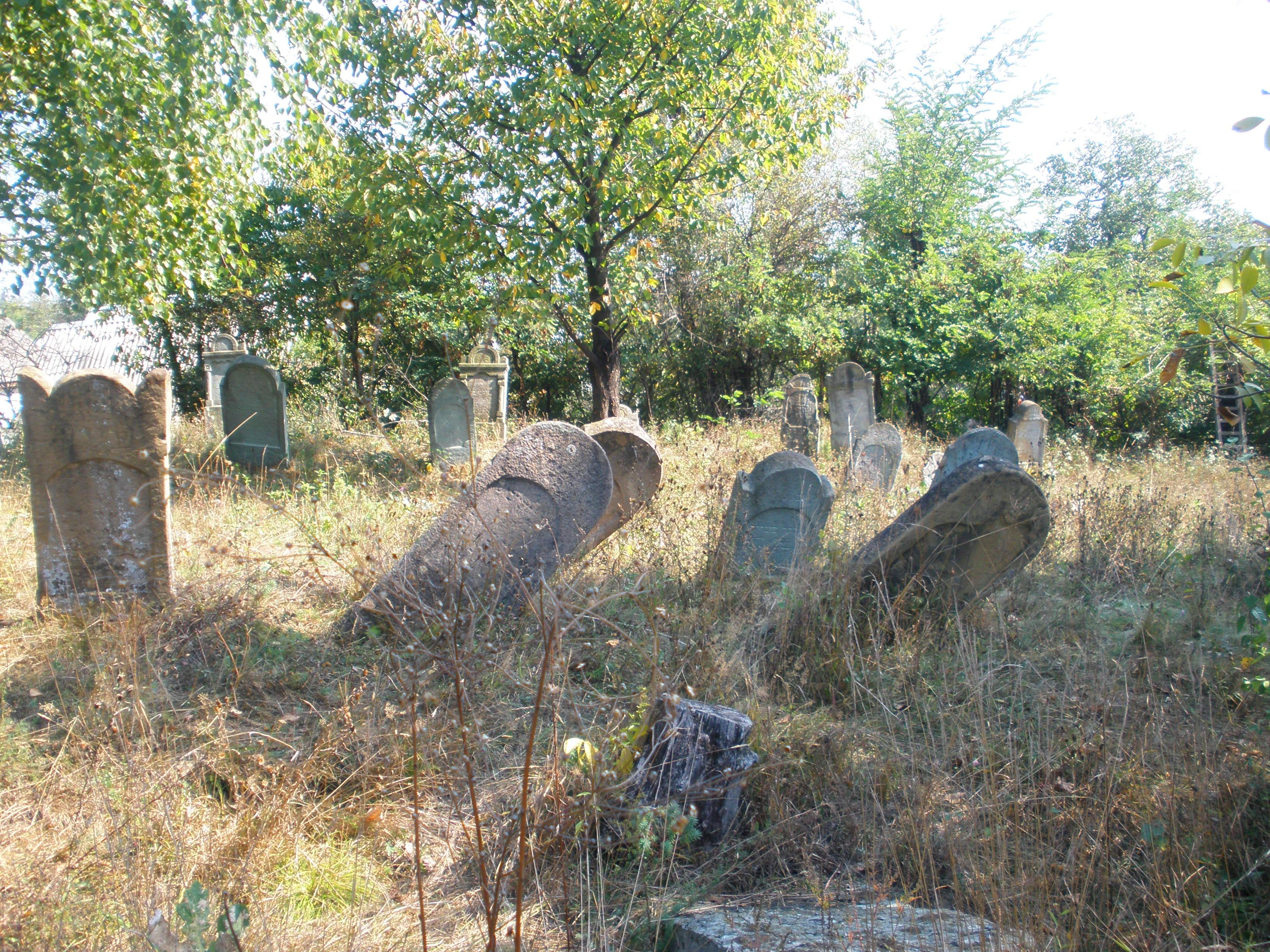
Jewish cemetery in Bedevlia
