= Volovăț =

- Commune
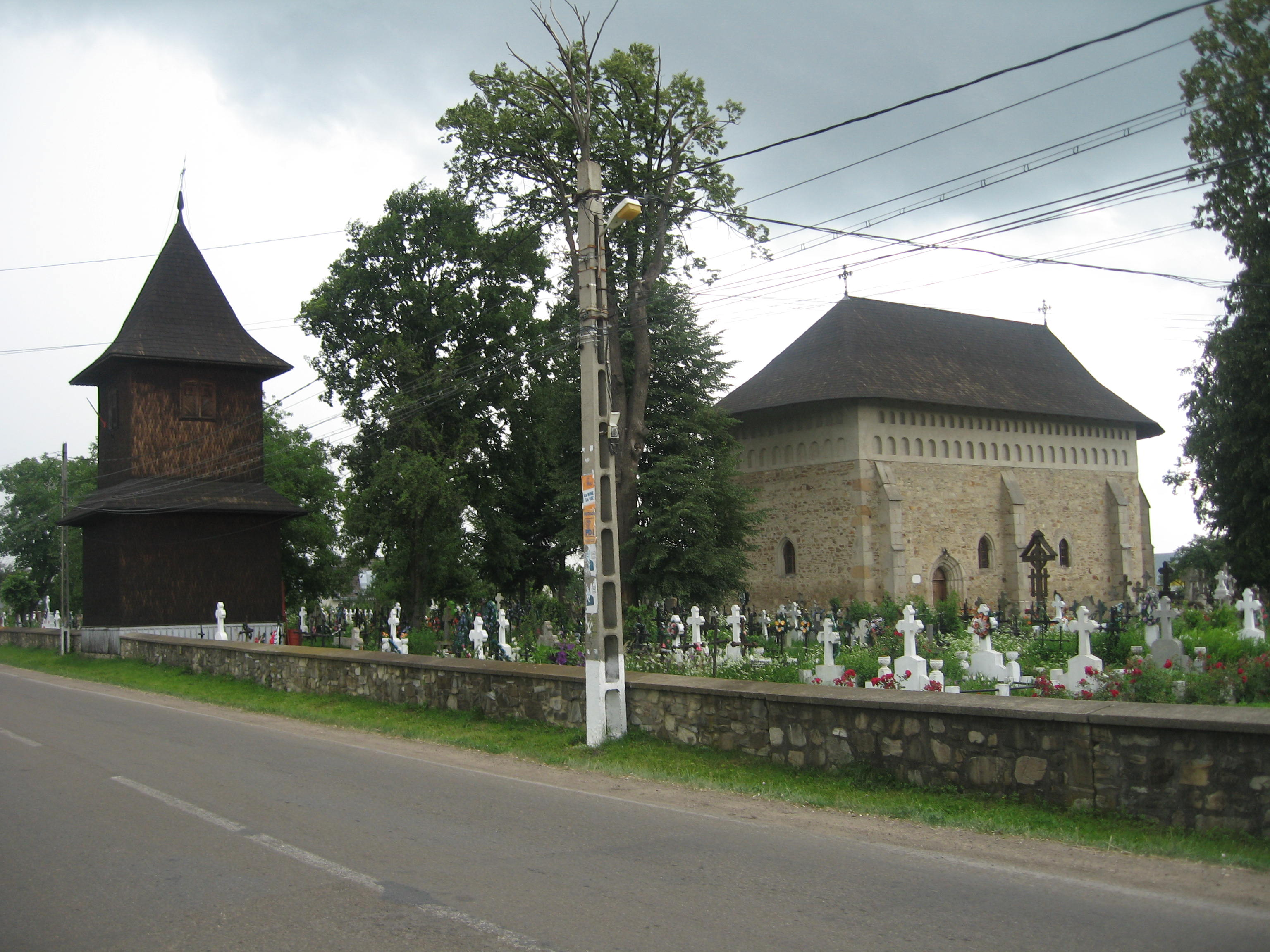
- Orthodox church with wooden tower in Volovăț

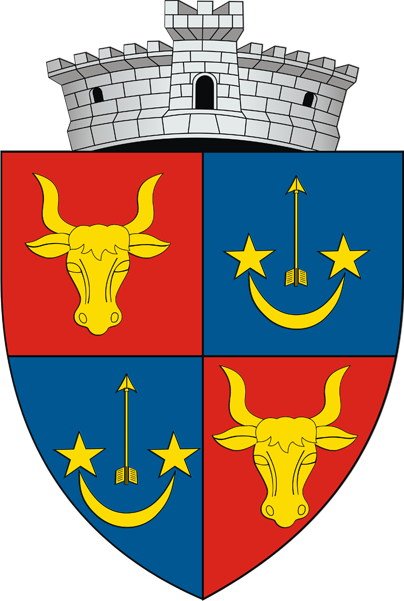
- Coat of arms

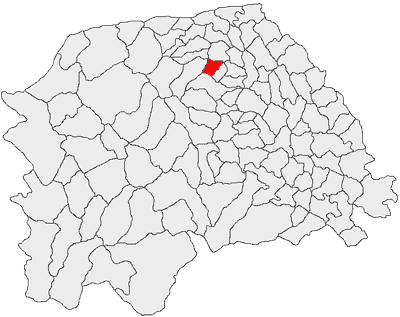
- Location in Suceava County

- Location in Romania
- Coordinates: 47°49′N 25°54′E
- Country: Romania
- County: Suceava
- Area: 22 km^{2} (8.5 sq mi)
- Elevation: 401 m (1,316 ft)
- Population (2021-12-01): 6,106
  - Density: 280/km^{2} (720/sq mi)
- Time zone: UTC+02:00 (EET)
  - Summer (DST): UTC+03:00 (EEST)
- Postal code: 727615
- Area code: +40 230
- Vehicle reg.: SV
- Website: www.comunavolovat.ro

Volovăț (German: Wollowetz) is a commune located in Suceava County, in the historical region of Bukovina, northeastern Romania. It is composed of a single village, namely Volovăț, and also included the village of Burla until 2004, when it was split off to form a separate commune.

== Demographics ==
Historical population
Year	Pop.	±%
2002	4,858	—
2011	4,952	+1.9%
2021	6,106	+23.3%
Source: Census data

At the 2011 census, the commune had 4,952 inhabitants, of which 98.7% were Romanians and 1% Roma; 54.8% were Romanian Orthodox and 44.8% Pentecostal. At the 2021 census, the population of Volovăț had increased to 6,106, of which 92.71% were Romanians and 1.44% Roma.
