= Baia =

- Commune
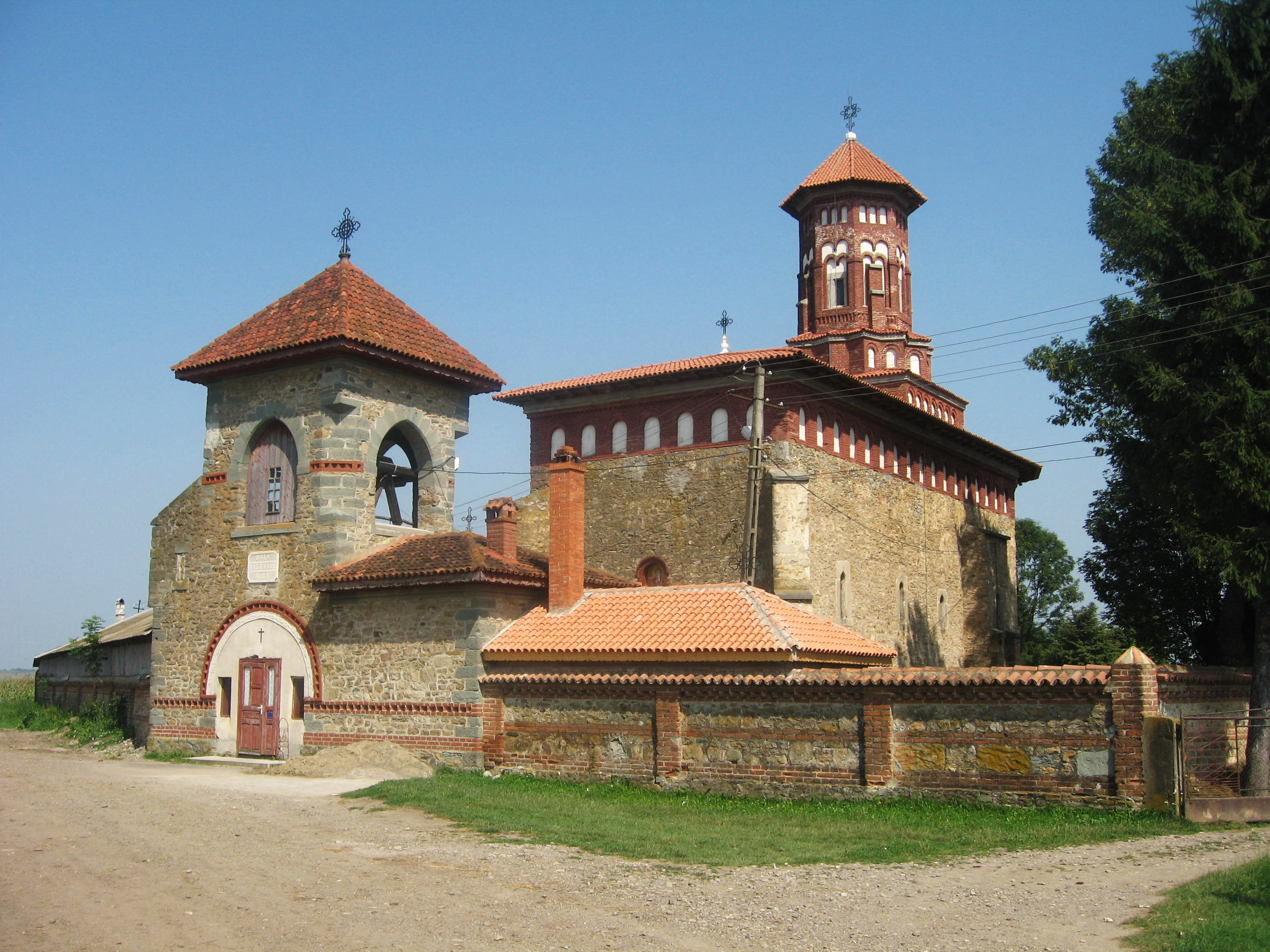
- The White Church (Romanian: Biserica albă) in Baia

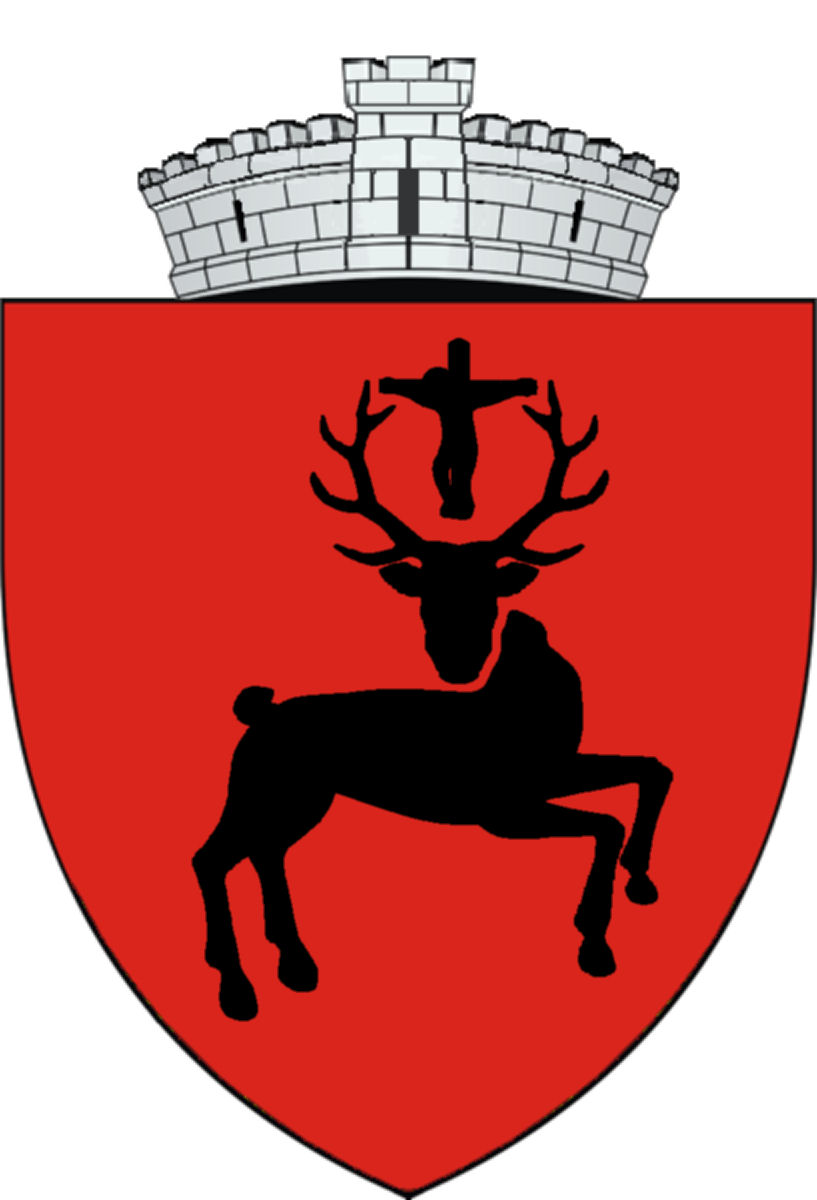
- Coat of arms

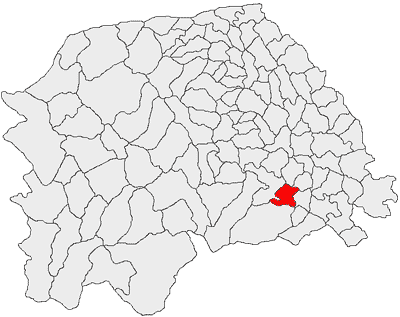
- Location in Suceava County

- Location in Romania
- Coordinates: 47.4203°N 26.2169°E
- Country: Romania
- County: Suceava

Government
  - Mayor (2024–2028): Maria Tomescu (PSD)
- Area: 39 km^{2} (15 sq mi)
- Elevation: 345 m (1,132 ft)
- Population (2021-12-01): 7,261
  - Density: 190/km^{2} (480/sq mi)
- Time zone: UTC+02:00 (EET)
  - Summer (DST): UTC+03:00 (EEST)
- Postal code: 727020
- Area code: (+40) 0230
- Vehicle reg.: SV
- Website: www.comunabaia.ro

Baia (German: Baja, Stadt Molde, or Moldenmarkt; Hungarian: Moldvabánya; Latin: Civitas Moldaviae) is a commune in Suceava County, in the historical region of Western Moldavia, northeastern Romania with a population of 7,261 as of 2021. It is composed of two villages, namely Baia and Bogata. Located on the Moldova River, it was one of the earliest urban settlements in Moldavia.

== Name ==
The Romanian baia and Hungarian bánya both mean "mine". Archeologists found traces of iron slag and coal, but only for a brief period before 14th century, before the arrival of the colonists. It is possible that it derives from the term Bania (from Ban, a political leader). Baia was mentioned for the first time in the Nestor chronicle under the name Bania.

Another name of the settlement was Târgul Moldovei which means "the market of Moldavia", referring to the Moldova River. Its Hungarian name was Moldvabánya, "the Moldova mine". It also had a Latin name, Civitas Moldaviae which was found on an early seal of the city.

== History ==
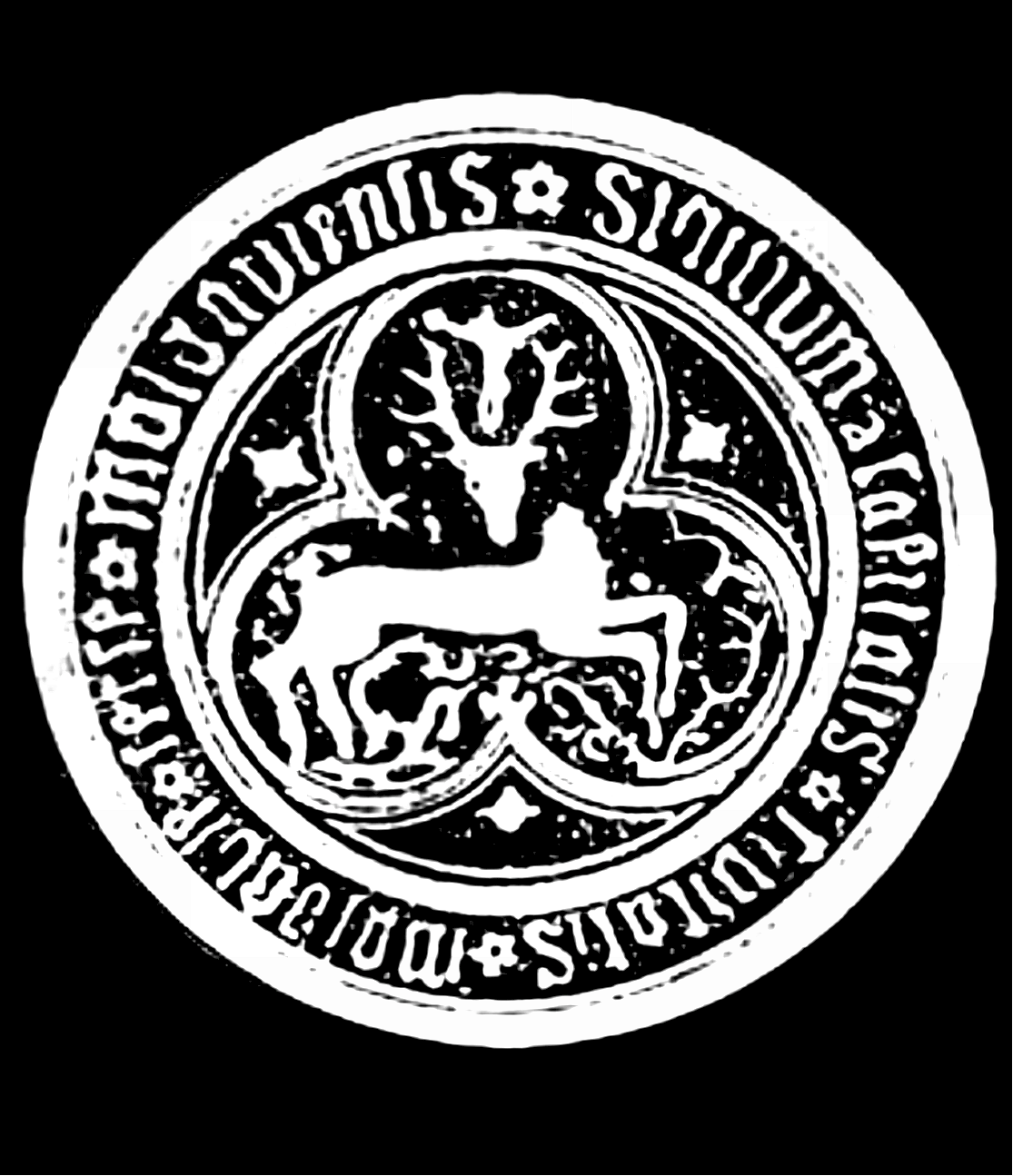
14th century seal from Baia, evoking the legend of Saint Hubertus.

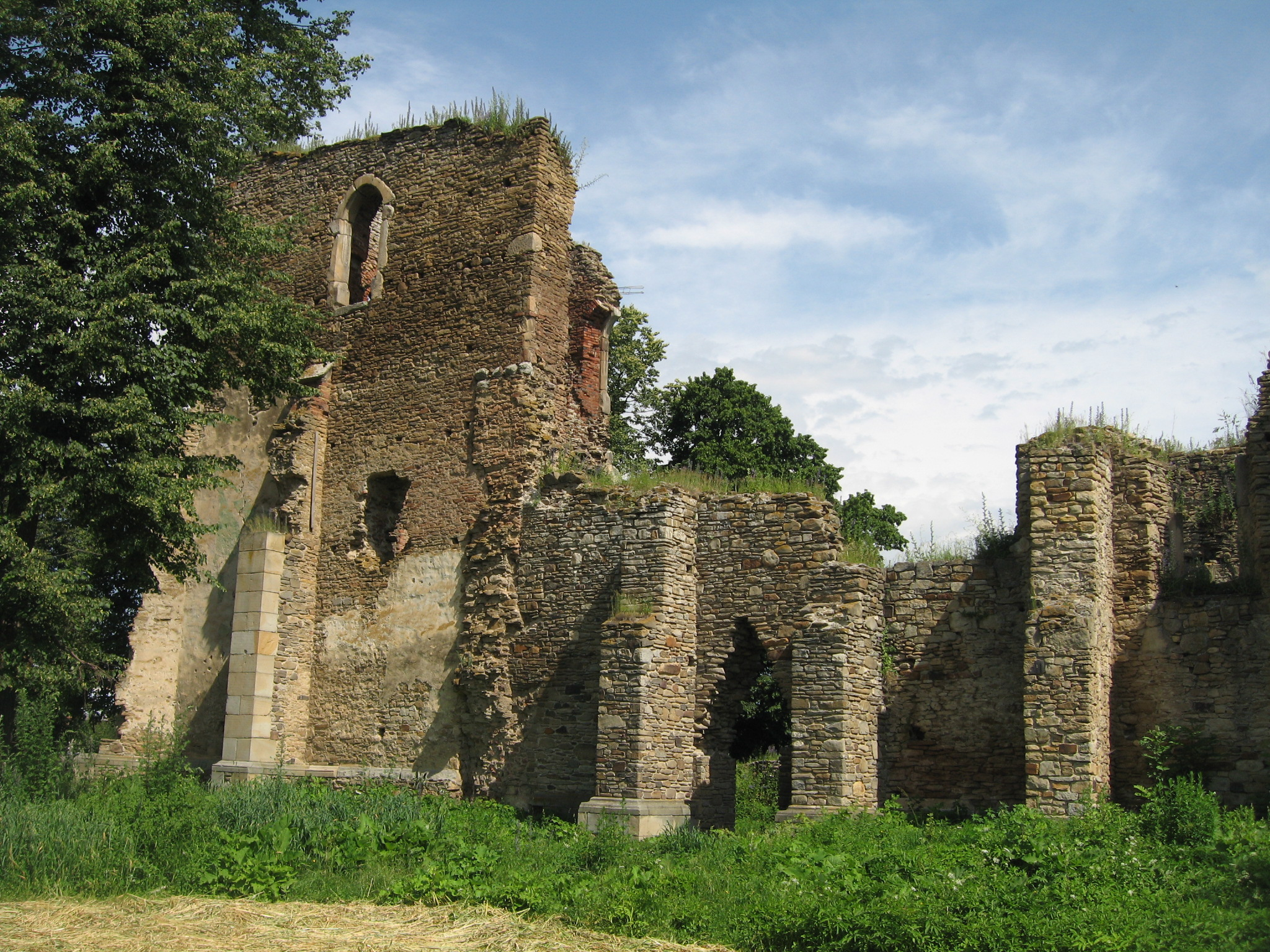
Ruins of the early 15th century local Roman Catholic cathedral, once erected by the Transylvanian Saxon colonists.

There has been a settlement in Baia since the 13th century, but the first written evidence is from the following century. It is possible that a document in Poland mentions the town in 1335, when a certain merchant was mentioned by the name of "Alexa Moldaowicz" (i.e., Alexa from the Town of Moldavia) and the next was in 1345, when Baia is placed on a list of towns of the Franciscan missionaries.

It was through Baia that the army of King Louis I of Hungary went when conquering the region around 1345–1347. There is evidence of a large fire dated mid-14th century discovered by the archeologists and associated with this conquest.

The early Moldavian chronicles place the first capital of Moldavia in Baia, but it was only an interim capital. Soon the court was moved to Siret, and Baia was not even a county seat by the time of Bogdan I of Moldavia.

After the Hungarian conquest, colonists from Transylvania settled in the town, leading to the urbanization of the settlement, which gained a special status. According to chronicler Grigore Ureche, the târg at Baia was founded by "German potters". The area where the colonists settled was reorganized: they built a wooden church and a central marketplace, surrounding which parcels of land were laid out.

By 1400, the inhabitants of the town had a standard of living similar to the urban areas of Transylvania: the houses were heated by cocklestoves and the town's streets paved with river gravel. The town was defended by a wooden palisade which was burnt down in 1467.

The exact ethnic makeup of the townfolks is unknown, but several 15th century documents talk of the "Saxons in Baia". The town's pârgari had a collective ownership over the mills, which is unlike in other Moldavian towns, where the mills were privately owned. The pârgari (local council) and șoltuzes (mayors) were initially elected among the Germans, but this changed with time and in a 1586 document, only half of the pârgari had German or Hungarian names, while the other half had Romanian names, including the șoltuz.

In 1467, Matthias Corvinus began an expedition against Ștefan the Great, who had previously conquered the stronghold of Chilia, previously held by Hungary. During Matthias's campaign, his armies set on fire the Moldavian towns of Trotuș, Bacău, Roman, and Neamț, but he spared the town of Baia, in which he settled in a fortified stone house in the center. Ștefan cel Mare attacked and burnt the town on the night of December 15, 1467, in the prelude to the Battle of Baia.

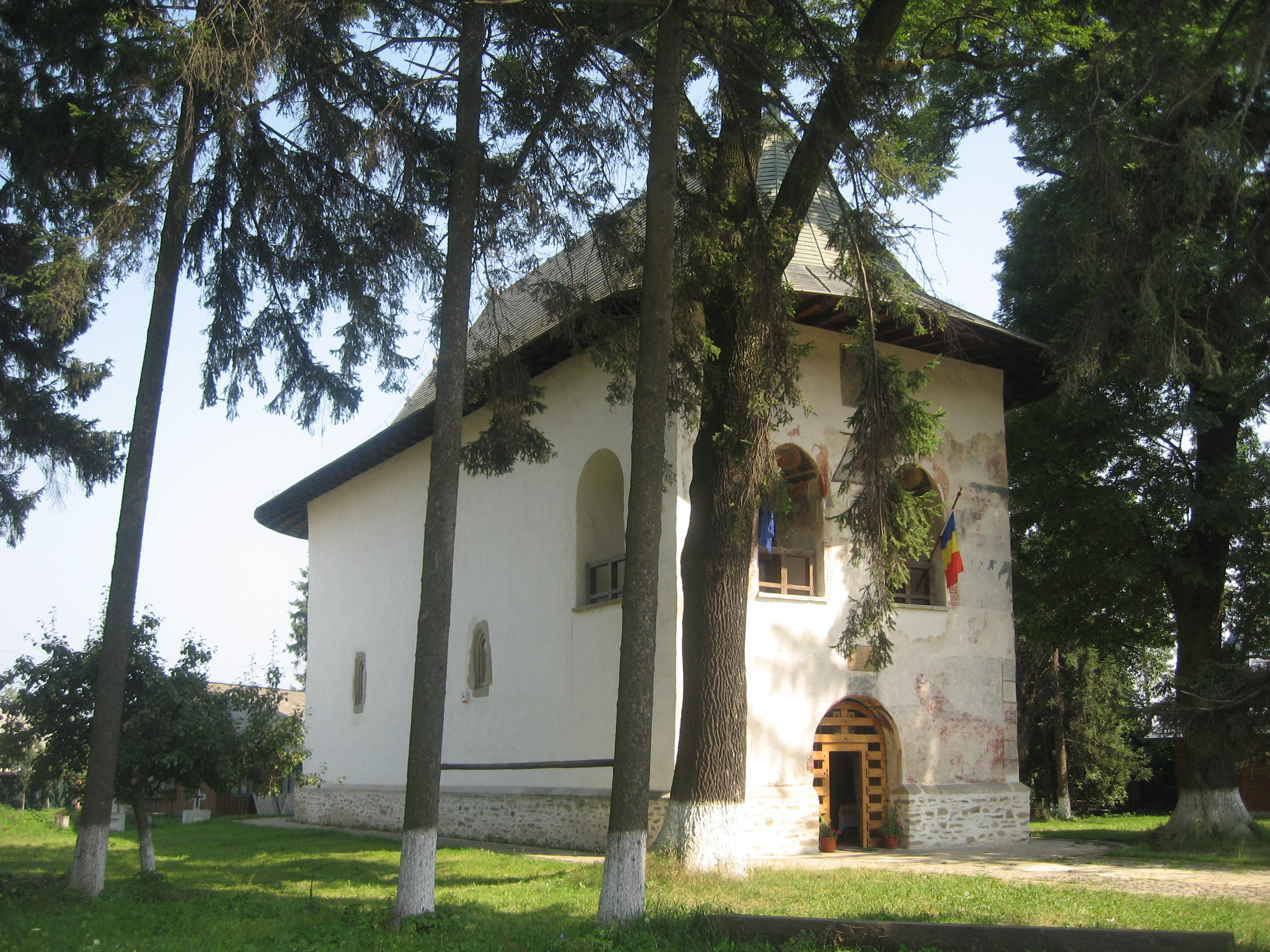
Church of the Assumption of Virgin Mary in Baia

The town entered a decline after the beginning of the Protestant Reformation and the persecutions of Catholics in 16th century. The Catholics of Baia switched to Protestantism and the last bishop of Baia is recorded in 1523. The town of Suceava took over Baia's importance in trade and the town of Baia reverted to be a simple village, as it is today.

== Demographics ==
At the 2002 census, the commune had a population of 6,793. At the 2011 Romanian census, Baia had a population of 6,405, of which 95.88% were Romanians, while at the 2021 census the population had increased to 7,261, of which 93.49% were Romanians.
