= Miron Costin =

Moldavian political figure and chronicler (1633–1691)

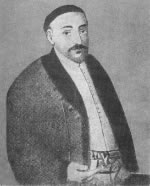
Miron Costin

Miron Costin (March 30, 1633 – 1691) was a political figure and chronicler from Moldavia. His main work, Letopiseţul Ţărâi Moldovei [de la Aron Vodă încoace] (The Chronicles of the land of Moldavia [from the rule of Aron Vodă]) was meant to extend Grigore Ureche's narrative, covering events from 1594 to 1660. The Chronicles were first published in 1675.

He also wrote Istoria în versuri polone despre Ţara Moldovei şi Munteniei (Polish verse history of Moldavia and Wallachia), also known under the title Poema polonă (The Polish poem).

== Life ==
Miron Costin was born as the son of a rich Moldavian boyar (Ion or Iancu). He spent his earliest years in Poland, where his family had taken refuge from Ottoman violence in Moldavia. His father had become a Polish magnate, which gave Miron the right to study at the Jesuit College in Bar, then at Kamienec Podolski.

He returned to Moldavia in 1653, and became a trainee of the country's treasury. Valued by the administration, he rose quickly, becoming Vornic in 1669 (i.e.: overseer of the Court, with several political responsibilities both inside the state and abroad).

In 1691 his relation with Prince Constantin Cantemir deteriorated. He and his brother (Hatman Velicico) were believed to have tried to usurp the throne in Iaşi: both were executed in Roman.

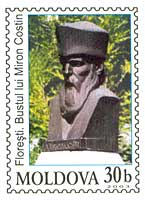

== Works ==
- Viiaţa lumii 1672
- The translation of Origines et occasus Transsylvanorum (Lyon, 1667) by Laurențiu Toppeltin of Mediaș
- Letopiseţul Ţărâi Moldovei de la Aron Vodă încoace 1675 German translation
- Chronika ziem Moldawskich y Multanskich (Cronica țărilor Moldovei și Munteniei) (in Polish)
- Istoria în versuri polone despre Ţara Moldovei şi Munteniei (Poema polonă) 1684
- De neamul moldovenilor approx. 1687
