= John of Küküllő =

Hungarian clergyman

John of Küküllő (Hungarian: Küküllei/Küküllői János, Latin: Iohannes de Kikullew, Romanian: Ioan de Târnave; c. 1320–1393) was a Hungarian clergyman, royal official and historian.

== Family ==
Born as John Apród of Tótsolymos, John was the son of Miklós Apród, a nobleman who received Tótsolymos (now Šarišské Sokolovce in Slovakia) from Charles I of Hungary. He was born around 1320.

== Career ==
He worked as a notary for the royal chancery before 1350. He became a canon in the Arad Chapter and the Eger Chapter in 1352.

He died between 15 September and 10 December 1393.

== Chronicle of King Louis ==
He wrote a biography of Louis I of Hungary after 1360. He was the first Hungarian historian to use royal charters while writing his book.

== Sources ==
- Engel, Pál (2001). The Realm of St Stephen: A History of Medieval Hungary, 895–1526. I.B. Tauris Publishers. ISBN 1-86064-061-3.
- Köblös, József (1994). "Küküllei János". In Kristó, Gyula; Engel, Pál; Makk, Ferenc (eds.). Korai magyar történeti lexikon (9–14. század) [Encyclopedia of the Early Hungarian History (9th–14th centuries)] (in Hungarian). Akadémiai Kiadó. p. 387. ISBN 963-05-6722-9.
