= Sas of Moldavia =

Sas
- Voivode of Moldavia
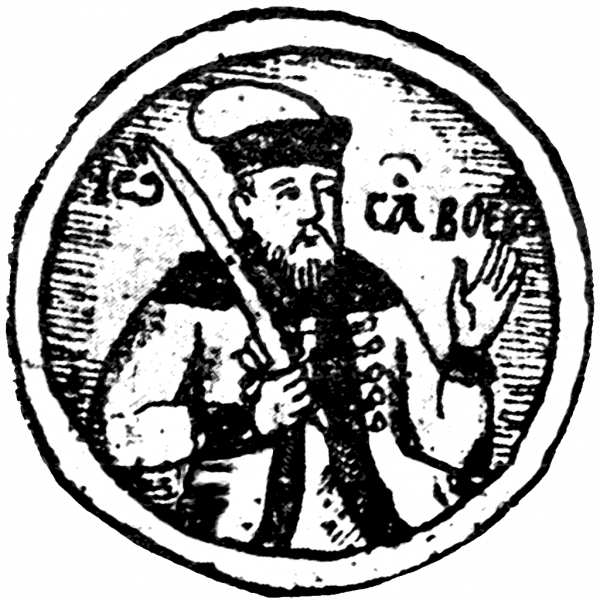
- Reign: c. 1353/1360 – c. 1357/1364
- Predecessor: Dragoş
- Successor: (?) Balc
- Died: c. 1357/1364
- Issue: Balc; Drag; Dragomir; Ştefan
- Dynasty: House of Dragoș
- Father: Dragoş

Sas was, according to the Slavo-Romanian chronicles, the second voivode of Moldavia (c. 1353/1360 – c. 1357/1364). He followed his father Dragoş who had been sent to Moldavia as a representative of king Louis I of Hungary to establish a line of defense against the Golden Horde. All chronicles show that he reigned four years.

According to the sequence of the voivodes listed in the Slavo-Romanian chronicles, he was followed by Bogdan (who would become the first independent ruler of Moldavia), but several historians (e.g., Alexandru Dimitrie Xenopol, Ştefan Pascu) consider Balc as his successor. Victor Spinei thinks that Bogdan came to Moldavia immediately after the death of Sas, before Balc was able to consolidate his reign.

The Drágfi of Béltek family, whose estates would encompass over a hundred villages in the Kingdom of Hungary, descended from one of his sons, Drag.

== Sources ==
- Köpeczi, Béla (General Editor) – Makkai, László; Mócsy, András; Szász, Zoltán (Editors) – Barta, Gábor (Assistant Editor): History of Transylvania - Volume I: From the beginnings to 1606; Akadémiai Kiadó, 1994, Budapest; ISBN 963-05-6703-2
- Spinei, Victor: Moldavia in the 11th-14th Centuries; Editura Academiei Republicii Socialiste România, 1986, Bucharest
- Treptow, Kurt W. – Popa, Marcel: Historical Dictionary of Romania (the list ‘Rulers of Romania – Moldavia’, and entry ‘Dragoş (Mid-14th Century)’); The Scarecrow Press, Inc., 1996, Lanham (Maryland, USA) & Folkestone (UK); ISBN 0-8108-3179-1

Sas of Moldavia House of Dragoș
Regnal titles
Preceded by Dragoș	Voivode of Moldavia; 1353-1360 – 1357-1364	Succeeded by Balc
