= Balc of Moldavia =

Balc
- Voivode of Moldavia
- Reign: 1359 or 1364
- Predecessor: Sas
- Successor: Bogdan I
- Died: (?) 1399
- Dynasty: House of Dragoș
- Father: Sas

Balc (Hungarian: Balk) was, according to many historians (e.g., Alexandru Dimitrie Xenopol, Ştefan Pascu), the third voivode of Moldavia, ruling in ca. 1359 or 1364, but the sequence of the voivodes listed in the Romanian chronicles does not refer to him. He was the son of Sas, the second voivode of Moldavia.

Although Balc was the legitimate pretender to the throne, Bogdan, who had been voivode in Maramureș, crossed the Carpathian Mountains into Moldavia possibly immediately after the death of Sas, before Balc was able to consolidate his reign. In Moldavia, Bogdan joined local forces opposed to the Hungarian monarchy.

Balc fought valiantly at the head of his men, but he was severely wounded and lost several members of his family and retinue. Following his defeat, Balc fled Moldavia for Hungary.

According to a diploma issued on February 2, 1365, King Louis I of Hungary (1342–1382) gave Cuhea and other possessions in Maramureș to Balc and his brothers for their faith towards their sovereign and particularly for their devoted behavior in Moldavia. The domains around Cuhea had belonged to Bogdan, but the king had confiscated them in order to compensate Balc and his brothers for the loss of the state east of the Carpathians.

Later, Balc became the head of Szatmár (Sătmar), Ugocsa and Máramaros (Maramureș) counties in the Kingdom of Hungary, and he was also invested with the title of Count of the Székelys.

== Sources ==
- Engel, Pál: Magyarország világi archontológiája (1301-1457) /The Temporal Archontology of Hungary (1301–1457)/; História - MTA Történettudományi Intézete, 1996, Budapest; ISBN 963-8312-43-2.
- Spinei, Victor: Moldavia in the 11th-14th Centuries; Editura Academiei Republicii Socialiste România, 1986, Bucharest
- Treptow, Kurt W. – Popa, Marcel: Historical Dictionary of Romania (the list ‘Rulers of Romania – Moldavia’); The Scarecrow Press, Inc., 1996, Lanham (Maryland, US) & Folkestone (UK); ISBN 0-8108-3179-1
- Vásáry, István: Cumans and Tatars: Oriental Military in the Pre-Ottoman Balkans, 1185-1365; Cambridge University Press, 2005, Cambridge; ISBN 0-521-83756-1

Balc of Moldavia House of Dragoș Died: (?) 1399
Regnal titles
Preceded by Sas	(?) Voivode in Moldavia c. 1359/1364	Succeeded by Bogdan I
Preceded by László Bebek	Count of Szatmár County; 1377–1388	Succeeded by Péter Perényi
Preceded by András Kölcsei	Count of Ugocsa County; 1377–1398	Succeeded by Péter Perényi
Preceded by Simon Meggyesi	Count of Máramaros County; 1378–1382	Succeeded by György Jakcs
Preceded by Dezső Serkei	Count of Máramaros County; 1385–1399	Succeeded by Péter Perényi
Preceded by Miklós Losonci	Count of the Székelys; 1387–1390	Succeeded by János Bélteki
