= Vlad Georgescu =

Romanian historian and academic (1937–1988)

Vlad Georgescu (October 20, 1937 – November 13, 1988) was a Romanian historian, academic, political dissident, and director of the Romanian-language department of Radio Free Europe between 1983 and 1988.

== Biography ==
Born in Bucharest, Georgescu studied history at the University of Bucharest, and worked at the Romanian-Russian Museum until it was closed down in 1963, when he was transferred to the Institute of Southeastern European Studies in Bucharest. He earned a PhD in history from the University of Bucharest in 1970 and published works on 18th and 19th century Romanian history. Georgescu taught in 1967 and 1968 at the University of California, Los Angeles and in 1973 at Columbia University.

In 1977, Georgescu was jailed for two months for disputing the role of the Communist Party in history in the manuscript of a book which he had sent abroad. Two years later he left the country, becoming a fellow at the Woodrow Wilson International Center for Scholars in Washington, D.C., and teaching at the University of Maryland and at Rutgers University. Georgescu then returned to Europe and worked for the Radio Free Europe.

In 1987, a week after Georgescu announced that he would broadcast fragments from Ion Mihai Pacepa's Red Horizons, he received a warning from a Securitate general that he would not live more than a year if he went on to broadcast it. Georgescu ignored the warning and went ahead and broadcast it. A year later, he died of a malignant brain tumor at the age of 51 in Munich. In 2007, Cotidianul published informative notes sent by Constantin Bălăceanu-Stolnici to the Securitate, which included a sketch of Georgescu's Munich apartment, drawn after a visit to see Georgescu, which might have enabled the possible assassination of Georgescu.

Georgescu and his wife, Mary, had a son, Tudor.

== Bibliography ==
- Din corespondența diplomatică a Țării Romînești, Muzeul Romîno-Rus, București, 1962, 268 p.
- Political Ideas and the Enlightenment in the Romanian Principalities (1750–1831), Boulder (East European Quarterly), New York (Columbia University Press), 1971
- Ideile politice și iluminismul în principatele române (1750–1831), Editura Academiei RSR, București, 1972
- Politică și istorie: cazul comuniștilor români 1944–1977, editura Jon Dumitru (colecția Clio fără mască), München, 1981 (reprinted in Romania after 1990 by Editura Humanitas), 158 p.
- Istoria românilor de la origini pînă în zilele noastre, München, 1984, 394 p. (ed. a III-a, Editura Humanitas, București, 1992)
- Istoria ideilor politice românești, editura Jon Dumitru (colecția Clio fără mască), München, 1987
- Romania anilor '80, editura Jon Dumitru (colecția Clio fără mască), München, 1994, 254 p.
