= Grigore Ureche =

Moldavian chronicler

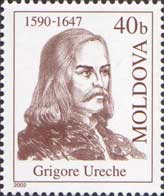

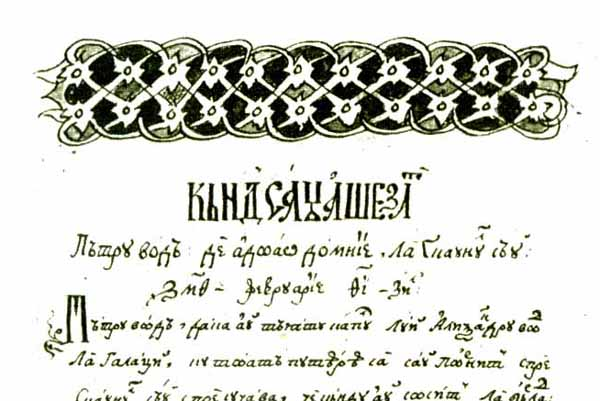
A page of his "Letopiseț" manuscript

Grigore Ureche (Romanian pronunciation: [ɡriˈɡore uˈreke]; 1590–1647) was a Moldavian chronicler who wrote on Moldavian history in his Letopisețul Țării Moldovei (Chronicles of the Land of Moldavia), covering the period from 1359 to 1594.

== Biography ==
Grigore Ureche was the son of the influential Moldovan boyar Nestor Ureche, who was an advisor to a prince in Poland. Ureche spent his childhood in the Polish–Lithuanian Commonwealth, where he studied at the Jesuit College in L'viv. After returning to the Principality of Moldavia, he held many high-ranking offices in the courts of several Moldovan Hospodars. During the reign of Vasile Lupu (from 1634) Ureche became the administrator of Lower Moldavia.

== Significance ==
Ureche is the first to assert the existence of the Romanian language and its Romance character. He also acknowledges the common Roman origin of the Romanians from Moldavia, Wallachia and Transylvania.

== See also ==
- Miron Costin
- Ion Neculce
- Dimitrie Cantemir
