= Erdődy =

Hungarian noble family

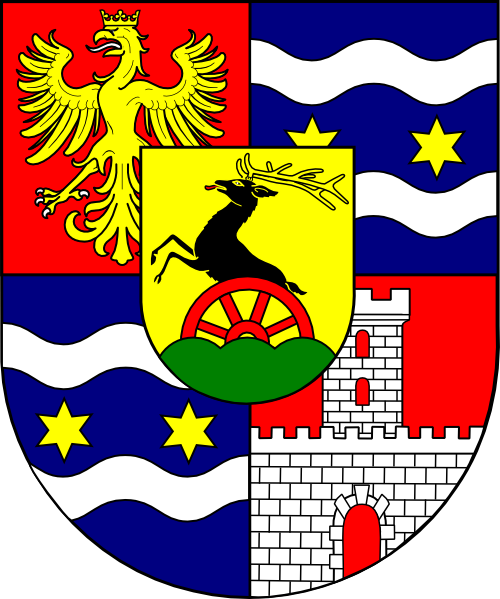
House of Erdődy coat of arms

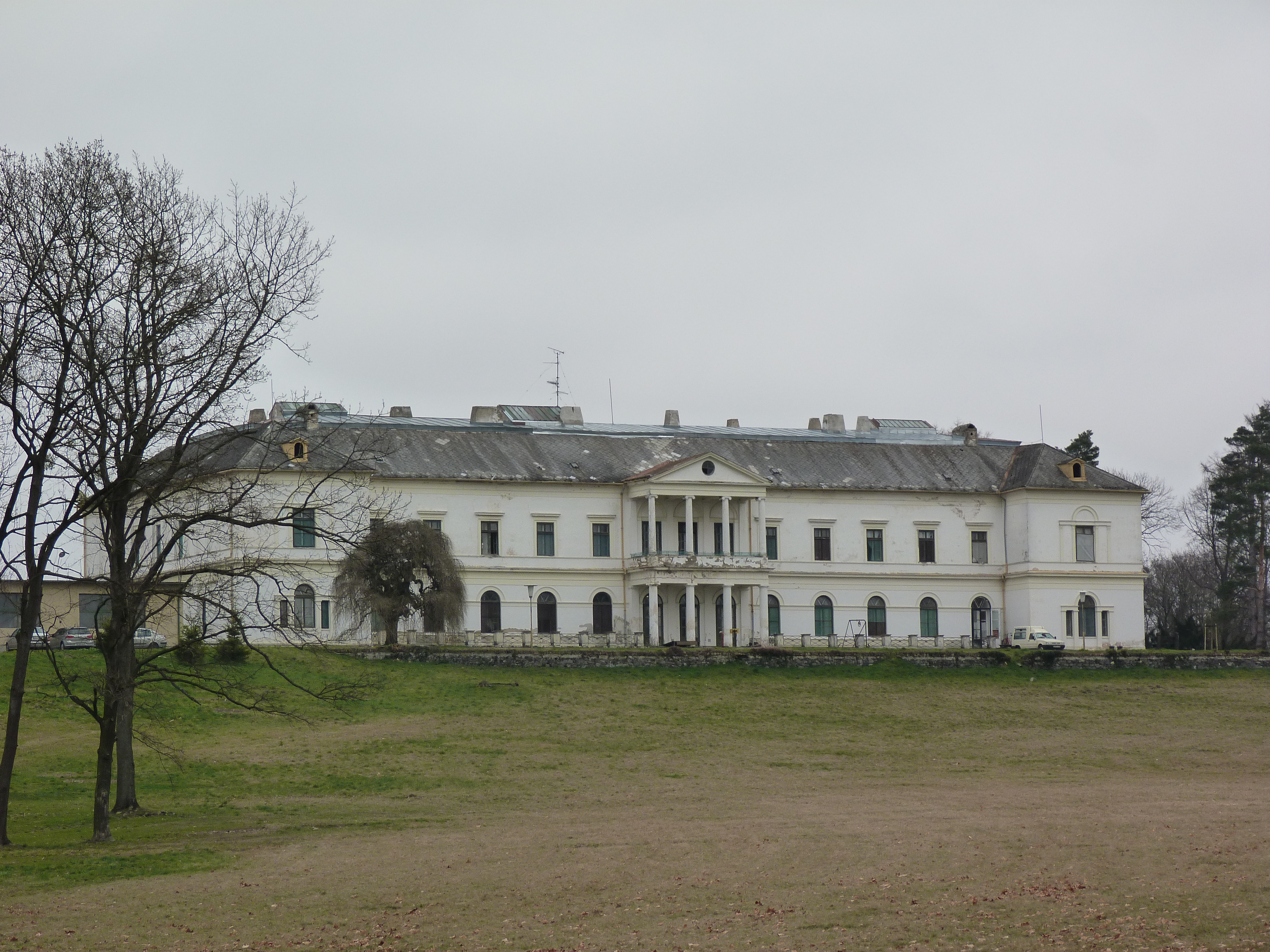
Erdődy Mansion, Doba, Hungary

The House of Erdődy de Monyorókerék et Monoszló (also House of Erdödy) is the name of an old Hungarian-Croatian noble family with possessions in Hungary and Croatia. Elevated to the Hungarian nobility in 1459, the family was subsequently raised to the rank of Count in 1485. In 1565, the family was then recognised by the Habsburg monarchy, which granted them the title Reichsgraf / Gräfin. The family was raised again in 1566 to the rank of Reichfürst; but the death the following year of the recipient (Péter II) prevented the title from being registered and so it did not become hereditary.

== History ==
The family was first raised in a document dated 1187, under the name of Bakoch de genere Erdewd. It received the title of Count in 1485. (The first hereditary count in Hungary was John Hunyadi in 1453 by King Ladislaus V). The family's origins were from the town of Erdőd (Romanian: Ardud, German: Erdeed) which is in Szatmár (now Satu Mare, Romania). They are barons of Monyorókerék (German: Eberau) and counts of Monoszló (Croatian: Moslavina). Monyorokerék is a small village in the south of Burgenland (today Austria) near the Hungarian border. Monoszló is a region in central Croatia.

The Erdődy family originated from the Bakócz family, initially belonged to the serfdom at the Drágffy estates. They acquired wealth, when Tamás Bakócz became the Archbishop of Esztergom in 1497. After his death his estates were passed down to his nephew Peter and he took the name Erdődy.

Numerous members of the family held important offices: judges of the royal court, masters of the treasury, chamberlains, Croatian bans, bishops, Master[s] of the Horse and generals were among the members of the family. In 1607, because of the family's great contribution to the Croatian-Ottoman Wars, King Rudolph named the family the perpetual counts of Varaždin County, and they consequently gave 17 župans up until 1845.

== Notable members ==
- Péter "Venetianus" Erdődy (b. 1484, d. 1543)
- Péter Erdődy (b. 1504, d. 1567)
- Tamás Erdődy (b. 1558, d. 1624)
- Miklós Erdődy (d. 1693)
- György Lipót Erdődy (b. 1674, d. 1758)
- János Nepomuk Erdődy (b. 1733, d.1806) Ban of Croatia, field marshal and politician
- József Erdődy (b. 1754, d.1824) – Knight of the Golden Fleece, patron of Haydn's Erdődy quartets (Op. 76)
- Anna Maria Erdődy née von Niczky (1779–1837), wife of Péter Erdődy, possible candidate for Beethoven's muse, the 'immortal beloved'.
- Sándor Lajos Erdődy (b. 1802, d. 1881) joined the Batthyany and Kossuth cabinet but withdrew due to their extremist views. politician, anthropologist, painter, poet
- István Erdődy (b. 1813, d. 1896) Mediated the Austro-Hungarian compromise of 1848
- Sidonija Erdődy Rubido (b. 1819, d. 1884) Opera singer
- Ferenc Xavér Erdődy (b. 1830, d. 1896)
- István (Stjepan) Erdődy (b. 1848, d. 1922) Politician, last owner of Jastrebarsko estate
- Tamás Erdődy (b. 1886, d. 1931) Aide-de-camp and childhood friend of the last Emperor Charles

The family owned many estates in western Hungary and in Croatia and were one of the largest landowners in the empire, making them magnates of the empire. The Palais Erdődy in Vienna, which was acquired by the Erdődy family from the Esterházys, suffered bombing damage during World War II and was consequently demolished in 1955.

After the collapse of the Austro-Hungarian Empire, the Erdődys' possessions in the successor states of the monarchy were reduced, mostly through forced expropriation by the Béla Kun regime. This caused some of the family to flee west into Germany and France.

During World War II, the Bavarian royal family, relatives of the Erdődy family, stayed in the castles of Somlóvár and Vép, after they had fled from the Nazis in Germany. The invasion of the Soviet Red Army forced most descendants of the family to flee to the West and resulted in their complete expropriation and the destruction of most of their goods.

== See also ==
- List of titled noble families in the Kingdom of Hungary
