= Beltiug =

Beltiug Bildegg (in German) Krasznabéltek (in Hungarian)
- Commune
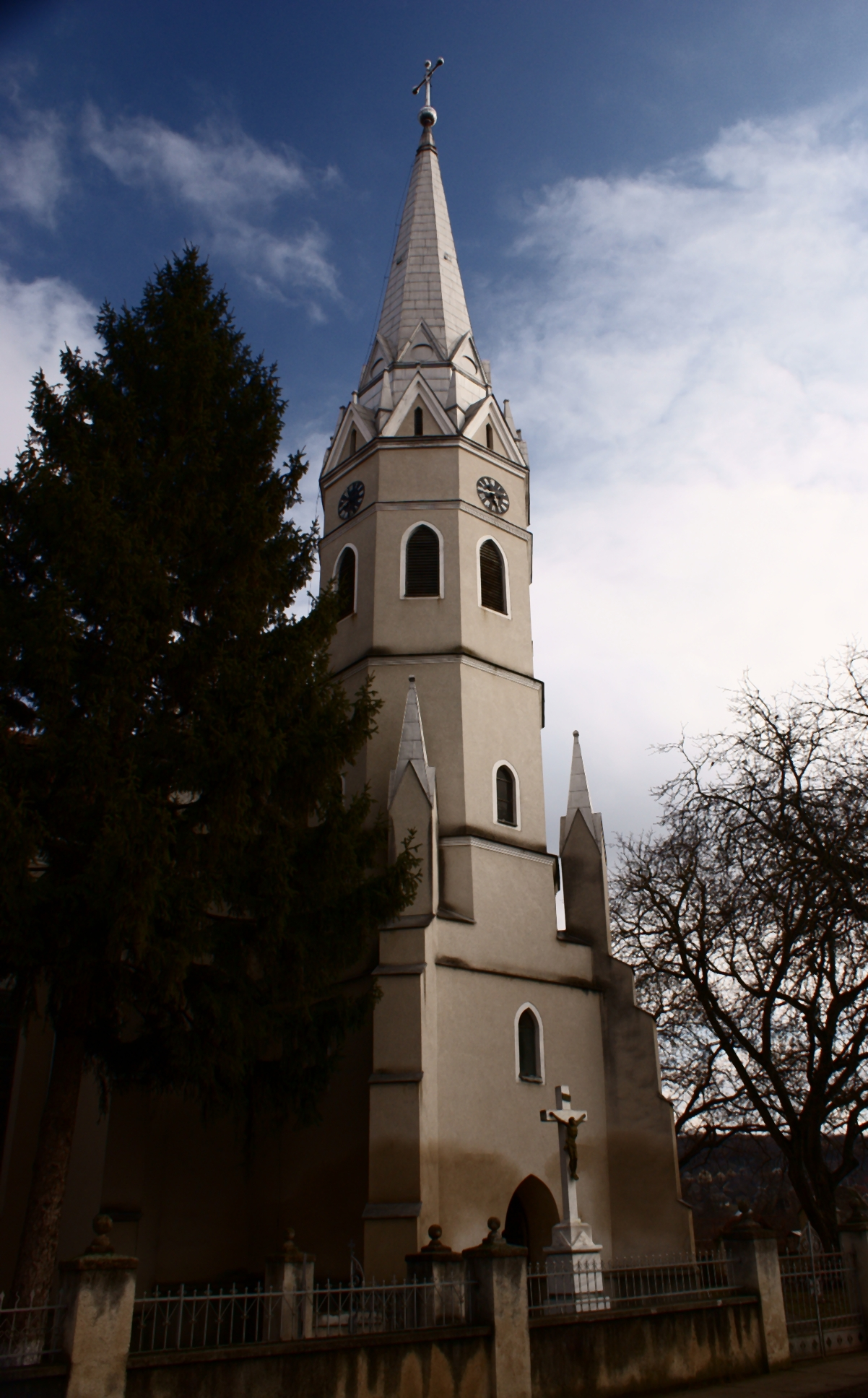
- The Roman Catholic Church of Beltiug, built in 1862 from the donation of Alajos Károlyi

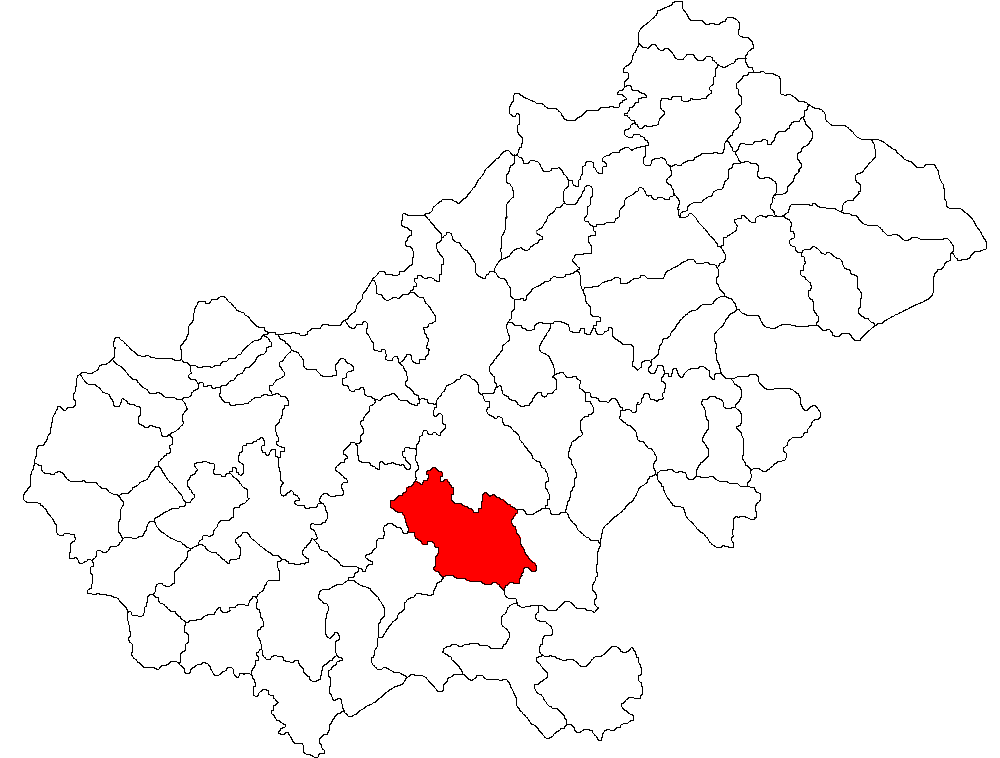
- Location in Satu Mare County

- Location in Romania
- Coordinates: 47°33′N 22°51′E
- Country: Romania
- County: Satu Mare
- Established: Settled before 1216; Incorporated: 1462

Government
  - Mayor (2024–2028): János Bartók Gurzau (PNL)
- Area: 117.03 km^{2} (45.19 sq mi)
- Population (2021-12-01): 3,021
  - Density: 25.81/km^{2} (66.86/sq mi)
- Time zone: UTC+02:00 (EET)
  - Summer (DST): UTC+03:00 (EEST)
- Vehicle reg.: SM

Beltiug (German: Bildegg; Hungarian: Krasznabéltek [ˈkrɒsnɒbeːltɛk] or Béltek) is a commune of 3,228 inhabitants situated in Satu Mare County, Transylvania, Romania. It lies on the banks of the Crasna River south of Ardud, 35 km south of the county seat, Satu Mare, along the main road E81. It is today one of the most important cultural centres of the Sathmar Swabian community.

== History ==
=== Middle Ages ===
Beltiug (Béltek) has a history of several centuries. In 1086, according to the legends, King Saint László camped at this place when he fought against the Pechenegs.

In written sources the settlement was first mentioned in 1216 in the Regestrum Varadinense which introduced all previous judgments in the North West of Transylvania. In 1216, it refers to a man named Pál from Béltek, who sued the Flemish inhabitants of Batar, Ugocsa County (today a village in the Vynohradiv Raion, Ukraine), since his brother Benedek was killed. The Flemish did not deny the fact, but they claimed that they killed him because he committed a criminal offense. The Count of Várad stated that it was an unfounded accusation.

Excavations in the area revealed traces of evidence of the Mongol invasion. In 1241, the Mongols crossed the village and collided with the local inhabitants according to the ancient tombs. These tombs are on a hill which was named Batum-domb (English: Batum Hill) after the leader of the Mongol troops passing by and they still can be found on this hill today north of the settlement.

In 1386 already trade fairs were held there, and in 1462 Béltek received market town right. In the 15th century, it was owned by the Drágffy family, and after the extinction of the family, it came under the king's possession.

The first stone church of the town was built in 1482, at the same time as the church of Erdőd. This is proved by an epigraph from the Knight's Hall of the Castle of Erdőd which shows that in 1482, eight days after the day of Saint George, Bertalan Drágffy commanded that a church have to be built. The church was completed in the same year on August 15, on the day of Holy Mary.

There was also a castle around the church in Béltek. In 1565 John Sigismund Zápolya, the king of Hungary, with the Ottomans attacked the castle of Erdőd. The siege lasted for more than 40 days. The defence forces could not resist the siege, so they gave up. Part of the population was taken into captivity, the other part was executed and the castle was demolished to the bases. There is a presumption that Béltek also had a similar castle. John Sigismund Zápolya in co-operation with the Turks, attacked and destroyed also the Castle of Béltek, which, unlike the Castle Of Erdőd, was never rebuilt.

From 1663 to 1723 the town was owned by Zsigmond Prépostváry and later by Sándor Károlyi.

=== Swabian town ===
Swabians from Württemberg settled in Béltek during the 18th century. On September 6, 1862 there was a great fire in the settlement, with the exception of 1-2 houses, the whole city and the church burnt down. The church was rebuilt on the costs of Count Alajos Károlyi. Béltek was known for its significant vineyards in the 19th century, but also for its thermal bath. The town is currently reviving the wine culture, organizing more wine competitions and renovating the thermal spa.

== Administration ==
The current local council has the following political composition, based on the results of the votes cast at the 2024 Romanian local elections.

Party	Seats	Current Council
National Liberal Party (PNL)	4	
Democratic Alliance of Hungarians in Romania (UDMR/RMDSZ)	3	
Democratic Forum of Germans in Romania (FDGR/DFDR)	3	
Social Democratic Party (PSD)	2	
Save Romania Union (USR)	2	

== Population ==
Historical population
Year	Pop.	±%
1880	4,372	—
1890	4,938	+12.9%
1900	5,304	+7.4%
1910	5,875	+10.8%
1920	6,087	+3.6%
1930	6,457	+6.1%
1941	6,509	+0.8%
1956	6,583	+1.1%
1966	6,002	−8.8%
1977	5,255	−12.4%
1992	3,683	−29.9%
2011	3,228	−12.4%
Source:Census Database

In 2011, it had a population of 3,228; out of them, 35% were Romanian, 32% were Hungarian, 18% were Roma and 11% were German.

== Notable residents ==
- Bertalan Drágffy de Béltek (1447 – 1501), Voivode of Transylvania (1493 - 1498), Count of the Székelys (1479 - 1488)
- Bálint Prépostváry (1540 - 1597)

== Villages ==
Beltiug consists of the following six villages:

- Beltiug (Hungarian: Krasznabéltek)
- Bolda (Hungarian: Alsóboldád)
- Ghirișa (Hungarian: Géres)
- Giungi (Hungarian: Gyöngy)
- Rătești (Hungarian: Szakasz)
- Șandra (Hungarian: Krasznasándorfalu)

=== Giungi ===
The original name of Giungi village was Perlu ("pearl"), first documented in 1215. The original settlers were Germans (Satu Mare Swabians). The name was translated to Hungarian as "Gyöngy", and Romanians took it over as Giungi. It lies at 40 km away from Satu Mare. The Crasna River crosses the village. At the beginning of the 20th century, a significant number of villagers emigrated to the United States, and most of them settled in Aurora, Illinois.

- Coordonates: 47.5667 lat.; 22.7833 long.
- Population: 203 (2002).

It has a Greek-Catholic and an Orthodox church; in the center of the village, between the two churches, there is also one small shop.
