= Drág, Count of the Székelys =

Drag Dragfi de Beltek was Count of the Székelys from 1387 until 1390. He was a member of the House of Dragoș and a descendant of Dragoș, Voivode of Moldavia.

== Biography ==
Until the decline of the Kingdom of Rus, the Moldavian lands were called Ruso-Wallachia and were part of the Kingdom of Rus. The first prince (lord) of Moldova, Dragoş I, had two sons: Sas, lord of Moldova, and Gula (Dzhula) of Giuleşti, prince of Marmaros. Prince (lord) Sas had four sons: Balk, Drago, Dragomir, and Stepan.

Balc was elected voivode of Moldavia in 1363 after the death of his father Sas. In the same year, Bogdan, the rebel voivode of Maramureş County, occupied Moldavia and proclaimed himself master of the state. Prince Balc, Drago, along with his other brothers, sought to regain power and turned to the Hungarian king for help. Louis I sent an army against Bogdan I, but he defeated the expedition sent by Louis, and Balc and Drago had to return to Maramureş and Transcarpathia.

Balk and Drago became princes (voivodes) of the Marmara Region from 1365. They founded an Orthodox monastery in Peri. He was Count of Székely from 1387 to 1390.

The last time it was mentioned in documents was in 1395, the year of the death of Prince Balk.

Drago is the ancestor of the noble family of Dragffy of Béltég (Drágffy, Drágffy de Béltek or Bélteki Drágffy).

== Sources ==
- Joódy Pál - Cercetarea calitắții de nobil in comitatul Maramures. Anii 1749-1769, Editura societắții culturale Pro Maramures "Dragos Vodắ", Cluj-Napoca, 2003
- Joan cavaler de Puscariu - Date istorice privitoare la familiile nobile romắne. Editura societắții culturale Pro Maramures "Dragos Vodắ", Cluj-Napoca, 2003
- Prof. Alexandru Filipascu de Dolha si Petrova - Istoria Maramuresului, Editura "Gutinul" Baia Mare, 1997.
- Wyrostek, Ludwik - Rod Dragow-Sasow na Wegrzech i Rusi Halickiej. RTH t. XI/1931-1932

Drág, Count of the Székelys House of Dragoș
Hungarian nobility
Political offices
Preceded by Miklós Losonci	Count of the Székelys; 1387 – 1390	Succeeded by János Dragfi de Beltek
