= George Szatmári =

Roman Catholic bishop

- Archbishop of Esztergom; Primate of Hungary
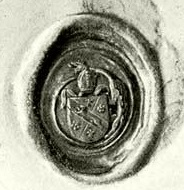
- Seal of George Szatmári
- See: Esztergom
- Appointed: May 1522
- Term ended: 7 April 1524
- Predecessor: Thomas Bakócz
- Successor: Ladislaus Szalkai
- Other posts: Bishop of Veszprém; Bishop of Várad; Bishop of Pécs

Orders
- Ordination: 1506

Personal details
- Born: c. 1457 Kassa, Kingdom of Hungary (today: Košice, Slovakia)
- Died: 7 April 1524 Buda, Kingdom of Hungary
- Buried: Esztergom
- Parents: Stephen Szatmári; Anna N
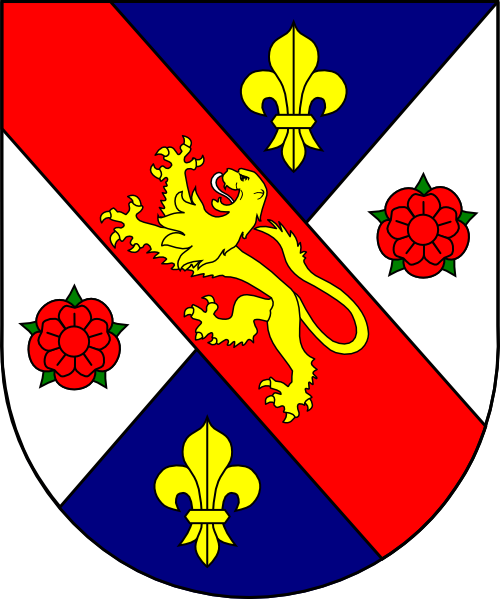
- Coat of arms

George Szatmári de Alsóborsa (Hungarian: alsóborsai Szatmári György; c. 1457 – 7 April 1524) was the Primate of Hungary. He was Bishop of Veszprém from 1499 to 1501, of Várad (present-day Oradea in Romania) from 1501 to 1505, of Pécs from 1505 to 1522, and Archbishop of Esztergom from 1522 until his death.

== Early life ==
George Szatmári was born around 1457 into a wealthy burgher family of German origin in Kassa (present-day Košice in Slovakia). He was the third and youngest son of the merchant Stephen Szatmári and his wife, Anna, also from a family of burghers in Kassa. After his father died in 1464, George was placed under the guardianship of his uncle, Francis Szatmári, the richest citizen of Kassa and mayor of the town in 1477. The Szatmáris had dealings with the Thurzóswho were an influential family of merchants, which facilitated George's career. His family was granted nobility by Matthias Corvinus.

George's wealth financed his studies. He studied at the University of Kraków from 1477 to 1481, then returned to Hungary as a Bachelor of Arts. He knew Filippo Beroaldo, a professor at the University of Bologna, indicating that he also studied at Bologna. Following his uncle's example, he financed renovations at the St. Michael chapel in Kassa.

He started his career at the Royal Chancellery in the early 1490s and became a close assistant of the head of the chancellery, Cardinal Thomas Bakócz. George was made archivist in 1493, and he became one of the two royal secretaries in 1494. He also received prebends (or ecclesiastic benefices). He was canon at the Székesfehérvár Chapter and provost of the St. Nicholas collegiate chapter in the same town in 1495. He was made provost of the Transylvanian Chapter in 1497.

== Career ==
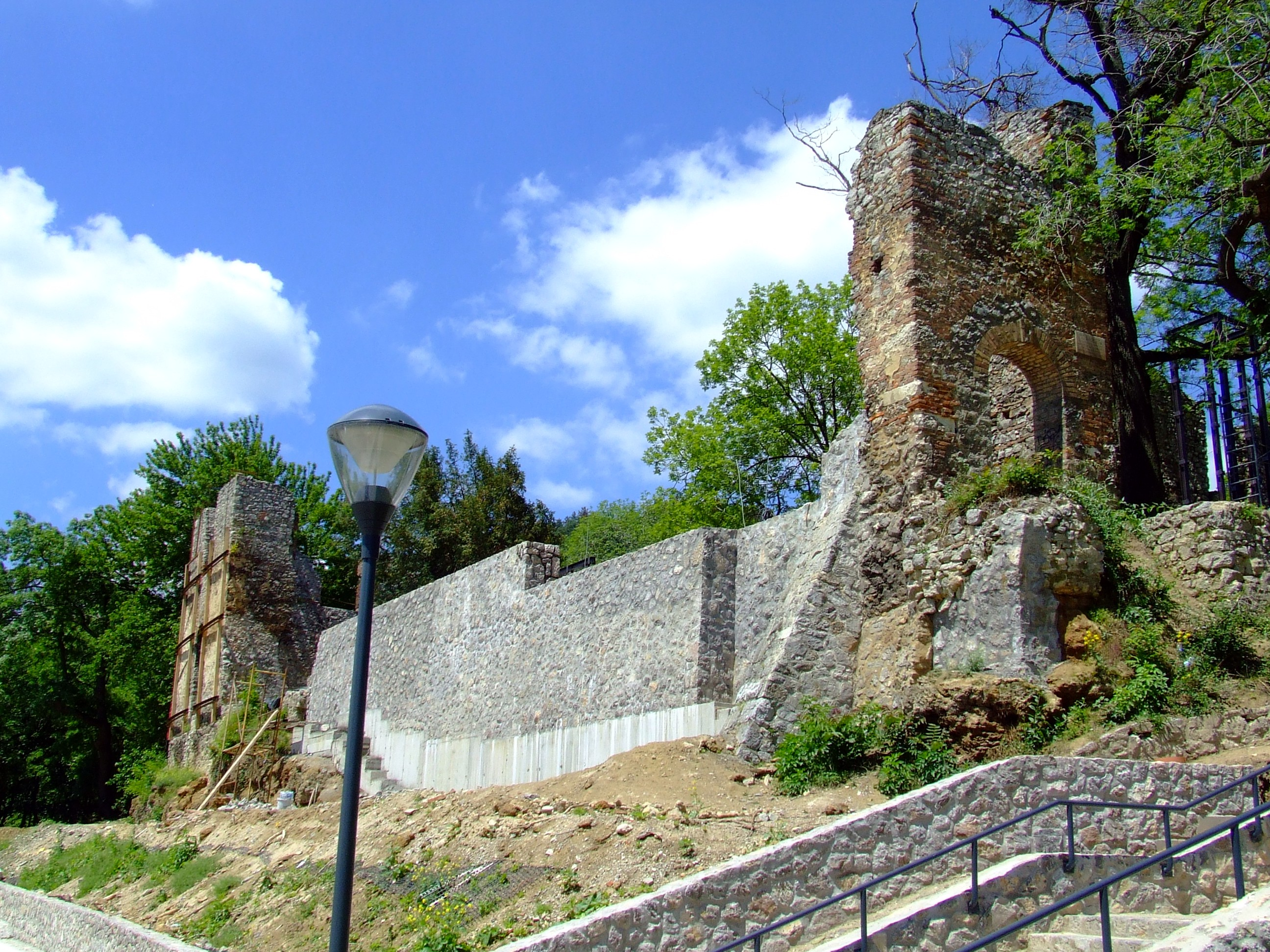
Ruins of Szatmári's Renaissance villa on Tettye hill in Pécs

At the demand of the Diet of Hungary, Vladislaus II of Hungary took the royal seals from Thomas Bakócz in 1497. Bakócz retained the title of arch-chancellor, but Szatmári took charge of the Royal Chancellery. He became the provost of the Óbuda Chapter in 1498 or 1499. Although he had not yet been ordained as a priest, Vladislaus appointed him as bishop of Veszprém and provost of the Budafelhévíz Chapter in 1499. The Holy See confirmed his appointment in April 1500, but also allowed him to postpone his consecration. In 1500, the Diet passed a decree that declared that no one except for Szatmári was entitled to hold more than one ecclesiastical office in the Kingdom of Hungary.

The king assigned him to the bishopric of Várad in 1501. The Holy See confirmed the transfer in February 1502. Vladislaus made Szatmári secret chancellor in 1503. Szatmári and Bakócz were the most influential figures of the government, and the two cooperated closely to diminish the influence of the Diet on state administration. The wealthy John Zápolya was his chief opponent. The 1505 Diet passed a resolution that prohibited the election of a foreign king after Vladislaus's dead, although Szatmári and his allies had openly opposed the decision. Instead of accepting the resolution, Szatmári promoted a rapprochement between Vladislaus and Emperor Maximilian I.

After Sigismund Ernuszt, the Bishop of Pécs, was murdered by his retainers in summer 1505, Vladislaus assigned Szatmári to the bishopric of Pécs. Pope Julius II confirmed the king's decision on 19 December 1505. After being ordained priest, Szatmári held his first mass at the St. Elisabeth Cathedral in Kassa in autumn 1506. He appointed Martin Atádi, titular Bishop of Augustopolis, as his coadjutor bishop.

Szatmári began several building projects in Pécs. A new church tabernacle made of red marble was placed in the cathedral, the episcopal palace was enlarged with a Renaissance level and an open staircase, and a new villa was built on the Tettye hill. The chapter house, which was rebuilt during his tenure in Renaissance style, was named Domus Sakmariana after him. He held conferences with the participation of prominent Humanist scholars, including Girolamo Balbi (who was a friend of Erasmus of Rotterdam), and Nicholas Oláh. Szatmári sponsored the publication of the poems of Janus Pannonius, who had been the bishop of Pécs from 1459 to 1472. He also financed the publishing of works by ancient classical authors, including Cicero.

John Zápolya played a key role in crushing the rebellion of the Hungarian peasants in 1514. Taking advantage of his popularity among the noblemen, John Zápolya ensured that Szatmári was dismissed and Gregory Frankopan, Archbishop of Kalocsa, was made chancellor in his stead. To reduce Zápolya's influence, Szatmári began to bring about a reconciliation between Vladislaus II, Vladislaus's brother, Sigismund of Poland, and Emperor Maximilian. The three monarchs met at Vienna and signed a treaty on 19 July 1515. Vladislaus's son, Louis, married Maximilian's granddaughter, Mary, and Vladislaus's daughter, Anne, was betrothed to either Maximilian or his grandson, Ferdinand. Taking advantage of his participation at the conference, Szatmári visited the University of Vienna. Benedict Chelidonius dedicated his Voluptatis cum Virtute disceptatio ("Debate of Desire and Virtue") to Szatmári.

Vladislaus died on 13 March 1516 and was succeeded by his ten-year-old Louis. His tutors, George, Margrave of Brandenburg-Ansbach, and John Bornemissza, Castellan of Buda, were supporters of a pro-Habsburg policy. Gregory Frankopan was dismissed and Szatmári was reinstated as secret chancellor. Ladislaus Szalkai, the Bishop of Vác, was also appointed chancellor in 1517, but Szatmári remained the most influential among the three chancellors. Geronimo Balbi, who stayed in Buda, commented that Szatmári was "the master of all issues" in the kingdom. He could even persuade the Diet to elect his ally Stephen Báthori, the Palatine of Hungary, against John Zápolya in 1519.

Szatmári succeeded Thomas Bakócz as arch-chancellor in June 1521. He was also made Archbishop of Esztergom in spring 1522. With the support of Maximilian of Habsburg, he tried to achieve his appointment as cardinal and papal legate. He died in Buda on 7 April 1524. He was buried in Esztergom.

== Sources ==
- Borián, Elréd (2003). "Szatmári II. György [George II Szatmári]". In Beke, Margit (ed.). Esztergomi érsekek 1001–2003 [Archbishops of Esztergom 1001–2003] (in Hungarian). Szent István Társulat. pp. 232–234. ISBN 963-361-472-4.
- Engel, Pál (2001). The Realm of St Stephen: A History of Medieval Hungary, 895–1526. I.B. Tauris Publishers. ISBN 1-86064-061-3.
- Farbaky, Péter (2009). "The Role of High Priests in the Dissemination of Early Renaissance Forms in Hungary". In Lemerle, Frédérique; Pauwels, Yves; Toscano, Gennaro (eds.). Les Cardinaux de la Renaissance et la modernité artistique [The Cardinals of the Renaissance and the Modern Arts]. Institut de Recherches Historiques du Septentrion. pp. 263–275. ISBN 978-2-905637-55-0.
- Fedeles, Tamás (2009). "A 14. század derekától Mohácsig [From the mid-14th century to the Battle of Mohács]". In Fedeles, Tamás; Sarbak, Gábor; Sümegi, József (eds.). A Pécsi Egyházmegye története I: A középkor évszázadai (1009–1543) [A History of the Diocese of Pécs, Volume I: Medieval Centuries, 1009–1543] (in Hungarian). Fény Kft. pp. 109–154. ISBN 978-963-88572-0-0.
- Juhász-Ormsby, Ágnes (2012). "Humanist Networks and Drama in Pre-Reformation Central Europe: Bartholomeus Frankfordinus Pannonius and the "Sodalitas Litteraria Danubiana"". Renaissance and Reformation. 35 (2): 5–34. doi:10.33137/rr.v35i2.19369.
- Markó, László (2006). A magyar állam főméltóságai Szent Istvántól napjainkig: Életrajzi Lexikon [Great Officers of State in Hungary from King Saint Stephen to Our Days: A Biographical Encyclopedia] (in Hungarian). Helikon Kiadó. ISBN 963-547-085-1.

Catholic Church titles
Preceded by John Vitéz	Bishop of Veszprém; 1499–1501	Succeeded by Gregory Frankopan
Preceded by Dominic Kálmáncsehi	Bishop of Várad; 1501–1505	Succeeded by Sigismund Thurzó
Preceded by Sigismund Ernuszt	Bishop of Pécs; 1505–1522	Succeeded by Philip Móré
Preceded by Thomas Bakócz	Archbishop of Esztergom; 1522–1524	Succeeded by Ladislaus Szalkai
