= John Drágfi =

Judge Royal of the Kingdom of Hungary

John Drágfi de Beltek was Judge Royal of the Kingdom of Hungary from 1525 until 1526 and also Count of Kraszna County from 1515 until 1526, Master of the cupbearers and Count of Közép-Szolnok County. He was a member of the House of Dragoș and a descendant of Dragoș, Voivode of Moldavia.

== Sources ==
- Joódy Pál - Cercetarea calitắții de nobil in comitatul Maramures. Anii 1749–1769, Editura societắții culturale Pro Maramures "Dragos Vodắ", Cluj-Napoca, 2003
- Joan cavaler de Puscariu - Date istorice privitoare la familiile nobile romắne. Editura societắții culturale Pro Maramures "Dragos Vodắ", Cluj-Napoca, 2003
- Prof. Alexandru Filipascu de Dolha si Petrova - Istoria Maramuresului, Editura "Gutinul" Baia Mare, 1997.
- Wyrostek, Ludwik - Rod Dragow-Sasow na Wegrzech i Rusi Halickiej. RTH t. XI/1931-1932

John Drágfi House of Dragoș
Hungarian nobility
Political offices
Preceded by Ambrose Sárkány	Judge Royal of the Kingdom of Hungary; 1525 - 1526	Succeeded by Alexius Thurzó
