= Palais Erdődy =

Coordinates: 48.20555°N 16.37364°E

Palais Erdődy, originally known as Palais Esterházy, was a palace located at Krugerstraße 10 in the Innere Stadt district of Vienna, Austria. It was commissioned around 1810 by Nikolaus II, Prince Esterházy, to be designed and built by French-born architect Charles Moreau.

The palace was three-stories high and built in the Empire style. The entrance was an enormous archway with a coffered ceiling. From there, a staircase decorated with Corinthian columns led to an elegant ballroom with mirrored double-doors, walls clad in white, artificial marble, gilded capitals, frescoes, and a richly decorated parquet floor. It was considered to be one of Vienna's best examples of 19th-century Empire architecture.

The palace was sold by the Esterházy family in the 1870s to the Erdődy family, after which the palace was renamed. The building was damaged during World War II. The property was bought in 1953 by the Verein der Freunde des Wohnungseigentums (German for 'Association of Friends of Home Ownership'), which had the palace demolished around 1955 to make way for an apartment building (now known as Rudolf-Deibl-Hof).
