= House of Dragoș =

Moldavian noble family

House of Dragoș (Drăgoșești)
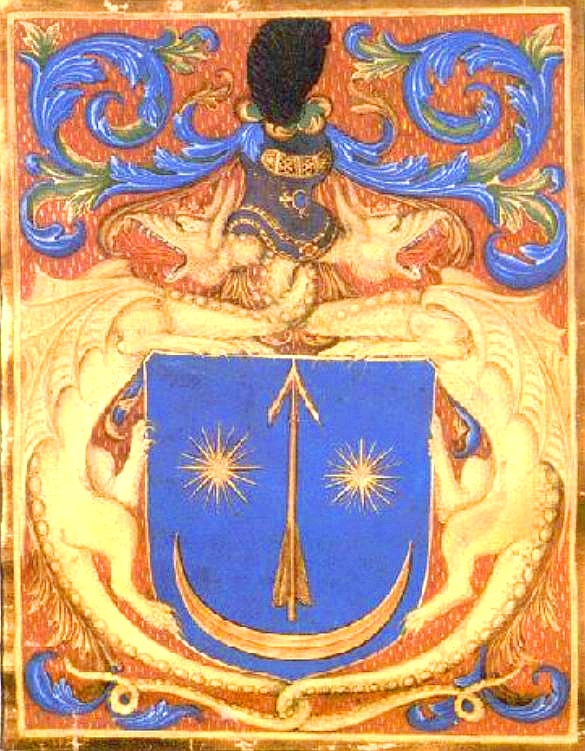

- Country: Moldavia, Kingdom of Hungary; Kingdom of Poland; Grand Duchy of Lithuania
- Founded: 1352: Dragoș, Voivode of Moldavia
- Titles: Prince of Moldavia; Voivode of Maramureș; Voivode of Transylvania; Count of Szatmár County; Count of Ugocsa County; Count of Máramaros County; Count of the Székelys; Judge Royal of the Kingdom of Hungary; Count of Kraszna County; Master of the cupbearers; Count of Közép-Szolnok County

The House of Dragoș, also known as the House of Drăgoșești (Hungarian: Drágfy, Drágffy, Drágffi, Drágfi), was an ancient Moldavian noble family. It was founded by Dragoș (also known as Dragoș Vodă or Dragoș of Bedeu), who was traditionally considered the first ruler or prince of Moldavia and who was Voivode in Maramureș.

== Coat of arms and history ==
Voivode Dragoș I (possibly the same as Dragoș of Bedeu), Voivode of Maramureș, Prince of Moldavia and his successor son Sas de Béltek, Prince of Moldavia, bore the blue (azure) escutcheon with the gold crescent, gold stars and gold arrow on their coat of arms. Other notable scions of Dragoş I were Bartolomeu Drágfi of Béltek, Comes Perpetuus of Közép-Szolnok County (1479–1488), Voivode of Transylvania and Comes of the Székely people (1493–1499), who had distinguished himself earlier as a royal knight of the Hungarian Royal Court defeating the Ottoman Turks at the Battle of Breadfield (1479) together with Pál Kinizsi, István Báthory, Vuk Branković and Basarab Laiotă cel Bătrân. At the time of King Matthias Corvinus' death, Bartholomew Drágfi of Béltek was among the wealthiest landowners of the country, three castles, two manor houses, eight market towns and about 200 villages were in his property. His estates in Közép-Szolnok and Szatmár counties included the castles of Kővár and Erdőd together with the large lordships surrounding them, and further, the castles of Sólyom and the castellum of Csehi. Another important family member, among others, was John Drágfi of Béltek Comes of Temes County in 1525, who died 1526 in the Battle of Mohács.

Sas coat of arms

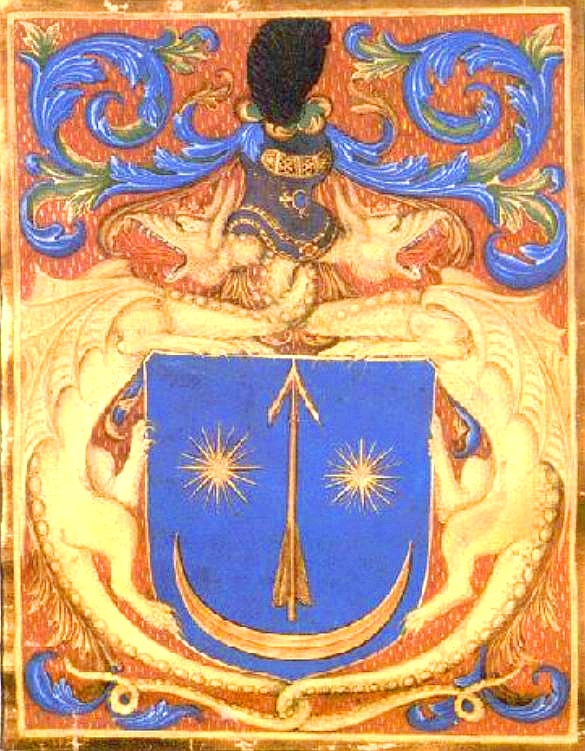
Coat of arms of the family, Drágfi de Beltiug (Hungarian Drágffy de Béltek) scions of Dragoş I of Bedeu

== Notable members ==
- Dragoș, Voivode of Moldavia
- Sas of Moldavia
- Giula of Giulești
- Balc of Moldavia
- Drág, Count of the Székelys
- Bartolomeu Dragfi (Bertalan Drágffy)
- John Drágfi
- Gáspár Drágffy (1506–1545), főispán of Közép-Szolnok.
- Anna Drágffy (1522–1527), spouse of Kristóf Frangepán / Frankopan (died 1527), Ban of Croatia.
- Julianna Drágffy (1498–1500), spouse of András Báthori de Ecsed, Master of the cavalry (Lovászmester), főispán of Szabolcs et Szatmár.

== See also ==
- List of titled noble families in the Kingdom of Hungary

== Sources ==
- C. Tóth, Norbert (2012). "Szász vajda utódainak felemelkedése és bukása. A család vázlatos története 1365–1424 között [The Rise and Fall of the Descendants of Voivode Szász: The Schematic History of the Family between 1365–1424]". In Hegyi, Géza; W. Kovács, András (eds.). A Szilágyság és a Wesselényi család (14–17. század) (in Hungarian). Erdélyi Múzeum-Egyesület. pp. 135–166. ISBN 978-606-8178-64-6.
- Horváth, Richárd (2012). "A bélteki Drágfiak és a királyi udvar kapcsolata a Hunyadiak korában [The family Drágfi of Beltiug (Béltek) and the Royal Court in the Hunyadis' time (1424–1490)]". In Hegyi, Géza; W. Kovács, András (eds.). A Szilágyság és a Wesselényi család (14–17. század) (in Hungarian). Erdélyi Múzeum-Egyesület. pp. 167–212. ISBN 978-606-8178-64-6.
- Neumann, Tibor (2012). "Drágfi Bertalan politikai szerepe II. Ulászló király idején [The Political Role of Bartholomew Drágfi in the reign of King Wladislas II]". In Hegyi, Géza; W. Kovács, András (eds.). A Szilágyság és a Wesselényi család (14–17. század) (in Hungarian). Erdélyi Múzeum-Egyesület. pp. 213–235. ISBN 978-606-8178-64-6.

Princely House of Dragoș (Drăgoșești)
New title	Ruling House of Moldavia; 1345 – 1364	Succeeded by House of Bogdan-Mușat
Preceded by Báthory	Ruling House of Transylvania; 1493 – 1499	Succeeded by Szentgyörgyi
