= Szakoly =

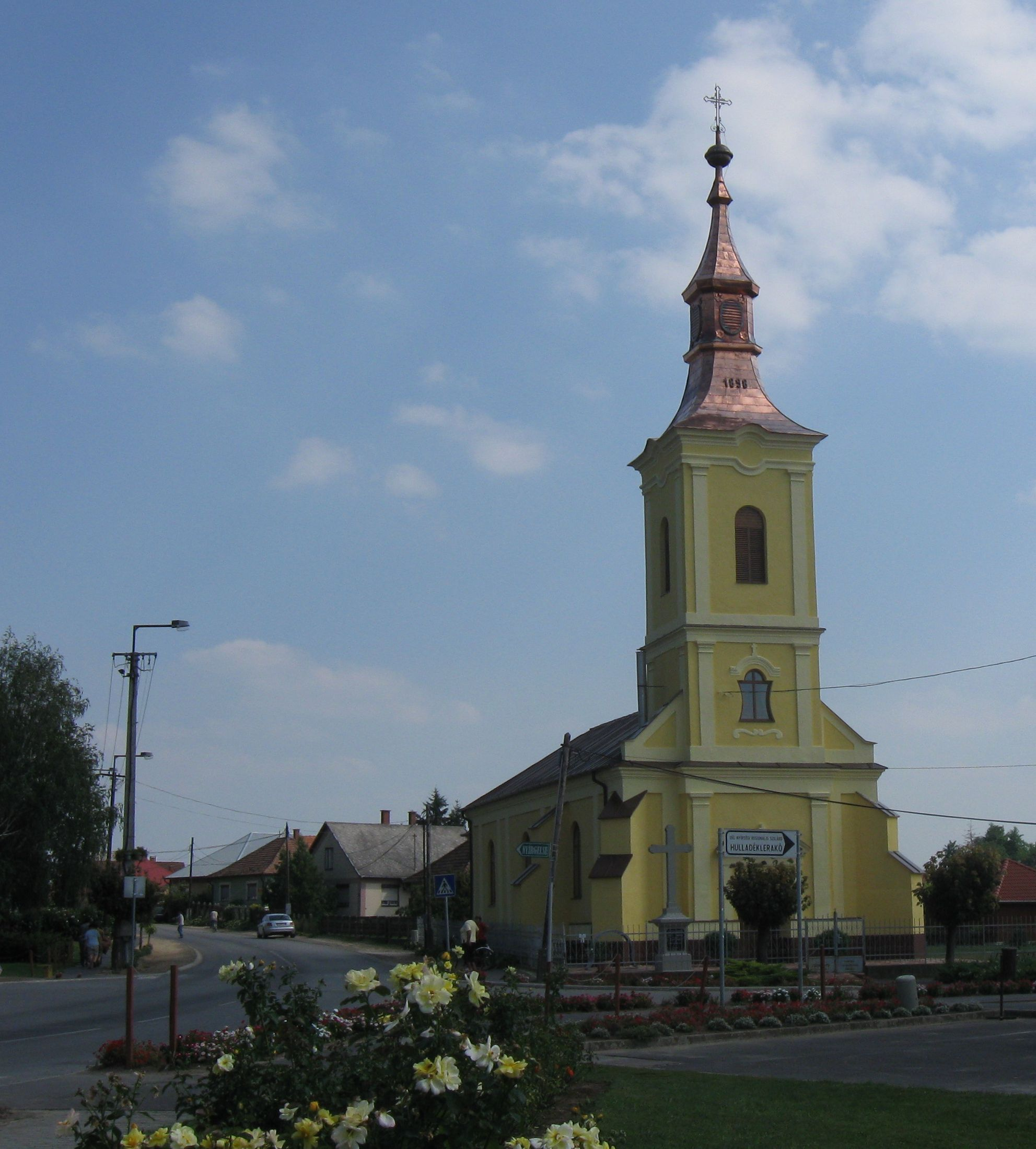
- Greek Catholic Church in Szakoly

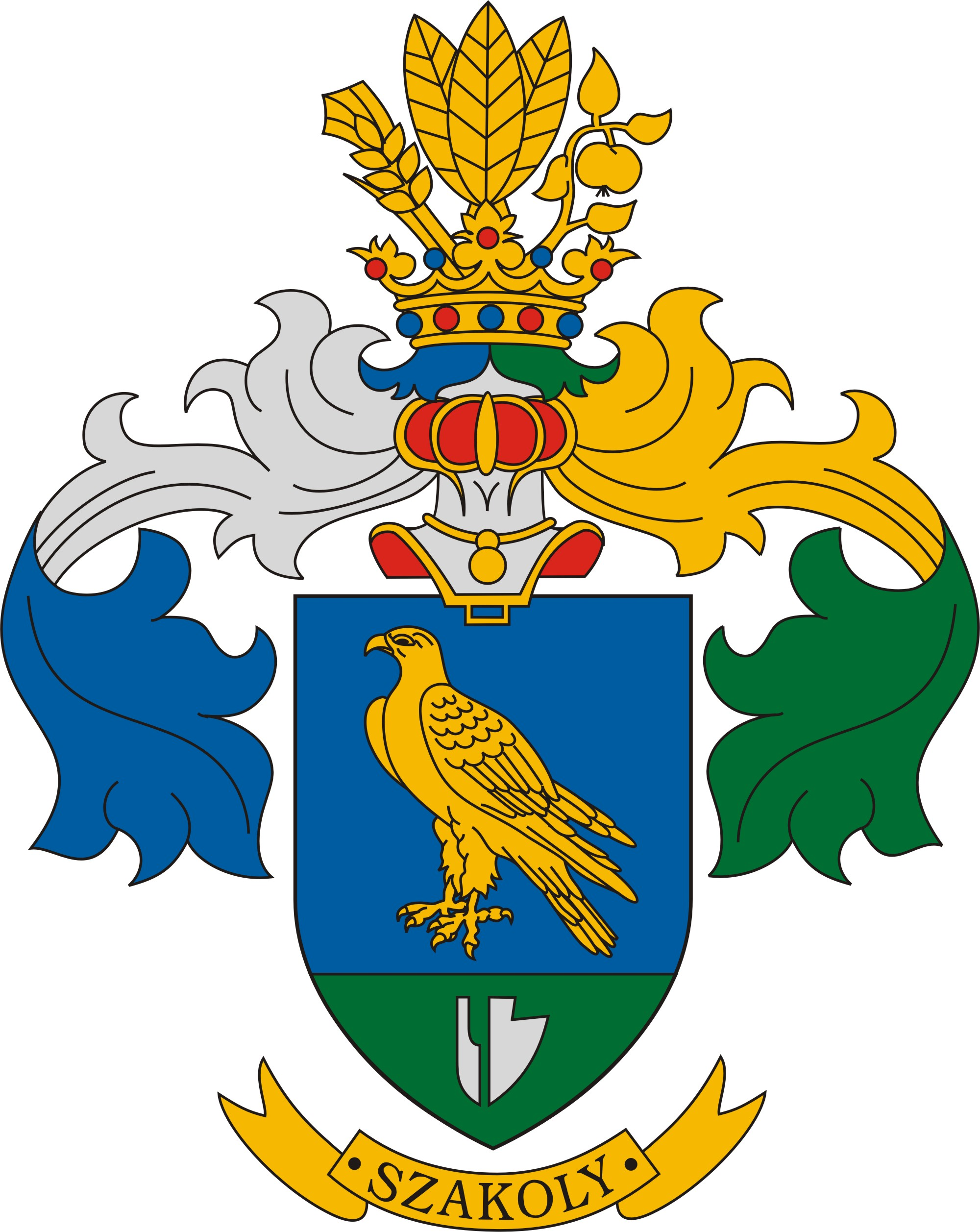
- Coat of arms

- Location of Szakoly in Hungary
- Coordinates: 47.77°N 21.92°E
- Country: Hungary
- Region: Northern Great Plain
- County: Szabolcs-Szatmár-Bereg

Government
  - Mayor: Elizabeth Bacskai (Citizens' Association for Szakoly)

Area
  - Total: 41.44 km^{2} (16.00 sq mi)

Population (2024)
  - Total: 2,539
  - Density: 61.27/km^{2} (158.7/sq mi)
- Time zone: UTC+1 (CET)
  - Summer (DST): UTC+2 (CEST)
- Postal code: 4234
- Area code: +36 42
- Website: http://www.szakoly.hu

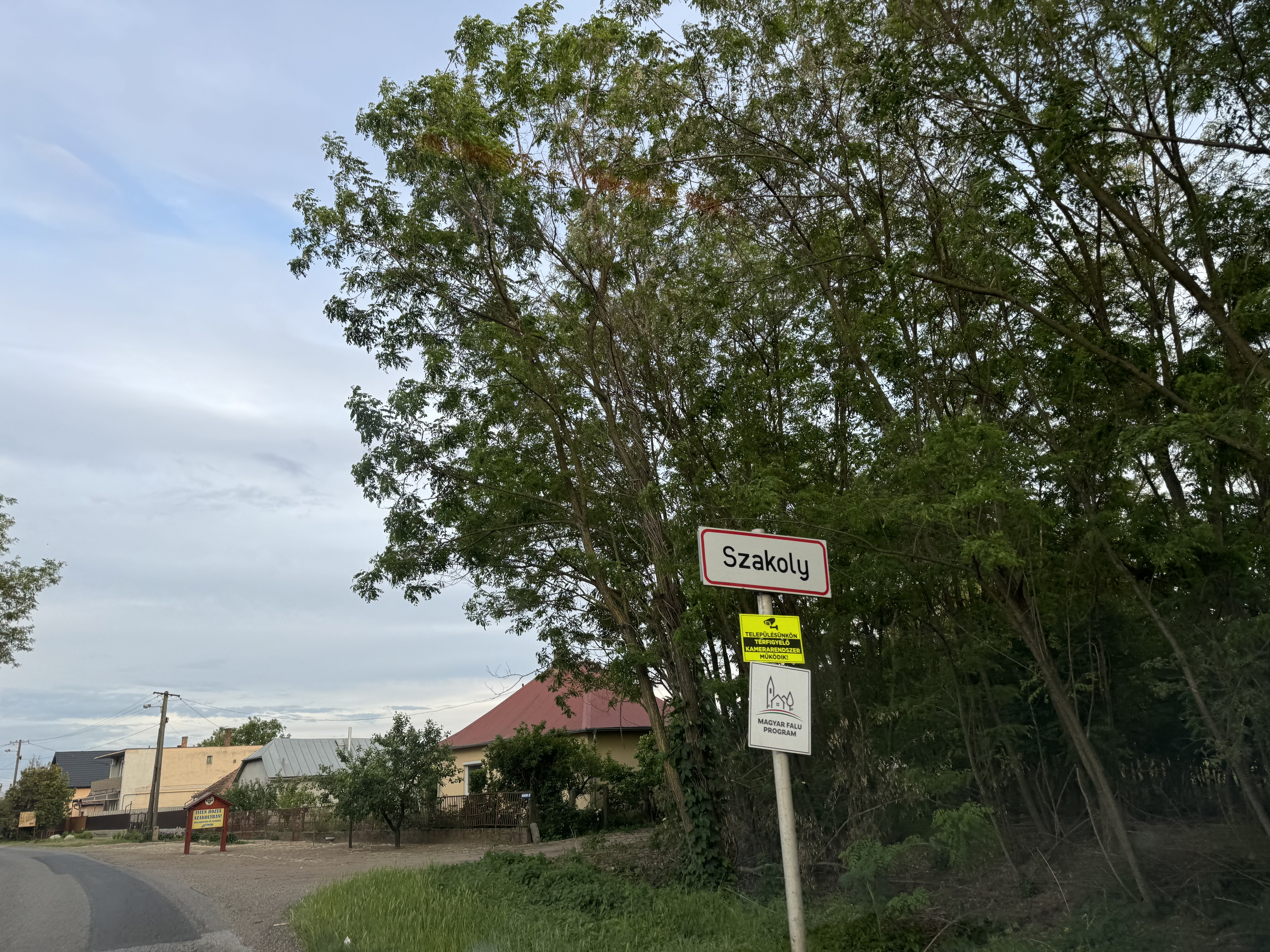
Szakoly, The Edge

Szakoly is a village in Szabolcs-Szatmár-Bereg county, in the Northern Great Plain region of eastern Hungary. It is 135 miles (217 km) to the east of Budapest and 21 miles (34 km) to the north east of Debrecen. It is home to the Szakoly Power Plant. Szakoly was first mentioned in 1290.

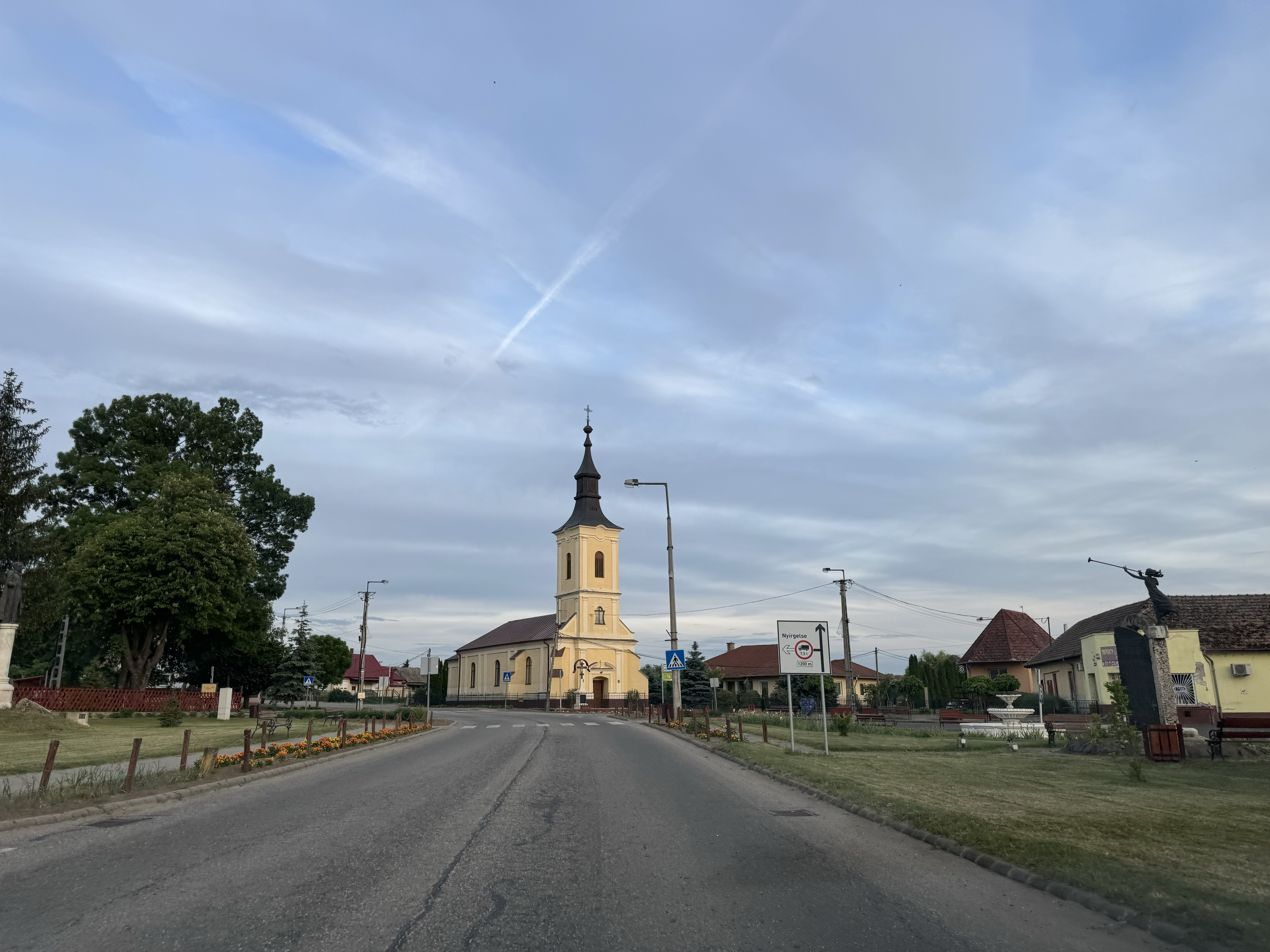
Szakoly, Downtown (Fő tér)

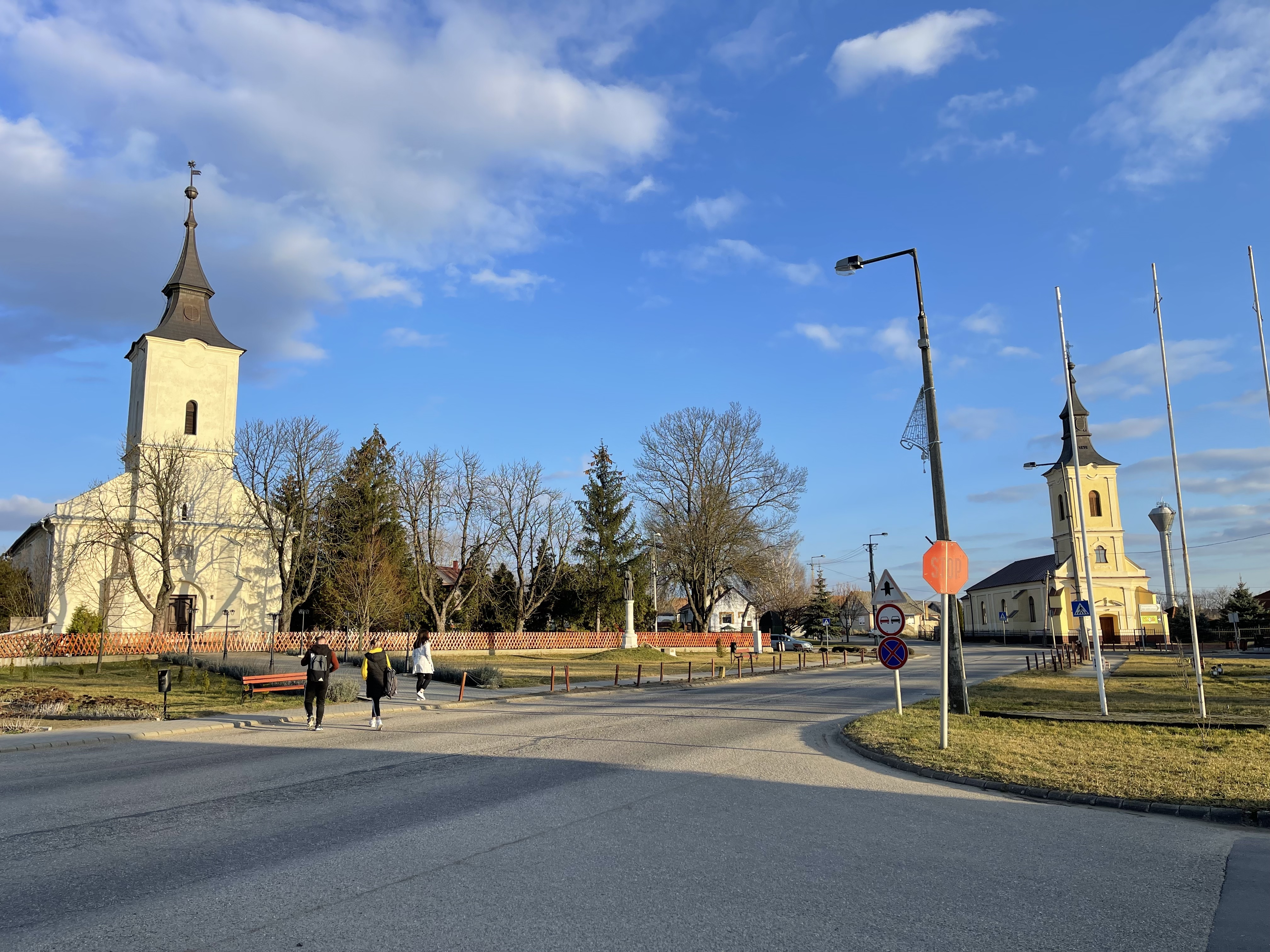
Centrum of Szakoly

== Geography ==
It covers an area of 41.44 km^{2} (16 sq mi) and has a population of 2539 people (2024). There is a lake on the southern border of the settlement.

Average annual precipitation is about 560–590 mm, and the annual average temperature is between 9.5 to 9.6 °C (49.1 to 49.3 °F).

== History ==
Szakoly was first mentioned in 1290.

Inhabited area as early as the Avars age was built by B.C. II.-I. century. This is evidenced by several archaeological finds.

During the reign of King of Bela III. of Hungary, it was a hospital in Szakoly.

Here was a county assembly in 1320.

It were owned by the Zakoly family in 1487, hence the name of the settlement known today.

The Turks almost completely destroyed the settlement in the 18th century. As a border settlement, it was part of the Kingdom of Hungary and the Principality of Transylvania.

Szakoly was annexed to Romania for a year, only to return to Hungary again after the Trianon peace dictatorship in World War II. During the Horthy era, many emigrated to America (USA, Canada).

Szakoly's fire brigade was established in 1992.

Hungary's first greenfield biomass power plant was built here, with a production capacity of 19.8 MW. Operating since 2009, it is now owned and strategically important by the French Veolia Group.

An extremely rare event was observed, aurora borealis in 2024.

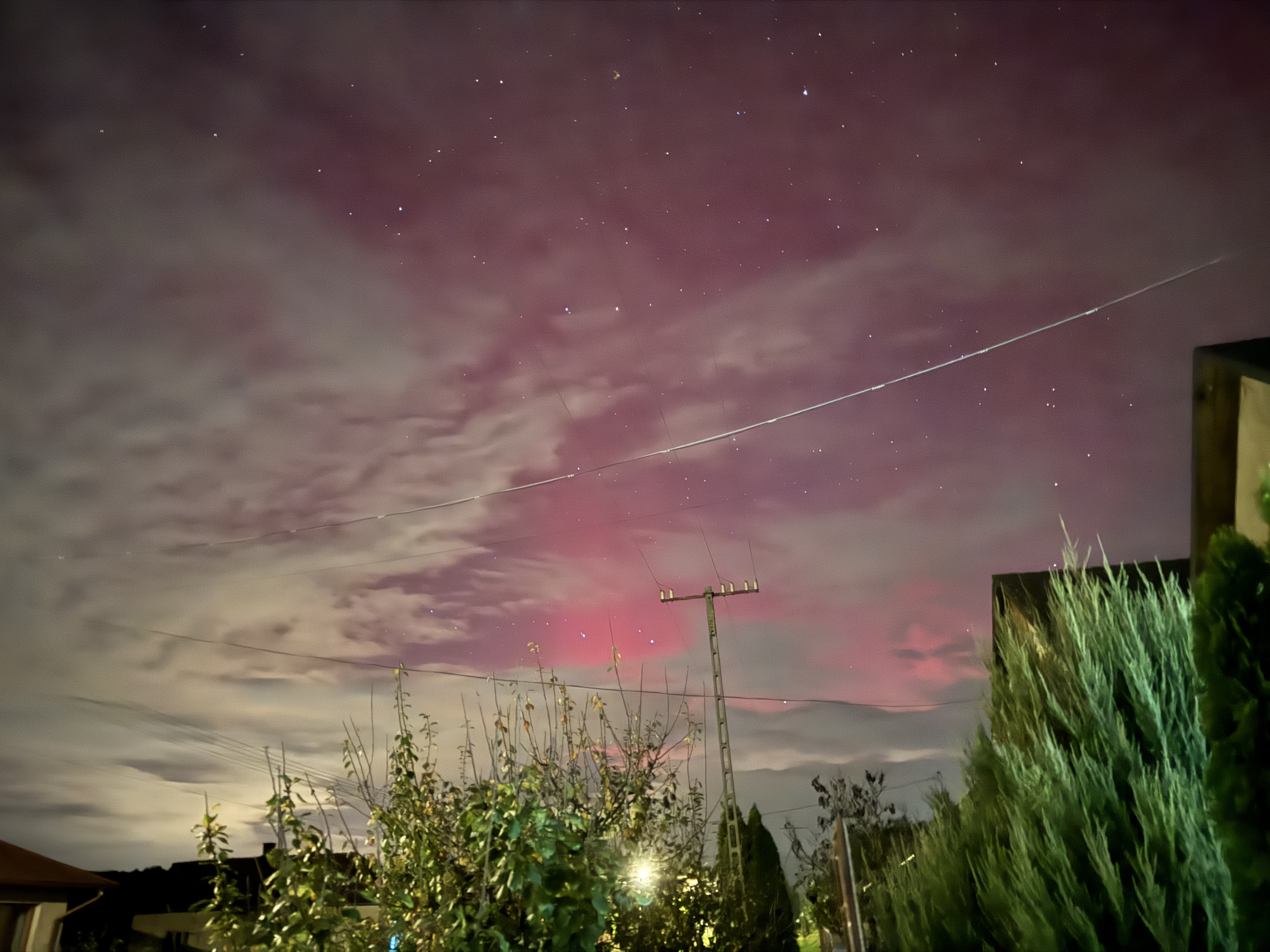
Szakoly, Aurora borealis in 2024

== Economy ==
There is a biomass power plant in the village with a capacity of 19.8 MW. Operating since 2009, it is now owned and strategically important by the French Veolia Group.

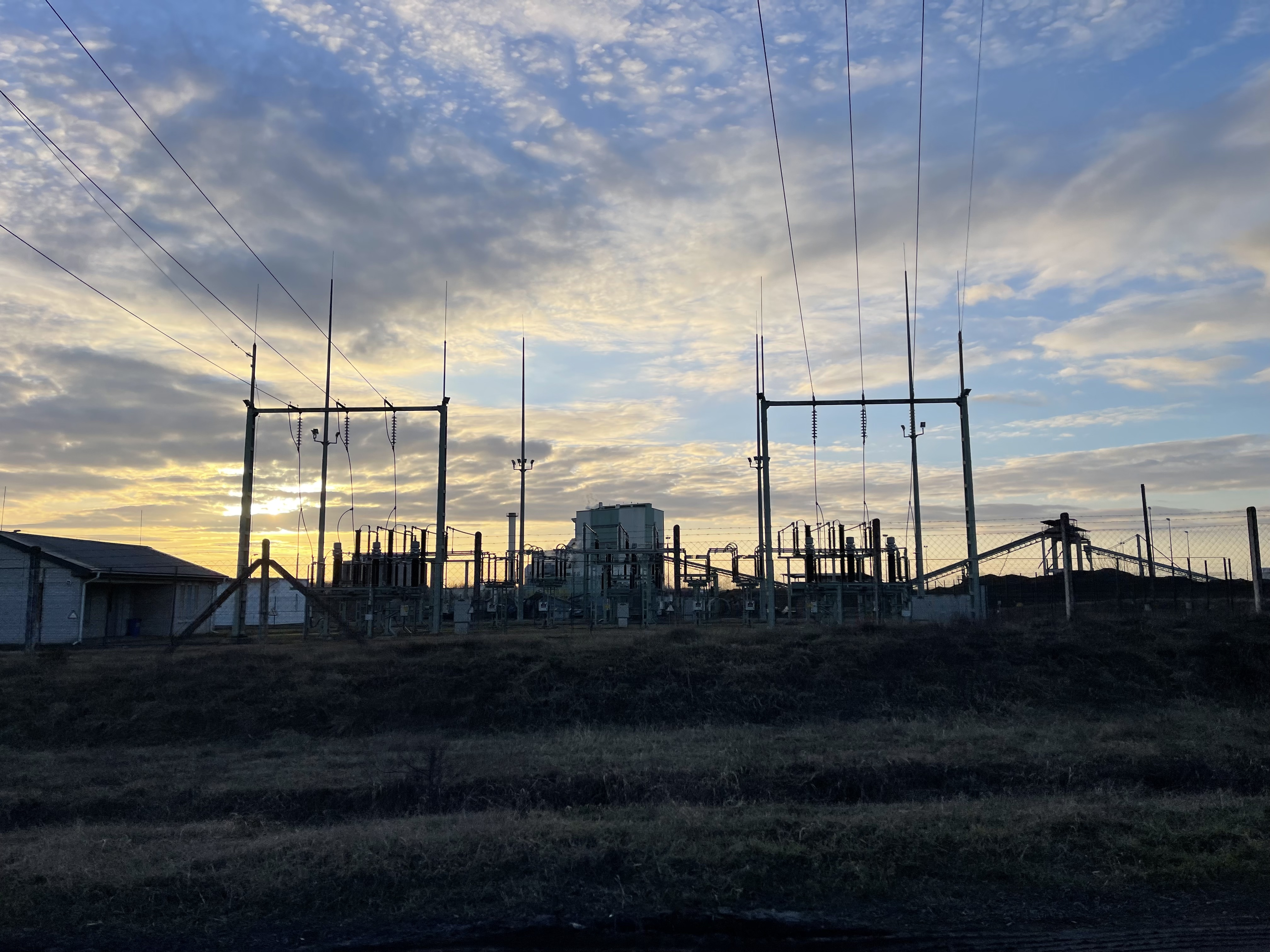
Biomass Power Plant and Transformer in Szakoly

Residents of the village work in the nearby towns industry (Major employers: LEGO, Michelin Tyres, Hübner H Rubber, Jasz Plastic in Nyíregyháza; TEVA Pharmaceutical, Gedeon Richter, BMW, GLOBUS, National Instruments, CATL in Debrecen; Coloplast, Unilever, Rosenberg in Nyirbator) and in agriculture (for example: apple, corn, wheat, melon, tobacco).

There is thermal water (60 °C or 140 °F) under the Szakoly, but it is not utilized.

== Education ==
Arany János Primary School, Vocational School and High School

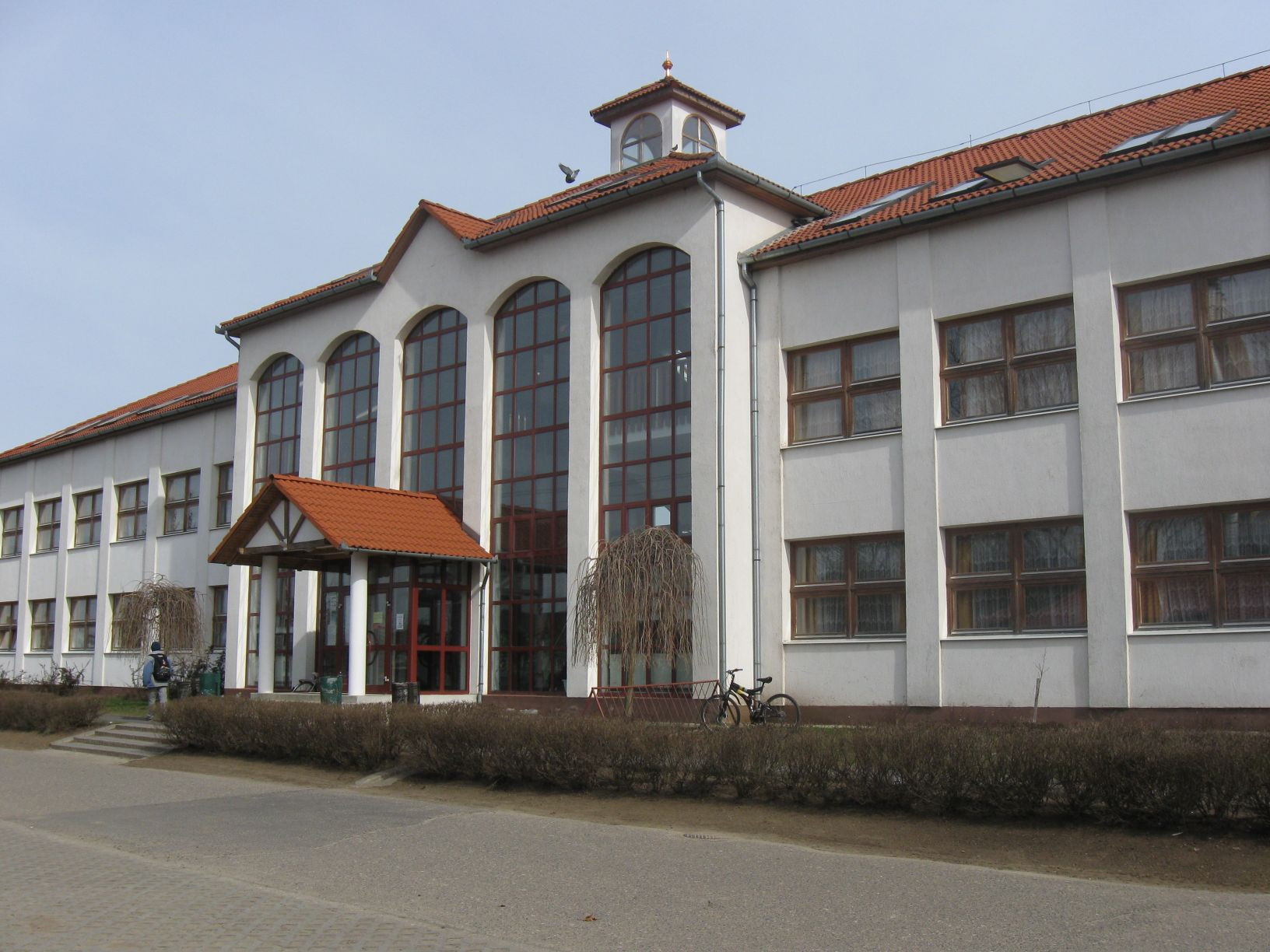
Arany János Primary School, Vocational School and High School

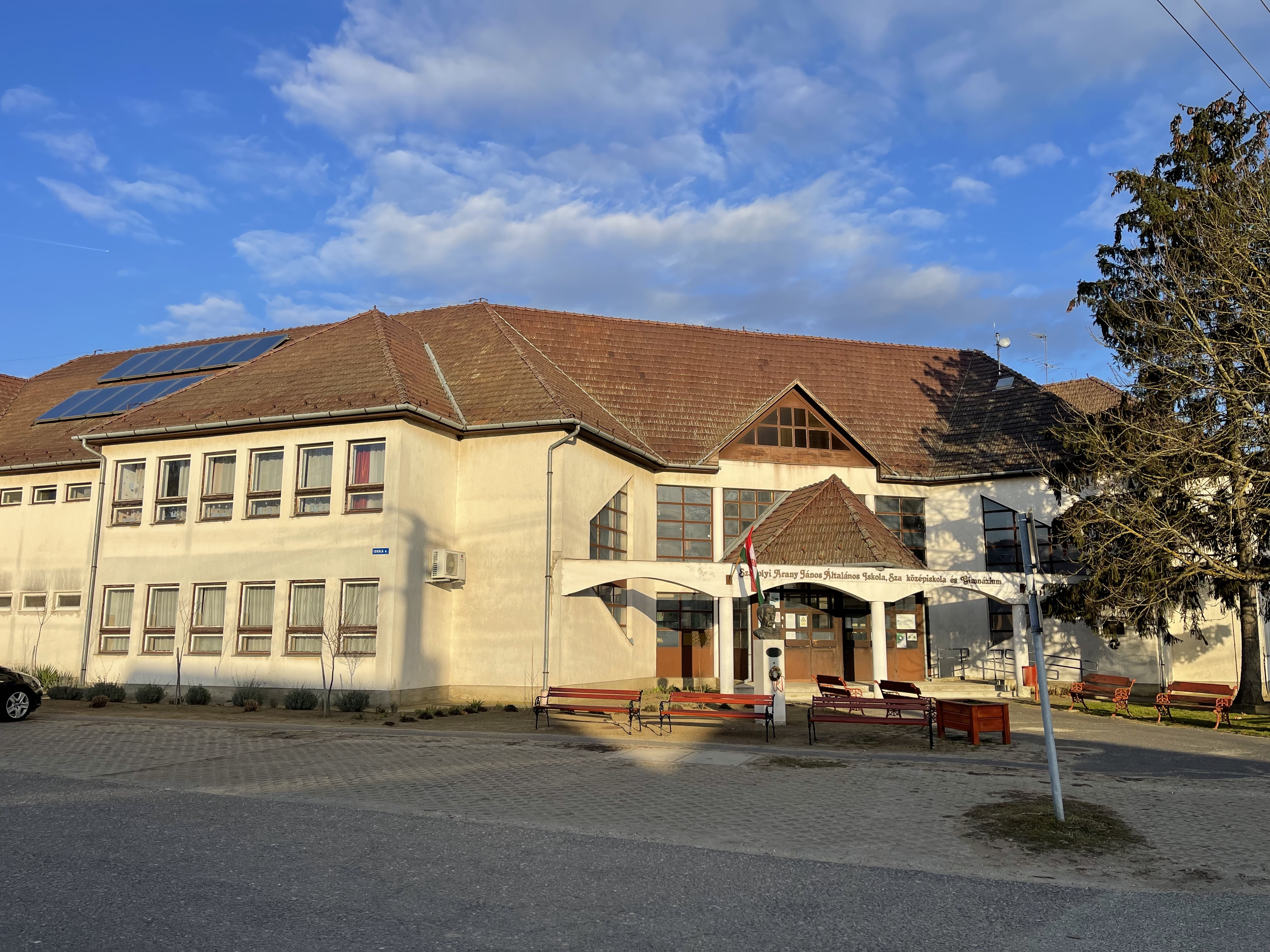
Arany János Primary School, Vocational School and High School

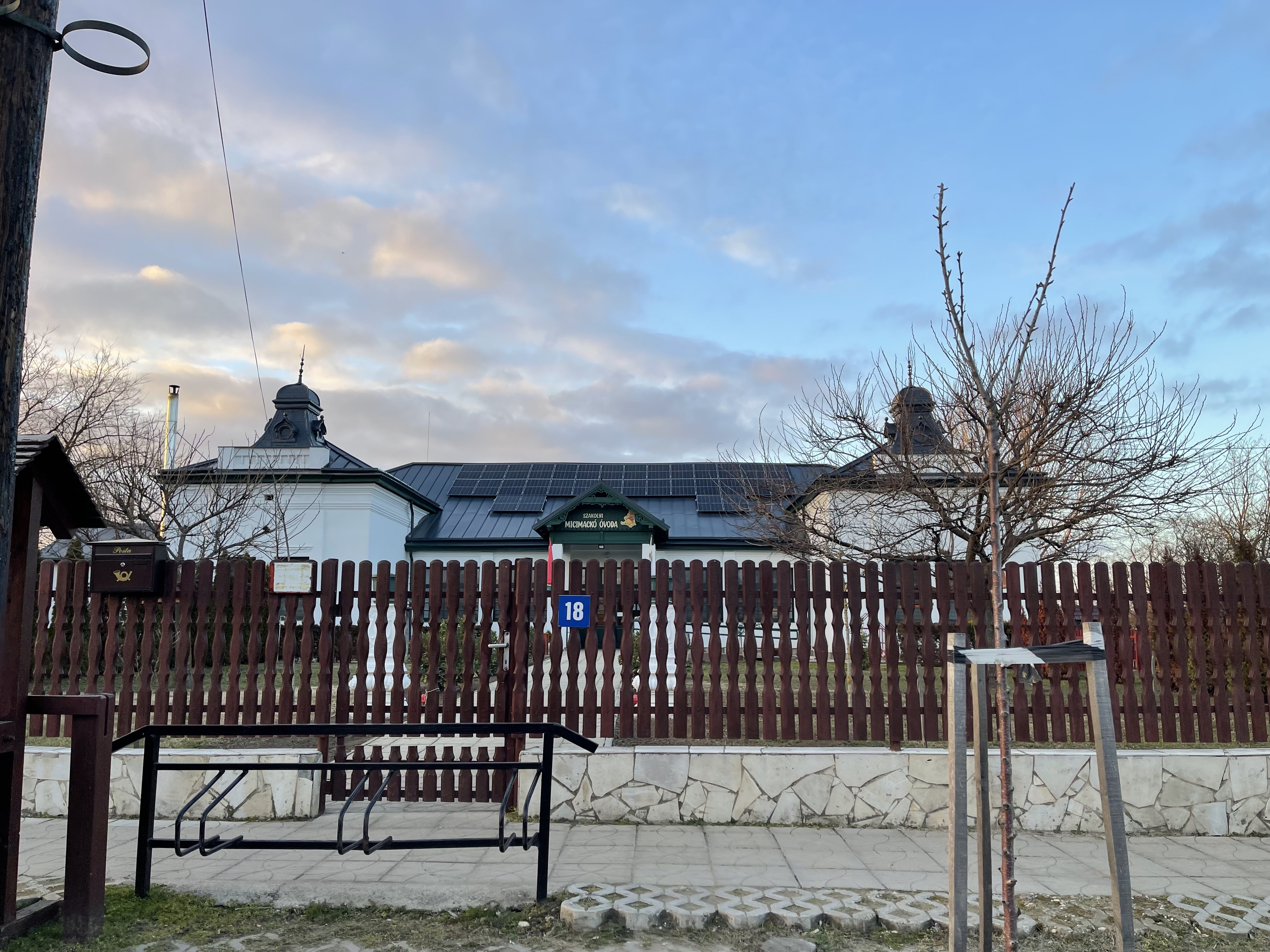
Winnie the Pooh Kindergarten in Szakoly

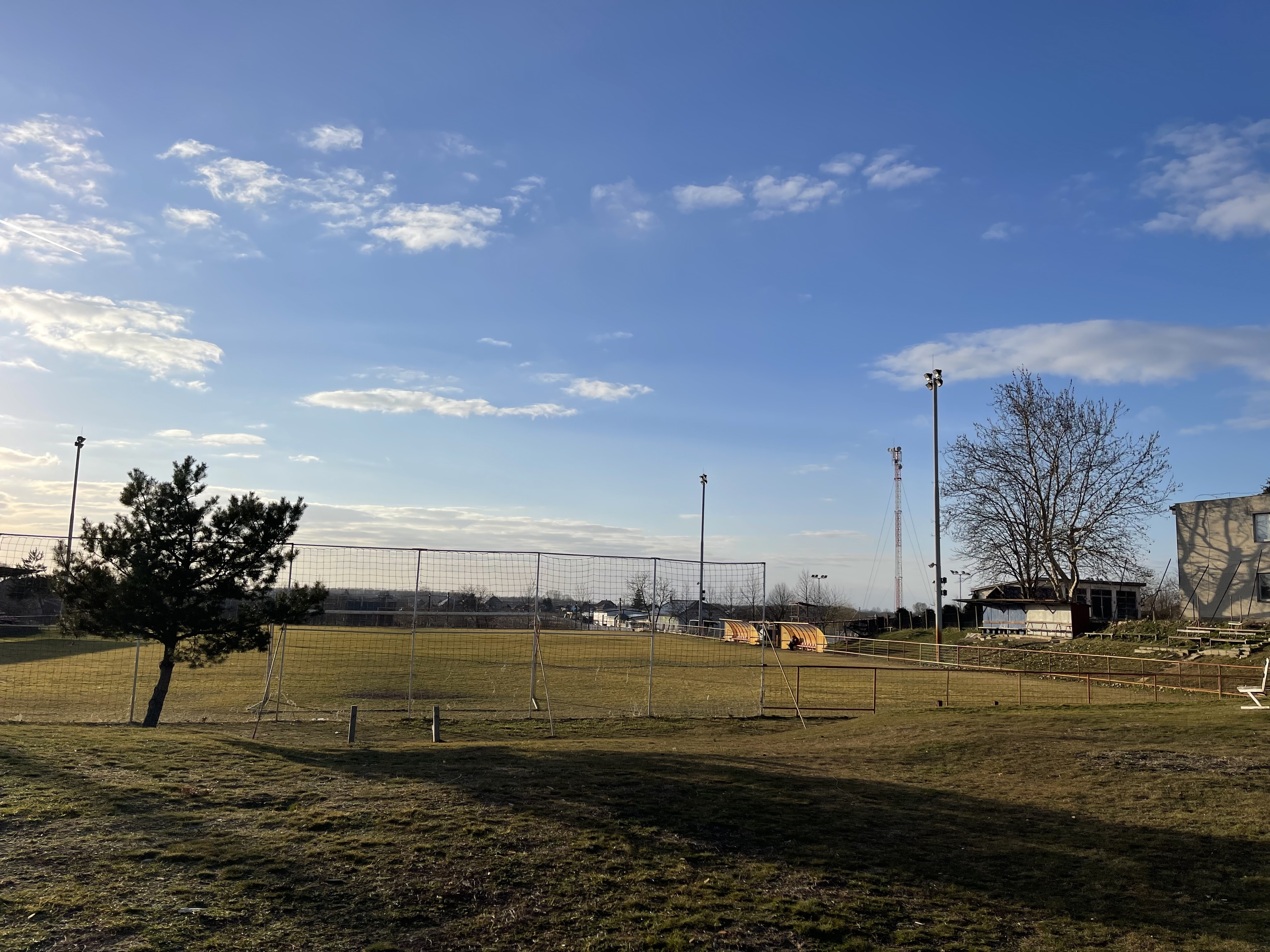
Soccer field in Szakoly

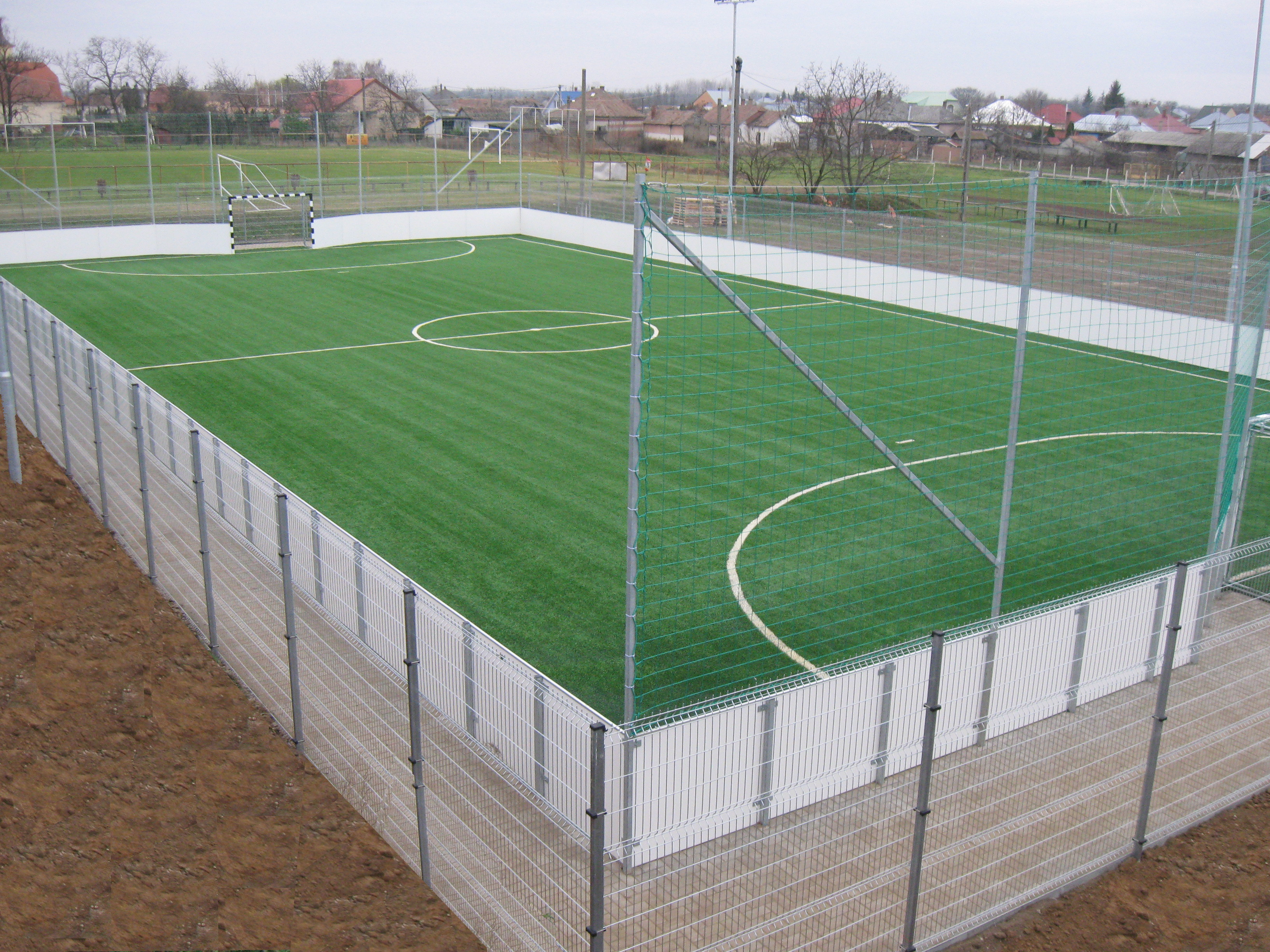
Artificial turf football field

=== Education of the population ===
32% be only primary school

35% must be skilled

25% have a secondary education (grammar school, technical school)

6% have a higher education degree (college, university)

2% to be illiterate

== Religion ==
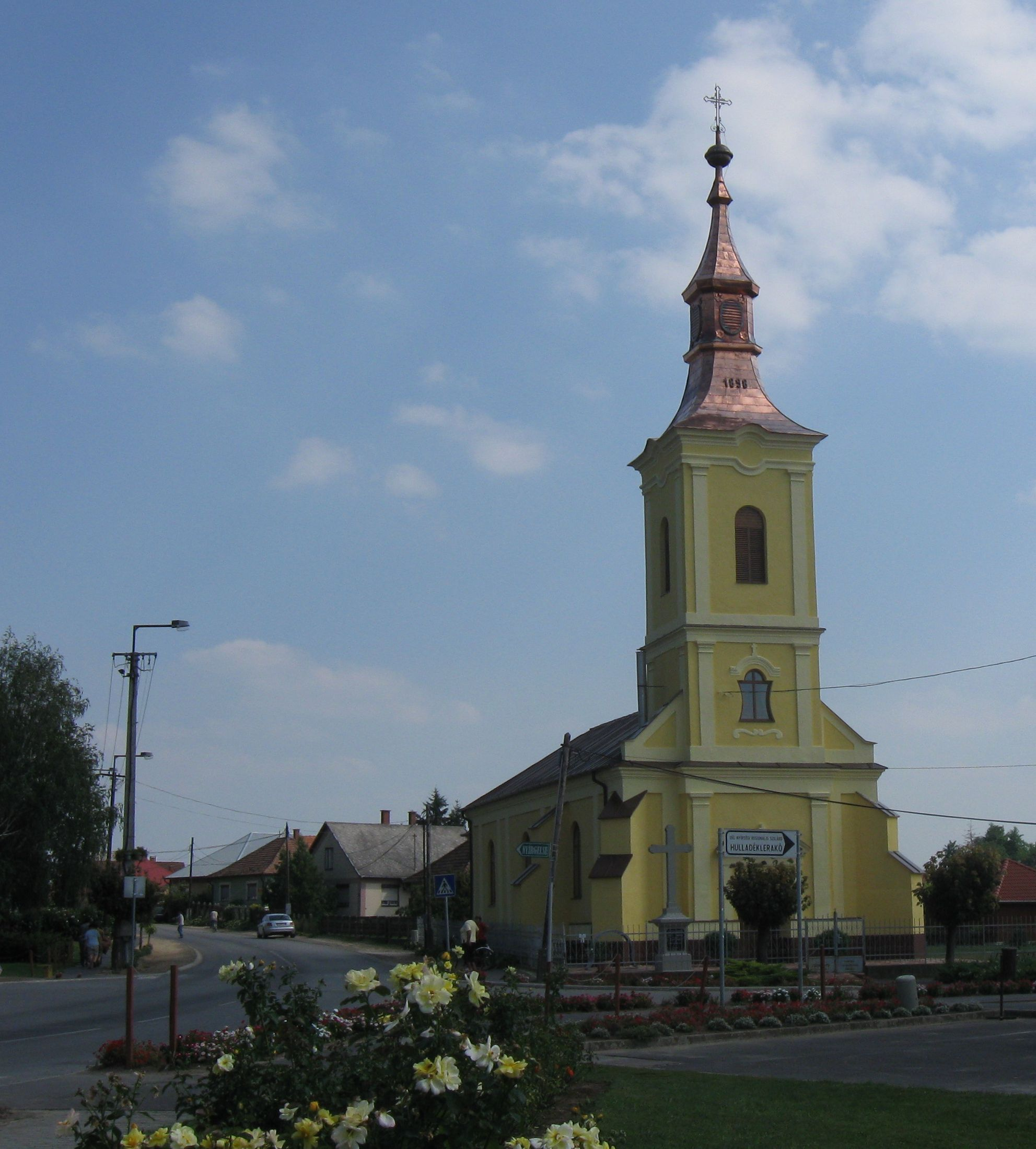
Greek Catholic Church

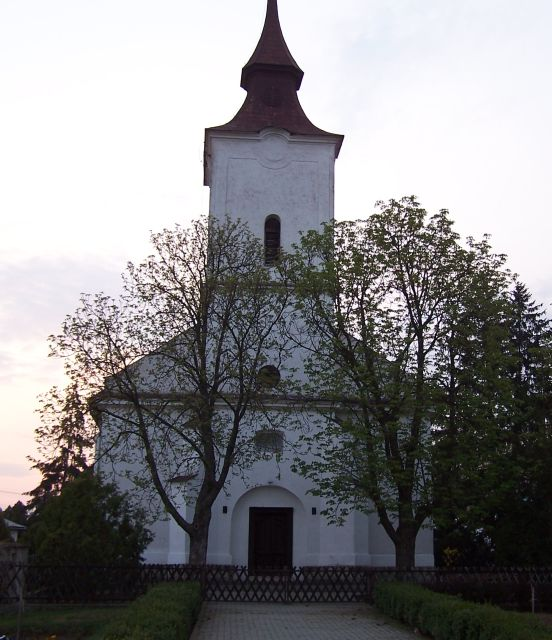
Reformed Church

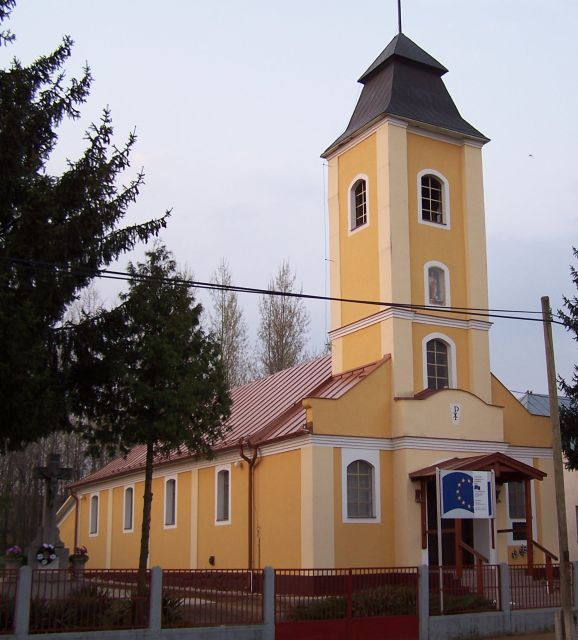
Old Roman Catholic Church (Memory)

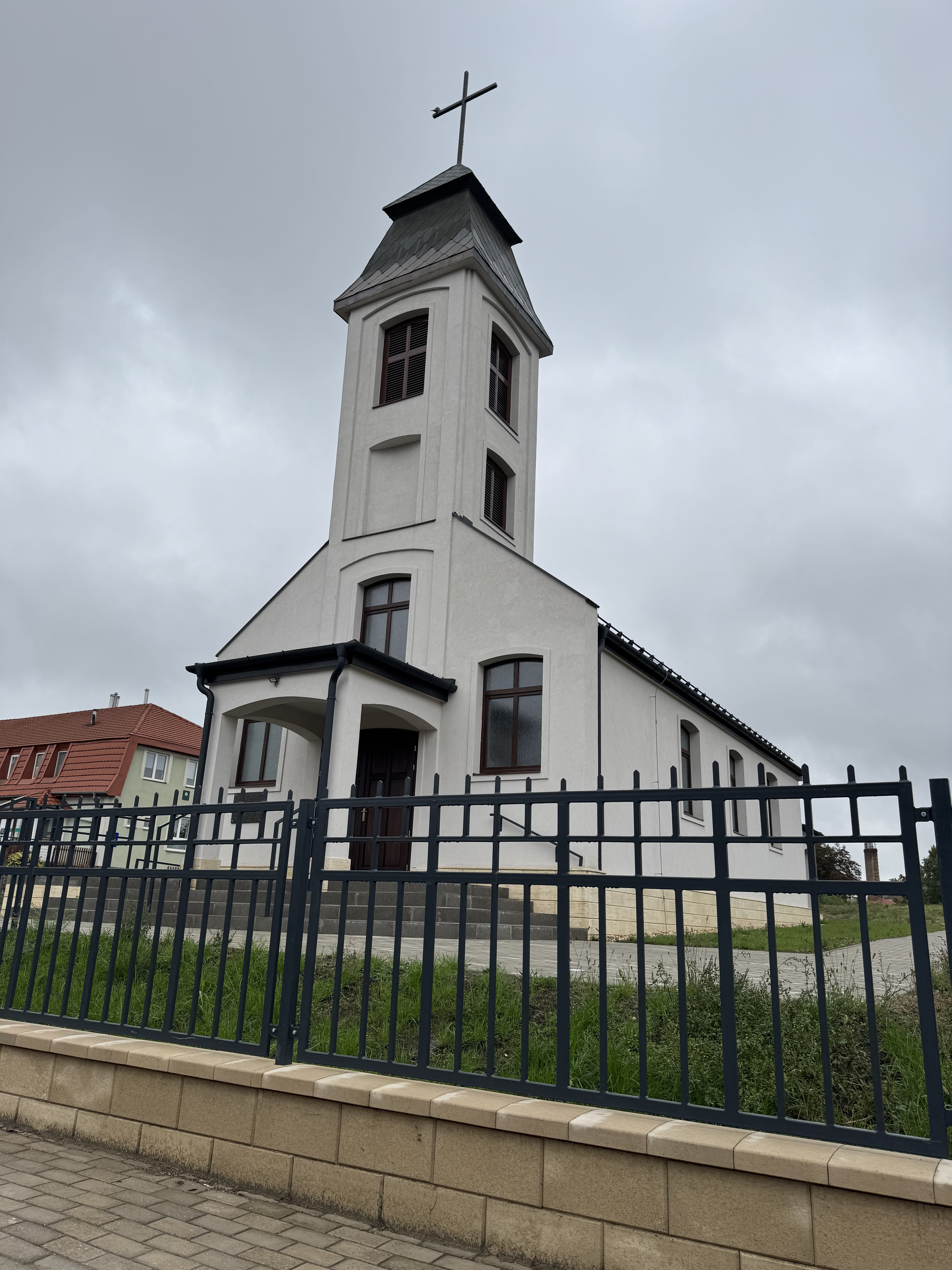
New Roman Catholic Church

== Health Care ==
There is a Health Center in Szakoly, with a family doctor, a pharmacy, and a dentist.

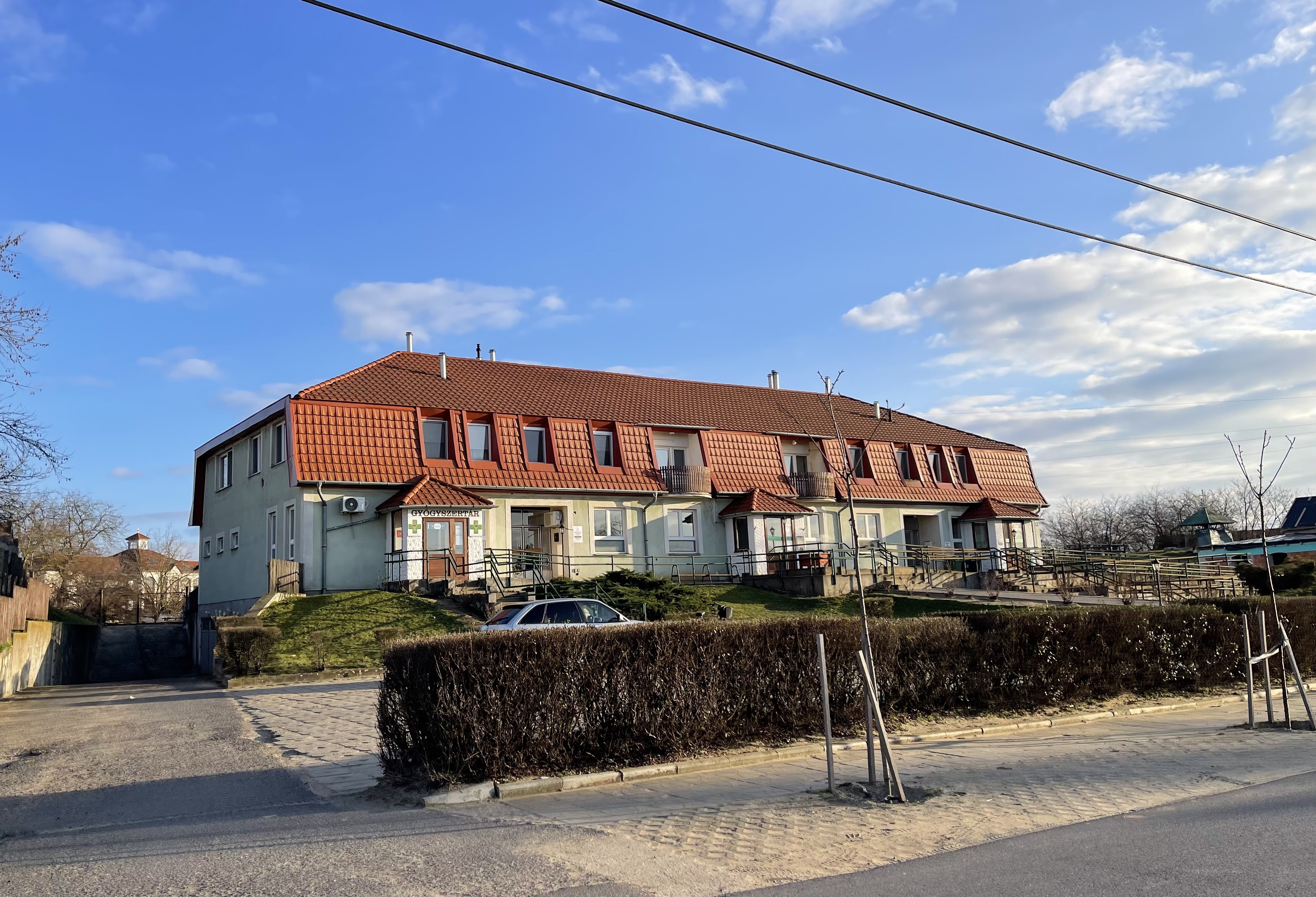
Health Center in Szakoly

== Leisure activities ==
Leisure programs are organized in the Básty Garden. There is also a riding stable.

More important events, for example May Day (May 1.), Corn Festival (in August), Harvest Festival (in October), Tractor Parade (in December).

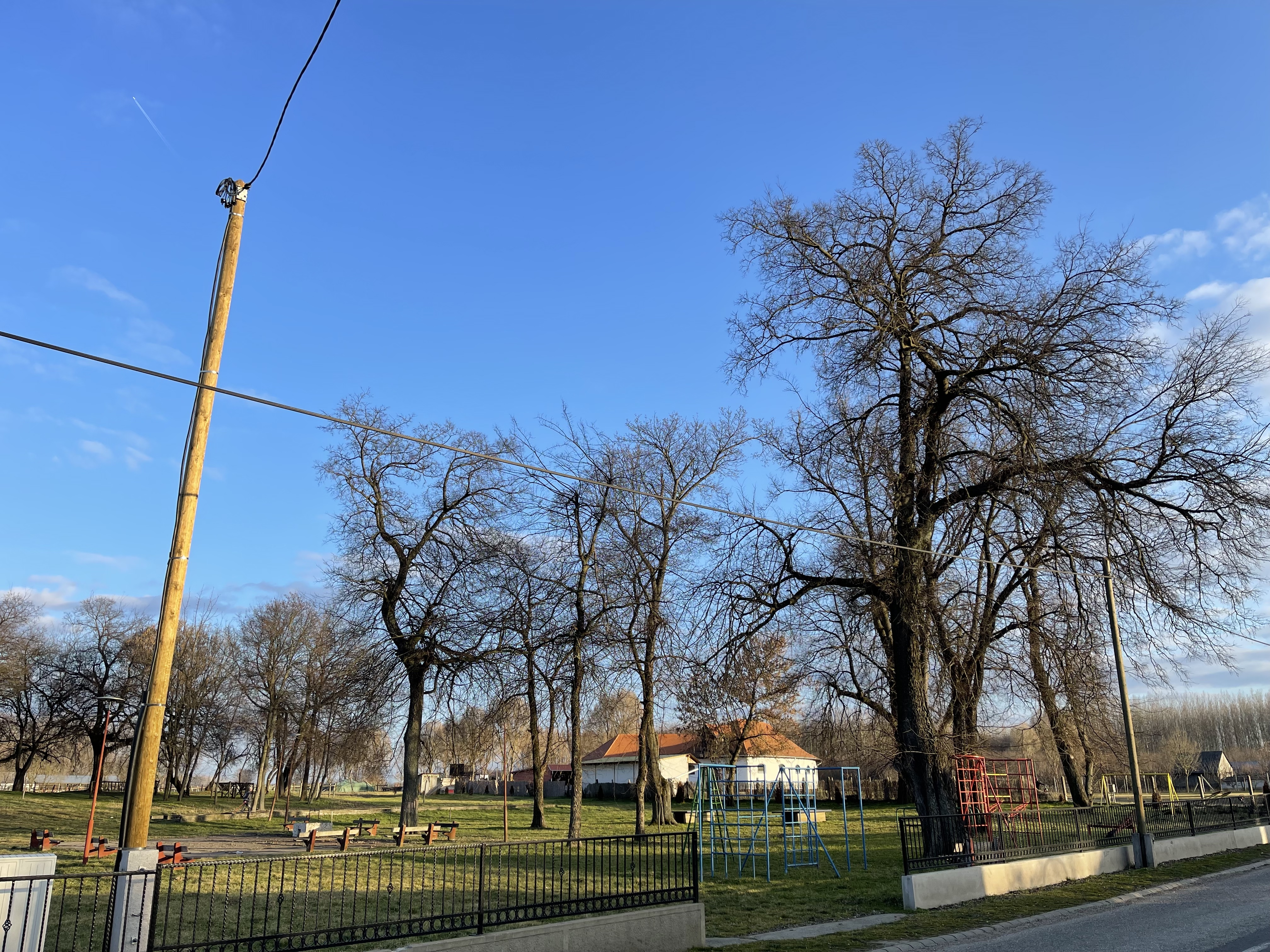
Basty Garden

== Cultural values ==
- The Women's Choir of the Dawn Star Pensioners' Club
- Szakoly shot the video clip for the song Nyughatlatan, Jaj... in the village of Szakoly

=== Historical memories of Szakoly ===
- In 1978, a lot of silver coins from the 16th century and Neolithic vessels were found in the Szakoly area.
- Later, a 17th-century coconut goblet was found in the reformed church in Szakoly, which is currently kept in the collection of the Debrecen Reformed Church College.
- In 2007, during the construction of the biomass power plant, Roman-Celtic masks, objects, Greek-Macedonian silver and gold treasures, clay objects, skeletons, as well as Celtic minted silver and cast coins were found on Kígyós-rét (Bábarét). The treasures found are all locked up to this day. The finds are kept in the Józsa András Museum in Nyíregyháza, and it is not possible to view them, as they are strictly confidential. Based on these finds, however, it can be assumed that the settlement was already in the II-I BC. it was also inhabited in the century.

== Sister cities ==
Ardud, Romania

Orosi, Slovakia

== Common surnames in the settlement ==
Elek, Győri, Kiss, Kovács, Módis, Nagy, Szabó, Szűcs, Tóth, Vadon, Papp

There are three Christian cemeteries in the settlement, but only one is in active use, the others can only be visited.

=== Common surnames in the settlement ===
Weisz, Lichtmann, Reizmann, Rozinger

There is also an old Jewish cemetery in the settlement, but it has not been used or taken care of for a long time.

== Famous people ==
Peter Parthenius - bishop (1592.)

Zsigmond Móricz - novelist and Social Realist (1898.)

János Szilágyi - Founder of Szakolyért Bárati Klub (1930.)

Tihamér Kiss - Szakoly's private doctor, composer (pseudonym Tihamér Dalnoki: published numerous musical compositions) (1937.)
