= Ladislaus Szalkai =

Hungarian bishop, treasurer and chancellor

László Szalkai
- Archbishop of Esztergom
- Church: Catholic Church
- Archdiocese: Archdiocese of Esztergom
- In office: 6 May 1524 – 29 August 1526
- Predecessor: George Szatmári
- Successor: Várdai Pál
- Previous posts: Bishop of Eger (1523-1524); Bishop of Vác (1515-1523)

Orders
- Consecration: 16 April 1525 by Lorenzo Campeggio

Personal details
- Born: 1475 Mátészalka, Bereg County, Kingdom of Hungary
- Died: 29 August 1526 (aged 50–51) Mohács, Baranya County, Kingdom of Hungary

Ladislaus or László Szalkai (1475-1526) was a Hungarian bishop, treasurer and chancellor.

== Life ==
The son of a shoemaker from Mátészalka, he worked in the royal court from 1494, initially as a treasurer then as one of the royal secretaries. He was bishop of Vac (1513-1522), bishop of Eger (1524-1526), the archbishop of Esztergom (1524-1526) and primate of Hungary (from 1525). In the meantime he acted as royal treasurer (1516-1526) and chancellor (1518-1526). He was killed at the battle of Mohács.
