= Szakoly Power Plant =

Biomass power plant

- Country: Hungary
- Location: Szakoly, Szabolcs-Szatmár-Bereg County
- Coordinates: 47.7377°N 21.9080°E
- Status: Operational
- Commission date: 2008
- Owner: Tohoku Electric Power

Thermal power station
- Primary fuel: Biomass

Power generation
- Nameplate capacity: 20 MW

The Szakoly Power Plant is one of Hungary's largest biomass power plants having an installed electric capacity of 20 MW.
