= Tamás Bakócz =

Hungarian archbishop and statesman (1442–1521)

His Eminence Tamás Bakócz
- Cardinal; Archbishop of Esztergom; Primate of Hungary
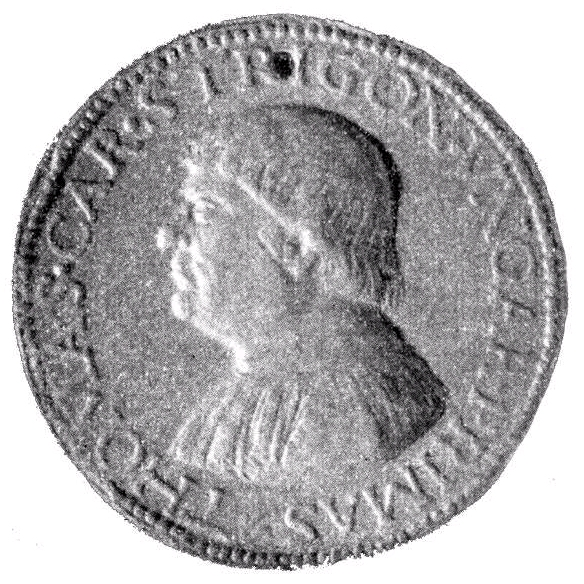
- Province: Esztergom
- See: Esztergom
- Appointed: 1497
- Installed: 1497
- Predecessor: Ippolito d'Este
- Successor: George Szatmári
- Other post: Latin Patriarch of Constantinople
- Previous posts: Bishop of Győr (1487–1493); Bishop of Eger (1497)

Orders
- Consecration: 1497 by Pope Alexander VI
- Created cardinal: 1500 by Pope Alexander VI
- Rank: Cardinal-Priest

Personal details
- Born: Tamás Bakócz; 1442 Erdőd, Hungary (modern Ardud, Romania)
- Died: 15 June 1521 (aged 79) Esztergom, Hungary
- Buried: Esztergom Basilica
- Denomination: Catholicism
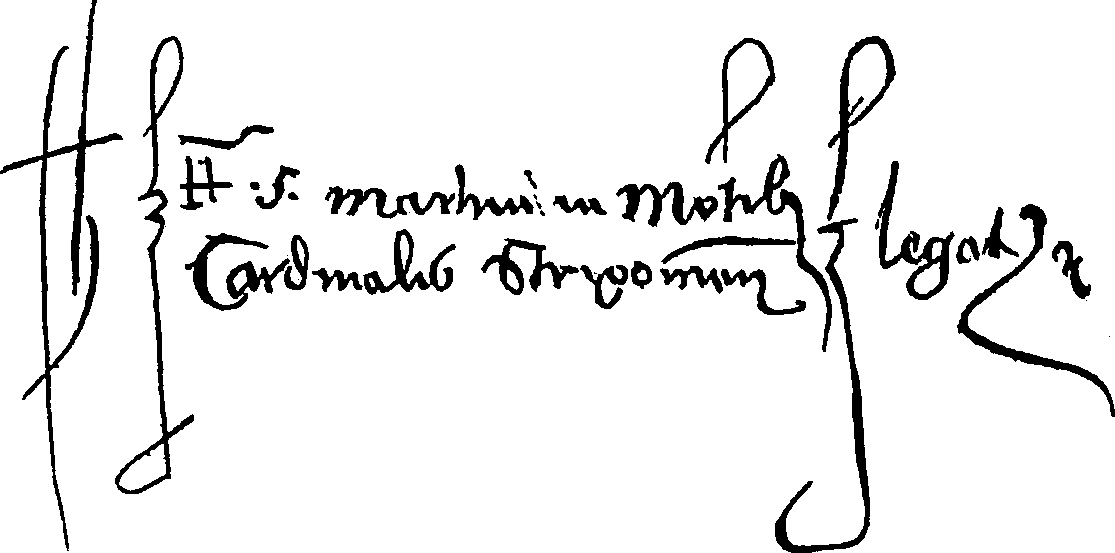
- Signature

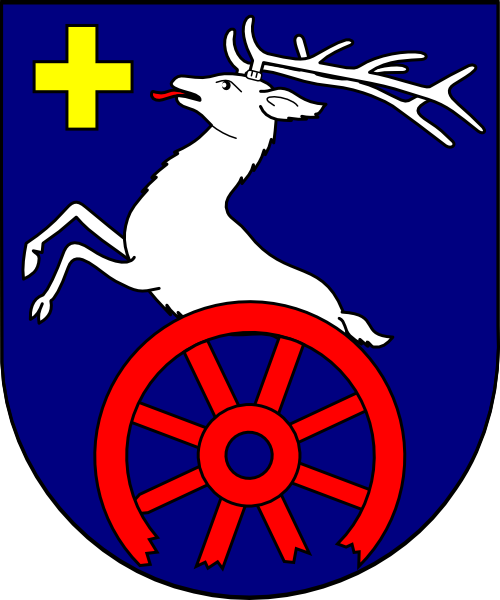
- Coat of arms

Tamás Bakócz OP (Croatian: Toma Bakač; also spelled Bakoch and sometimes given the toponymic element Erdődy; b. 1442 – d. 1521) was a Hungarian archbishop, cardinal and statesman. He was a serious candidate for the 1513 papal conclave.

== Life ==
Born in Erdőd (Erdeed, Ardud), a Transylvanian village now part of Romania, Bakócz was the son of a wagoner and was adopted by his uncle, who trained him for the priesthood and whom he succeeded as rector of Tétel (1480). Through the generosity of his same brother Valentine, he was able to pursue a thorough course of studies first in the town of Szatmár-Németi, then in Kraków, Poland, and finally in the Italian cities of Ferrara and Padua.

He returned to his native country about the year 1470, with the doctor's degree. Bakócz was introduced to the king about the year 1474. Shortly afterwards he became one of the secretaries of King Matthias Corvinus, who made him bishop of Győr and a member of the royal council (1490). Under Vladislaus II of Bohemia and Hungary (1490–1516) he became successively bishop of Eger, the richest of the Hungarian sees, archbishop of Esztergom (1497), cardinal (1500), and titular Latin Patriarch of Constantinople (1510).

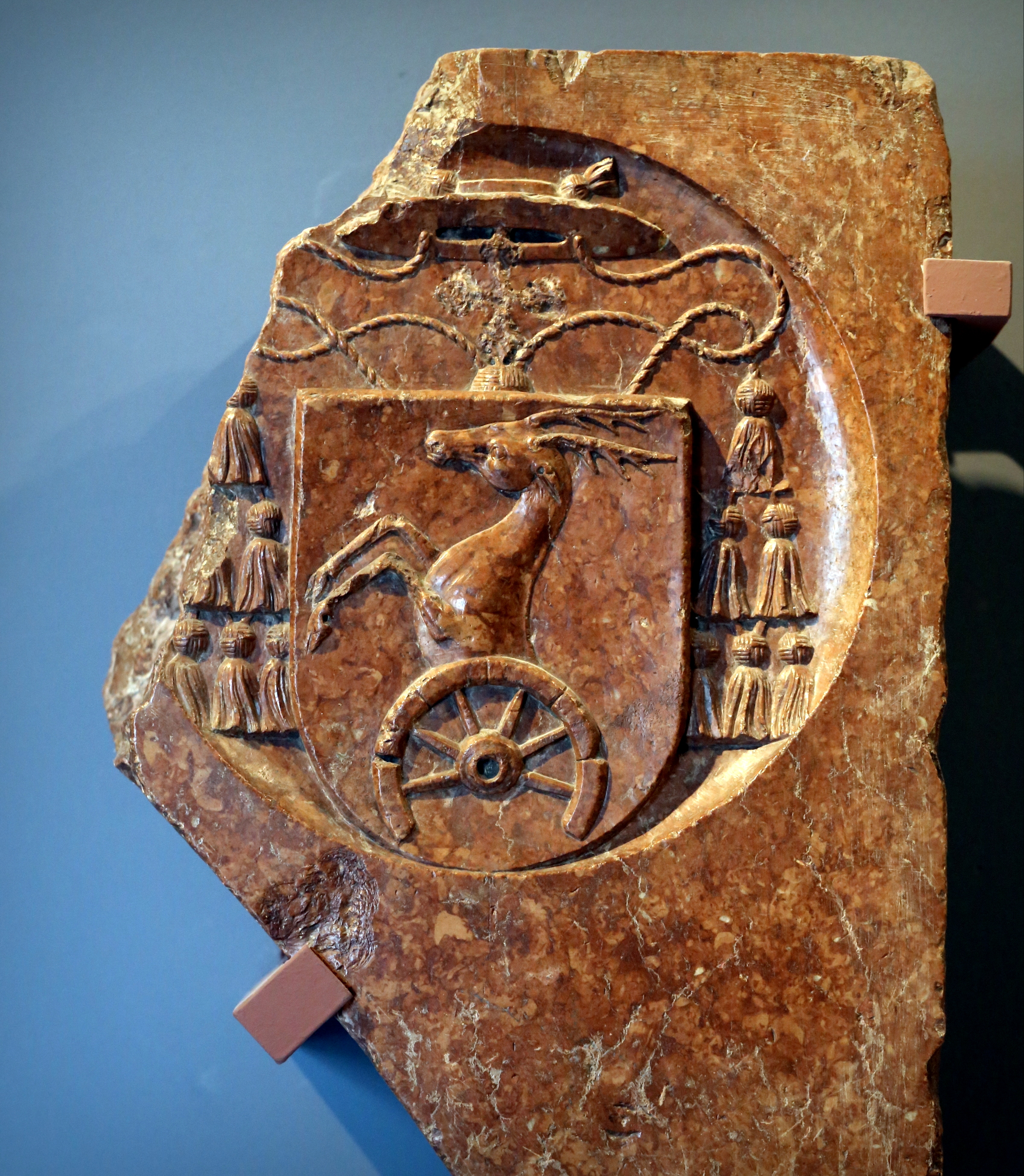
The coat of arms of Tamás Bakócz

From 1490 to his death in 1521 he was the leading statesman of Hungary and mainly responsible for foreign policy. It was solely through his efforts that Hungary did not accede to the league of Cambrai, was consistently friendly with Venice, and formed a family compact with the Habsburgs. He was also the only Magyar prelate who seriously aspired to the papal throne. In 1513, on the death of Julius II, he went to Rome for the express purpose of bringing about his own election as pope. He was received with more than princely pomp, and almost succeeded in his design, thanks to his extraordinary adroitness and the command of an almost unlimited bribing-fund. But Venice and the emperor played him false, and he failed.

He returned to Hungary as papal legate, bringing with him the bull of Leo X proclaiming a fresh crusade against the Turks. But the crusade degenerated into a jacquerie which ravaged the whole kingdom, and much discredited Bakócz. He lost some of his influence at first after the death of Wladislaus, but continued to be the guiding spirit at court, till age and infirmity confined him almost entirely to his house in the last three years of his life. He left a fortune of many millions.

He and his family are buried in a separate chapel of the Esztergom Basilica, the most precious artwork of the Hungarian Renaissance.

== See also ==
- Péter Erdő another Hungarian serious candidate in the 2025 papal conclave

== Sources ==
- Fraknói, Vilmos (1889). Tamás Bakócz (in Hungarian). Budapest.

Catholic Church titles
Preceded by Matthias Corvinus	Commendator of Pannonhalma Archabbey; 1490–1492	Succeeded by Vladislaus II
Preceded by Ippolito d'Este	Archbishop of Esztergom; 20 December 1497 – 16 June 1521	Succeeded by George Szatmári
Preceded by Marco Cornaro	— TITULAR — Latin Patriarch of Constantinople; 30 October 1507 – 16 June 1521	Succeeded by Marco Cornaro
Records
Preceded by Francisco Jiménez de Cisneros	Oldest living Member of the Sacred College; 8 November 1517 - 11 June 1521	Succeeded by Domenico Giacobazzi
