= Bartholomew Drágfi =

15th-century Transylvanian nobleman

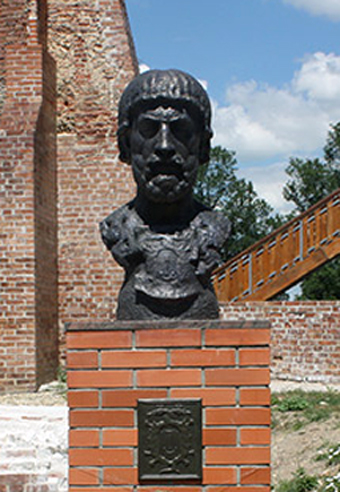

Voivode of Transylvania
- Reign: 1493 - 1499
- Predecessor: Stephen V Báthory
- Successor: Peter Szentgyörgyi
- Native name: Bertalan Drágffy
- Born: 1447
- Died: 1501 (aged 53–54)
- Noble family: Drágfi
- Spouse: Dorottya Hédervári de Hédervár
- Issue: John Drágfi
- Father: Nicholas Drágfi
- Mother: Afra Jakcs

Bartholomew Drágfi de Béltek (Hungarian: bélteki Drágffy Bertalan, Romanian: Bartolomeu Dragfi) b. 1447 – d. 1501) was Voivode of Transylvania from 1493 until 1499, Count of the Székelys from 1479 until 1488, Comes Perpetuus of Middle Szolnok. He was a member of the House of Dragoș and a descendant of Dragoș, Voivode of Moldavia.

== Voivode of Transylvania ==
Bartholomew Drágfi was appointed voivode of Transylvania in 1493. Until 1495, another Transylvanian voivode ruled alongside Ladislaus Losonci. As a voivode, he supported Stephen III of Moldavia, in 1497 against John I Albert, king of Poland.

== Sources ==
- Joódy Pál - Cercetarea calitắții de nobil in comitatul Maramures. Anii 1749-1769, Editura societắții culturale Pro Maramures "Dragos Vodắ", Cluj-Napoca, 2003
- Joan cavaler de Puscariu - Date istorice privitoare la familiile nobile romắne. Editura societắții culturale Pro Maramures "Dragos Vodắ", Cluj-Napoca, 2003
- Prof. Alexandru Filipascu de Dolha si Petrova - Istoria Maramuresului, Editura "Gutinul" Baia Mare, 1997.
- Wyrostek, Ludwik - Rod Dragow-Sasow na Wegrzech i Rusi Halickiej. RTH t. XI/1931-1932

Bartholomew Drágfi House of Dragoș Born: 1447 Died: 1501
Political offices
Preceded by Stephen V Báthory	Voivode of Transylvania; 1493–1499	Succeeded by Peter Szentgyörgyi
Preceded by Imre Hédervári	Count of the Székelys; 1479–1488	Succeeded by -
