= Ardud =

- Town
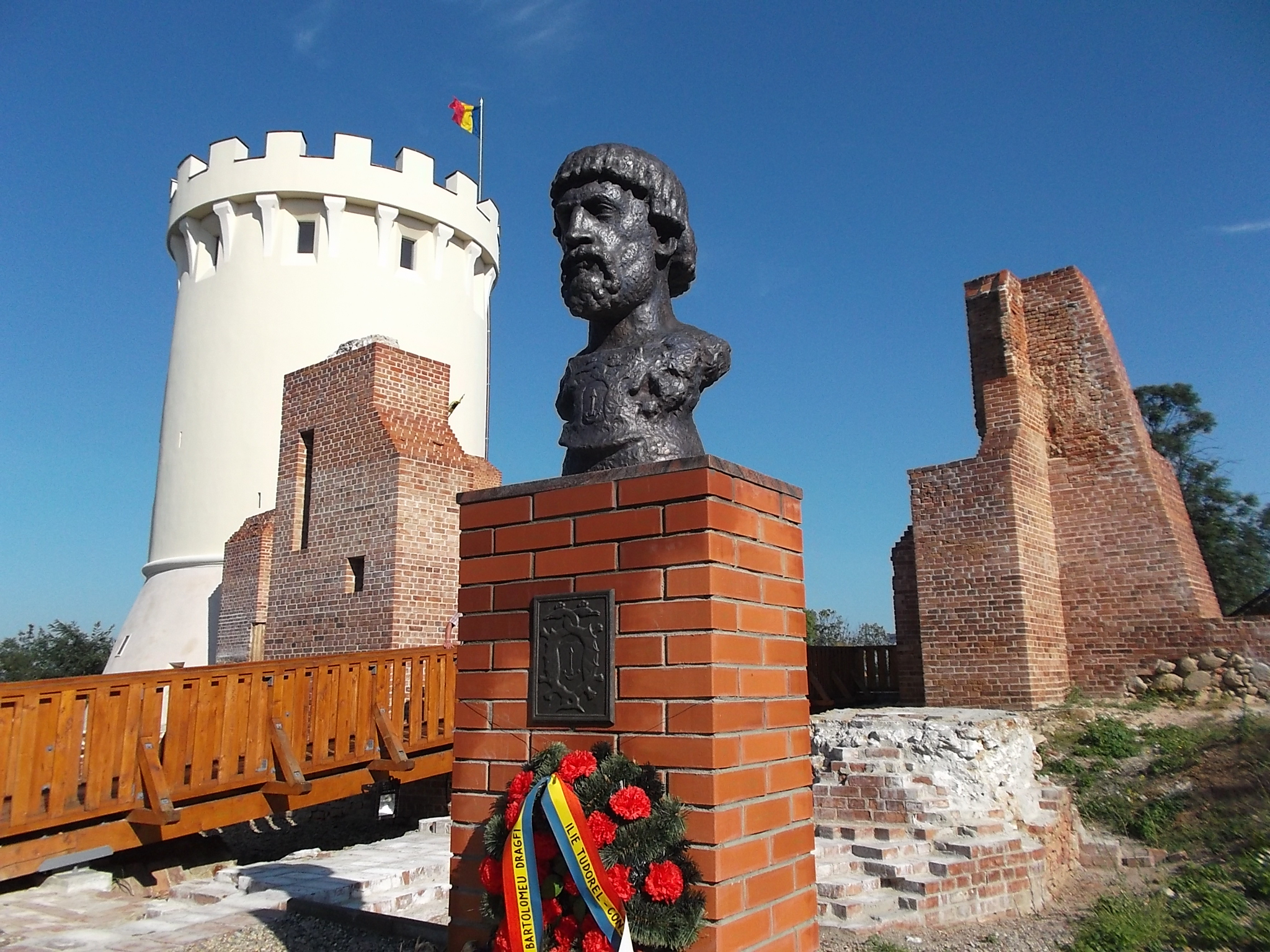
- Ardud fortress

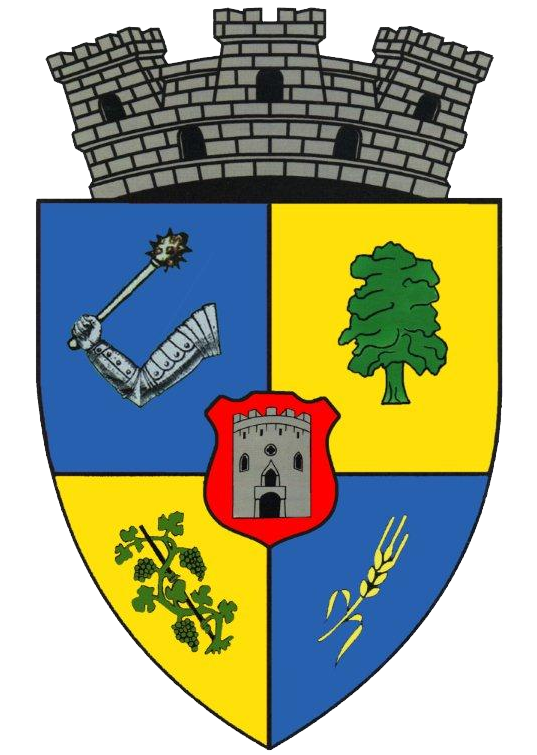
- Coat of arms

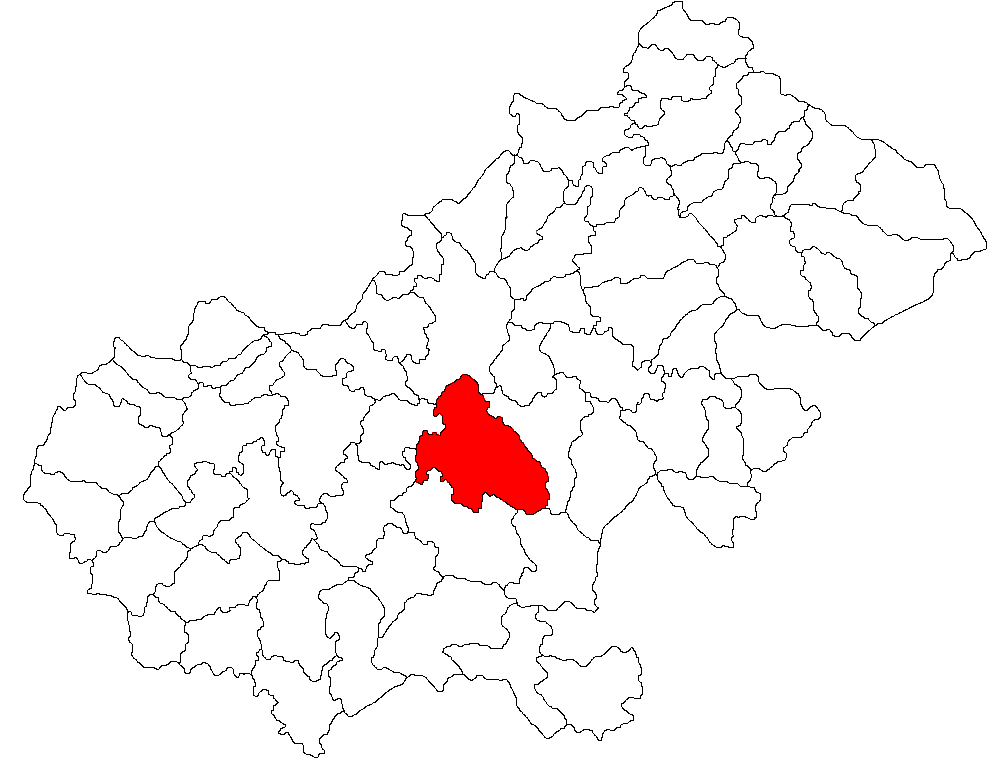
- Location in Satu Mare County

- Location in Romania
- Coordinates: 47°38′N 22°53′E
- Country: Romania
- County: Satu Mare

Government
  - Mayor (2024–2028): Ovidiu-Marius Duma (PNL)
- Area: 142.63 km^{2} (55.07 sq mi)
- Elevation: 148 m (486 ft)
- Population (2021-12-01): 6,124
  - Density: 42.94/km^{2} (111.2/sq mi)
- Time zone: UTC+02:00 (EET)
  - Summer (DST): UTC+03:00 (EEST)
- Postal code: 447020
- Area code: (+40) 02 61
- Vehicle reg.: SM
- Website: orasardud.ro

Ardud (Hungarian: Erdőd, Hungarian pronunciation: [ˈɛrdøːd]; German: Erdeed) is a town situated in Satu Mare County, Transylvania, Romania. It administers five villages: Ardud-Vii (Erdődhegy), Baba Novac (Lajosmajor), Gerăușa (Oláhgyűrűs), Mădăras (Nagymadarász), and Sărătura (Sóspuszta).

== History ==
The town has a complex history, having in different periods been part the Kingdom of Hungary, Ottoman Empire, Habsburg monarchy, and the Kingdom of Romania.

After the collapse of Austria-Hungary at the end of World War I, and the declaration of the Union of Transylvania with Romania, the Romanian Army took control of Ardud in April 1919, during the Hungarian–Romanian War. The city officially became part of the territory ceded to the Kingdom of Romania in June 1920 under the terms of the Treaty of Trianon. In August 1940, under the auspices of Nazi Germany, which imposed the Second Vienna Award, Hungary retook the territory of Northern Transylvania (which included Ardud) from Romania. Towards the end of World War II, however, the city was taken back from Hungarian and German troops by Romanian and Soviet forces in October 1944.

== Demographics ==
Historical population
Year	Pop.	±%
1869	4,357	—
1880	4,071	−6.6%
1890	4,926	+21.0%
1900	5,742	+16.6%
1910	6,302	+9.8%
1920	6,472	+2.7%
1930	7,313	+13.0%
1941	8,047	+10.0%
1956	8,331	+3.5%
1966	8,301	−0.4%
1977	8,393	+1.1%
1992	6,572	−21.7%
2002	6,486	−1.3%
2011	5,889	−9.2%
2021	6,124	+4.0%
Source: Census data

The 2011 census recorded a total population of 5,889; of these, 59.2% were Romanians, 18.6% Hungarians, 16.1% Roma, and 4.8% Germans. In 2002, 41.7% were Romanian Orthodox, 32.7% Roman Catholic, 13.9% Greek-Catholic, 5.1% Pentecostal, 4.2% Reformed and 2.3% Baptist. At the 2021 census, Ardud had a population of 6,124; of those, 61.17% were Romanians, 14.12% Hungarians, 8.23% Roma, and 2.38% Germans.

== Notable residents ==
- Tamás Bakócz (b. in Ardud 1442 – d. 1521), cardinal and leading statesman of the Kingdom of Hungary

== In popular culture ==
The 2022 drama film Sparta was filmed in Germany, Austria, and Romania. Filming in Romania took place in the winter of 2018–2019 and the summer of 2019, the primary location being the village of Baba Novac in Ardud.

== Twin towns ==
Ardud is twinned with:

- (France) Trevoux (1990)
- (France) La Martyre (1992)
- (Hungary) Szakoly (2004)
- (Hungary) Napkor (2005)
- (Ukraine) Velyki Berehy (2005)
