= Administrative divisions of Zakarpattia Oblast =

Zakarpattia Oblast is subdivided into districts (raions) which are subdivided into municipalities (hromadas).

== Current ==
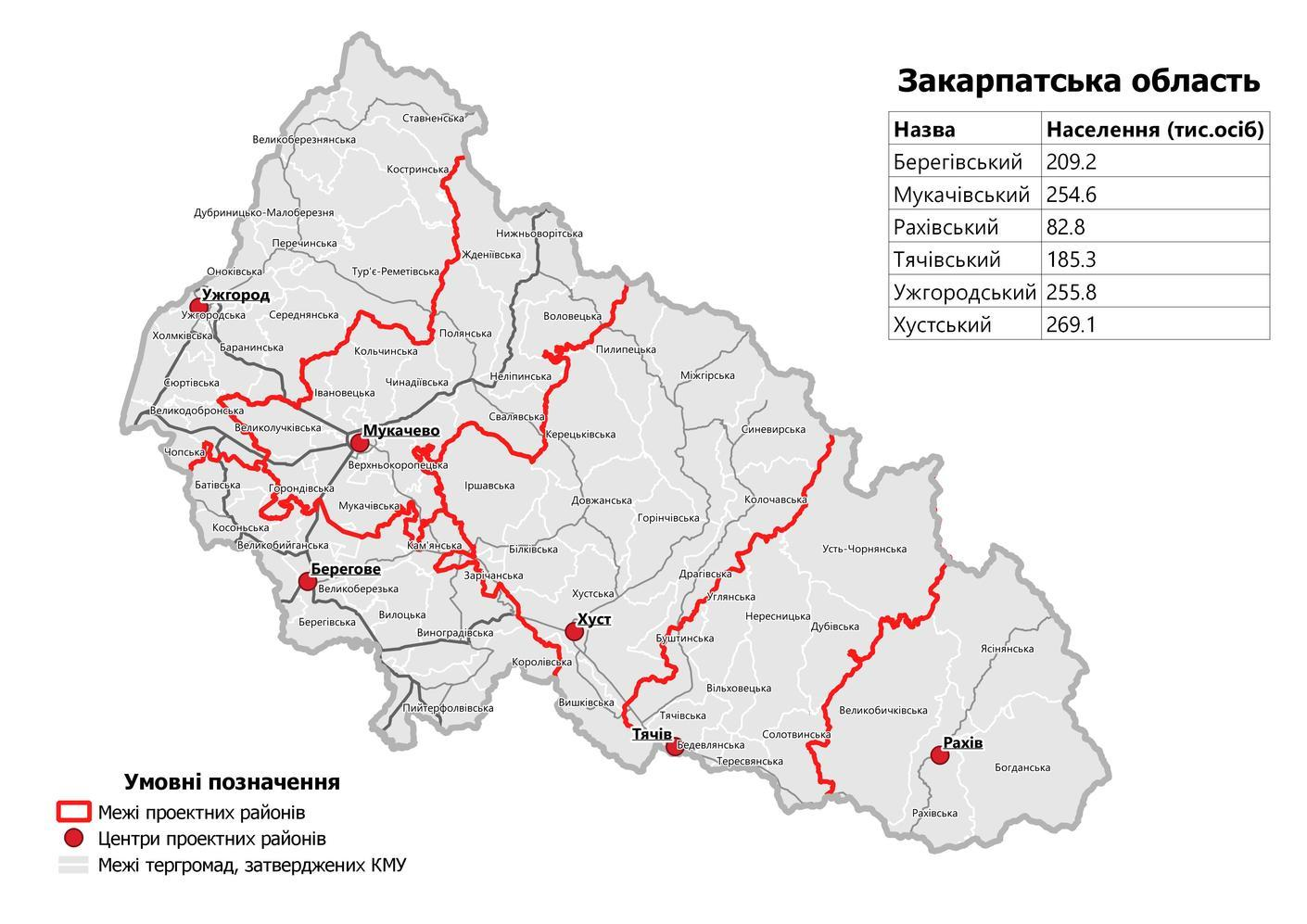
Raions of Zakarpattia Oblast as of August 2020.

On 18 July 2020, the number of districts was reduced to six. These are:

1. Berehove (Берегівський район), the center is in the town of Berehove;
2. Khust (Хустський район), the center is in the town of Khust;
3. Mukachevo (Мукачівський район), the center is in the town of Mukachevo;
4. Rakhiv (Рахівський район), the center is in the town of Rakhiv;
5. Tiachiv (Тячівський район), the center is in the town of Tiachiv;
6. Uzhhorod (Ужгородський район), the center is in the city of Uzhhorod.

**Zakarpattia Oblast**
As of January 1, 2022
Number of districts (raions)	6
Number of municipalities (hromadas)	64

=== Communities (hromadas) per District (raion) ===
In bold are communities (hromadas) with cities

Berehove Raion

- Batyovo
- **Berehove**
- Kamyanske
- Korolevo
- Koson
- Piyterfolvo
- Velyka Biyhan
- Velyki Berehy
- Vylok
- **Vynohradiv**

Khust Raion

- Bilky
- Dovhe
- Drahovo
- Horinchovo
- **Irshava**
- Keretski
- **Khust**
- Kolochava
- Mizhhirya
- Pylypets
- Synevyr
- Vyshkovo
- Zarichia

Mukachevo Raion

- Chynadiyovo
- Horonda
- Ivanivtsi
- Kolchyno
- **Mukachevo**
- Nelipyno
- Nyzhni Vorota
- Poliana
- **Svaliava**
- Velyki Luchky
- Verkhniy Koropets
- Volovets
- Zhdeniievo

Rakhiv Raion

- Bohdan
- Velykyi Bychkiv
- **Rakhiv**
- Yasinia

Tiachiv Raion

- Bedevlia
- Bushtyno
- Dubove
- Neresnytsia
- Solotvyno
- Teresva
- **Tiachiv**
- Uhlia
- Ust-Chorna
- Vilkhivtsi

Uzhhorod Raion

- Baranyntsi
- **Chop**
- Dubrynychi
- Kholmok
- Kostryna
- Onokivtsi
- **Perechyn**
- Serednie
- Siurte
- Stavne
- Turyi-Remety
- **Uzhhorod**
- Velyka Dobron
- Velykyi Bereznyi

== Administrative divisions until 2020 ==
Raions of Zakarpattia Oblast as of June 2020. The city of Uzhhorod is shown in dark blue.

Until June 2020, Zakarpattia Oblast was subdivided into 18 regions: 13 districts (raions) and 5 city municipalities (mis'krada or misto), officially known as territories governed by city councils.

- Cities under the oblast's jurisdiction:
  - Uzhhorod (Ужгород), the administrative center of the oblast
  - Berehove Municipality
    - Cities and towns under the city's jurisdiction:
      - Berehove (Берегове)
  - Chop (Чоп)
  - Khust Municipality
    - Cities and towns under the city's jurisdiction:
      - Khust (Хуст)
  - Mukachevo (Мукачеве)
- Districts (raions):
  - Berehove (Берегівський район)
    - Urban-type settlements under the district's jurisdiction:
      - Batiovo (Батьово)
  - Irshava (Іршавський район)
    - Cities and towns under the district's jurisdiction:
      - Irshava (Іршава)
  - Khust (Хустський район)
    - Urban-type settlements under the district's jurisdiction:
      - Vyshkovo (Вишково)
  - Mizhhiria (Міжгірський район)
    - Urban-type settlements under the district's jurisdiction:
      - Mizhhiria (Міжгір'я)
  - Mukachevo (Мукачівський район)
    - Urban-type settlements under the district's jurisdiction:
      - Chynadiiovo (Чинадійово)
      - Kolchyno (Кольчино)
  - Perechyn (Перечинський район)
    - Cities and towns under the district's jurisdiction:
      - Perechyn (Перечин)
  - Rakhiv (Рахівський район)
    - Cities and towns under the district's jurisdiction:
      - Rakhiv (Рахів)
    - Urban-type settlements under the district's jurisdiction:
      - Kobyletska Poliana (Кобилецька Поляна)
      - Velykyi Bychkiv (Великий Бичків)
      - Yasinia (Ясіня)
  - Svaliava (Свалявський район)
    - Cities and towns under the district's jurisdiction:
      - Svaliava (Свалява)
  - Tiachiv (Тячівський район)
    - Cities and towns under the district's jurisdiction:
      - Tiachiv (Тячів)
    - Urban-type settlements under the district's jurisdiction:
      - Bushtyno (Буштино)
      - Dubove (Дубове)
      - Solotvyno (Солотвино)
      - Teresva (Тересва)
      - Ust-Chorna (Усть-Чорна)
  - Uzhhorod (Ужгородський район)
    - Urban-type settlements under the district's jurisdiction:
      - Serednie (Середнє)
  - Velykyi Bereznyi (Великоберезнянський район)
    - Urban-type settlements under the district's jurisdiction:
      - Velykyi Bereznyi (Великий Березний)
  - Vynohradiv (Виноградівський район)
    - Cities and towns under the district's jurisdiction:
      - Vynohradiv (Виноградів)
    - Urban-type settlements under the district's jurisdiction:
      - Korolevo (Королево)
      - Vylok (Вилок)
  - Volovets (Воловецький район)
    - Urban-type settlements under the district's jurisdiction:
      - Volovets (Воловець)
      - Zhdeniievo (Жденієво)
