= Huklyvyi =

Village in western Ukraine

Huklyvyi Гукливий Zúgó
- Village
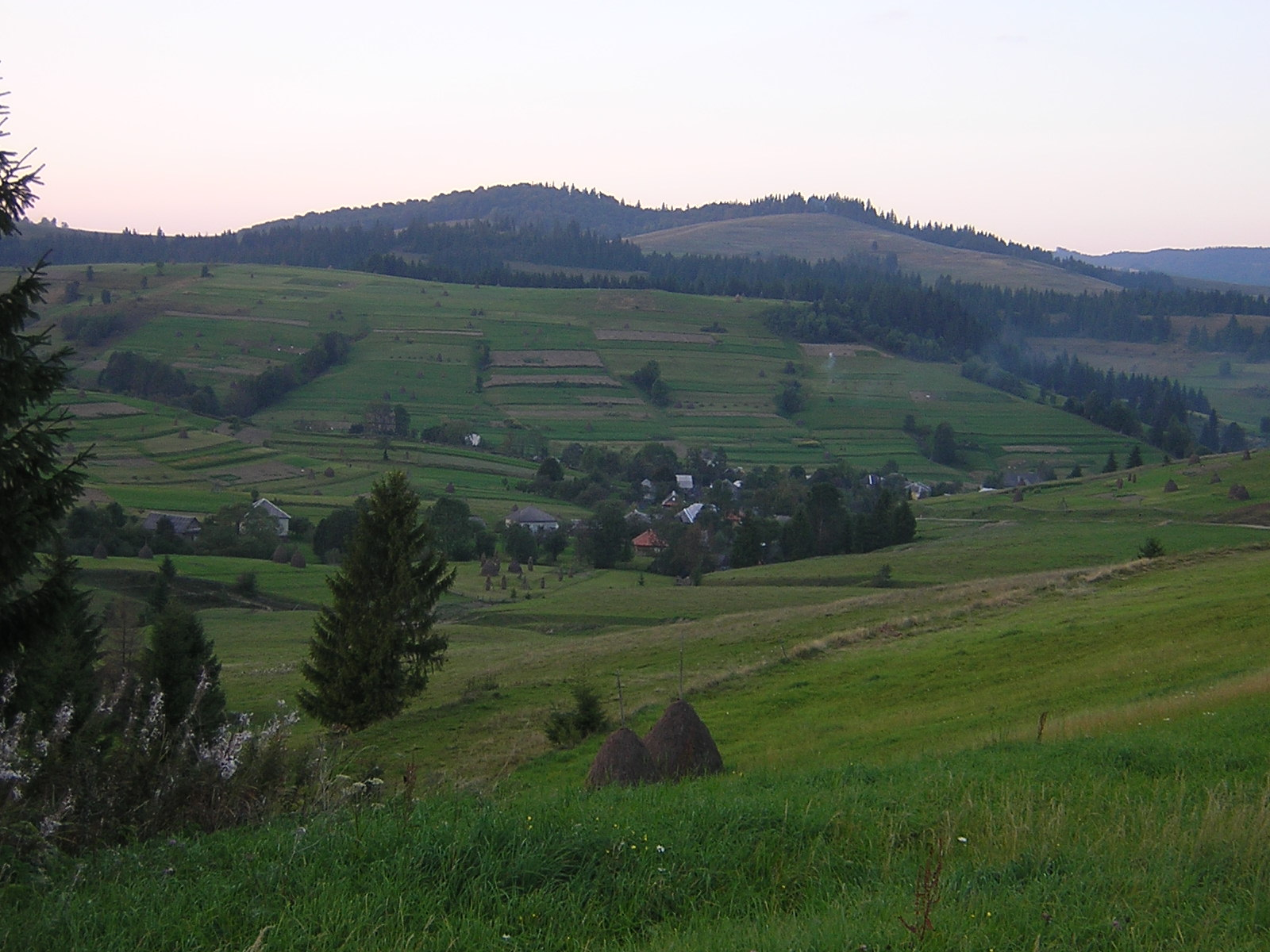
- View of the village of Huklyvyi

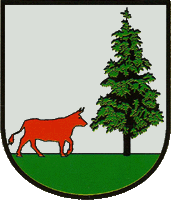
- Coat of arms
- Interactive map of Huklyvyi
- Location within Zakarpattia Oblast Location within Ukraine
- Coordinates: 48°42′27″N 23°14′46″E
- Country: Ukraine
- Oblast: Zakarpattia Oblast
- Raion: Mukachevo Raion
- Hromada: Volovets settlement hromada
- Founded: 1588

Area
  - Total: 3.791 km^{2} (1.464 sq mi)
- Elevation: 558 m (1,831 ft)

Population (2001)
  - Total: 2,109
  - Density: 556.3/km^{2} (1,441/sq mi)
- Time zone: UTC+2 (EET)
  - Summer (DST): UTC+3 (EEST)
- Postal code: 89140
- Area code: +380 3136
- KOATUU: 2121583001
- KATOTTH: UA21040050020063265

Huklyvyi (Hungarian: Zúgó) is a village in the Zakarpattia Oblast (province) in western Ukraine. It was in the Volovets Raion (district) before the restructuring in 2020 and is now in the Mukachevo Raion. Huklyvyi has a wooden church.

== Name ==
According to the JewishGen locality page, Huklyvyi is alternately known as "Huklyvyy [Ukr], Huklivý [Slov], Okliva [Yid], Hukliva [Hun, until 1899], Zúgó [Hun, since 1899], Guklivyy [Rus], Gukliva, Huklivá, Huklivé, Huklivoje, Huklivij."

Era	Name	District	Province	Country
Before 1899	Hukliva			Hungary
Before World War I (c. 1900)	Zúgó	Bereg	Kárpátalja	Hungary
Between the wars (c. 1930)	Huklivy		Subcarpathia	Czechoslovakia
After World War II (c. 1950)	Guklivyy			Soviet Union
After the USSR ended (1991-2020)	Huklyvyi	Volovets	Zakarpattia	Ukraine
After restructuring in 2020	Huklyvyi	Mukachevo	Zakarpattia	Ukraine

== History ==
Jewish families that could not prove their citizenship were deported in 1941. The remaining Jewish population was deported to Auschwitz in May 1944.

== Church ==
The Church of the Holy Spirit (Ukrainian: Церква Святого Духа, Russian: Церковь Святого Духа ) is a wooden Eastern Orthodox Church in Huklyvyi.

=== Gallery ===
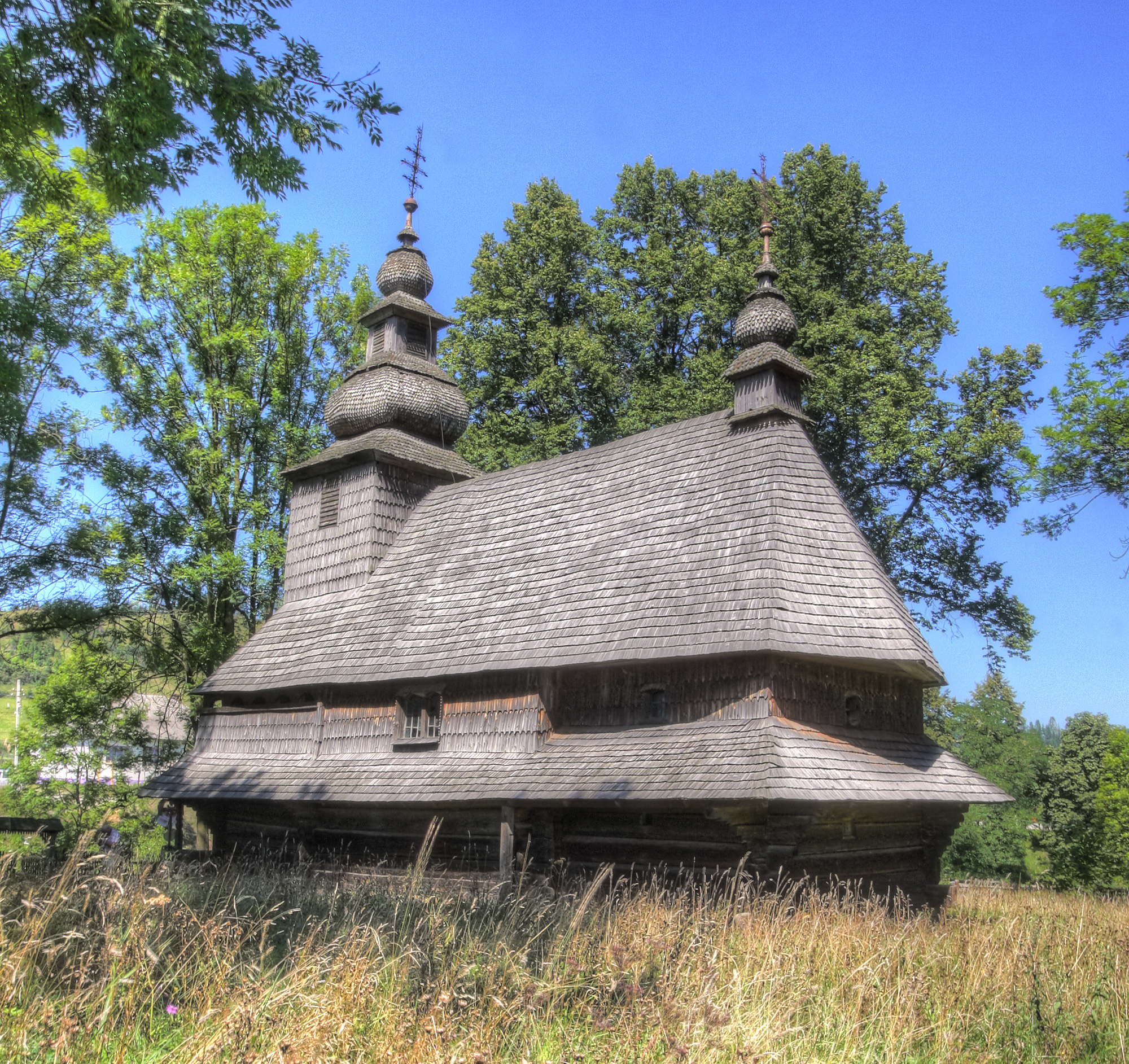
Wooden Church of the Holy Spirit

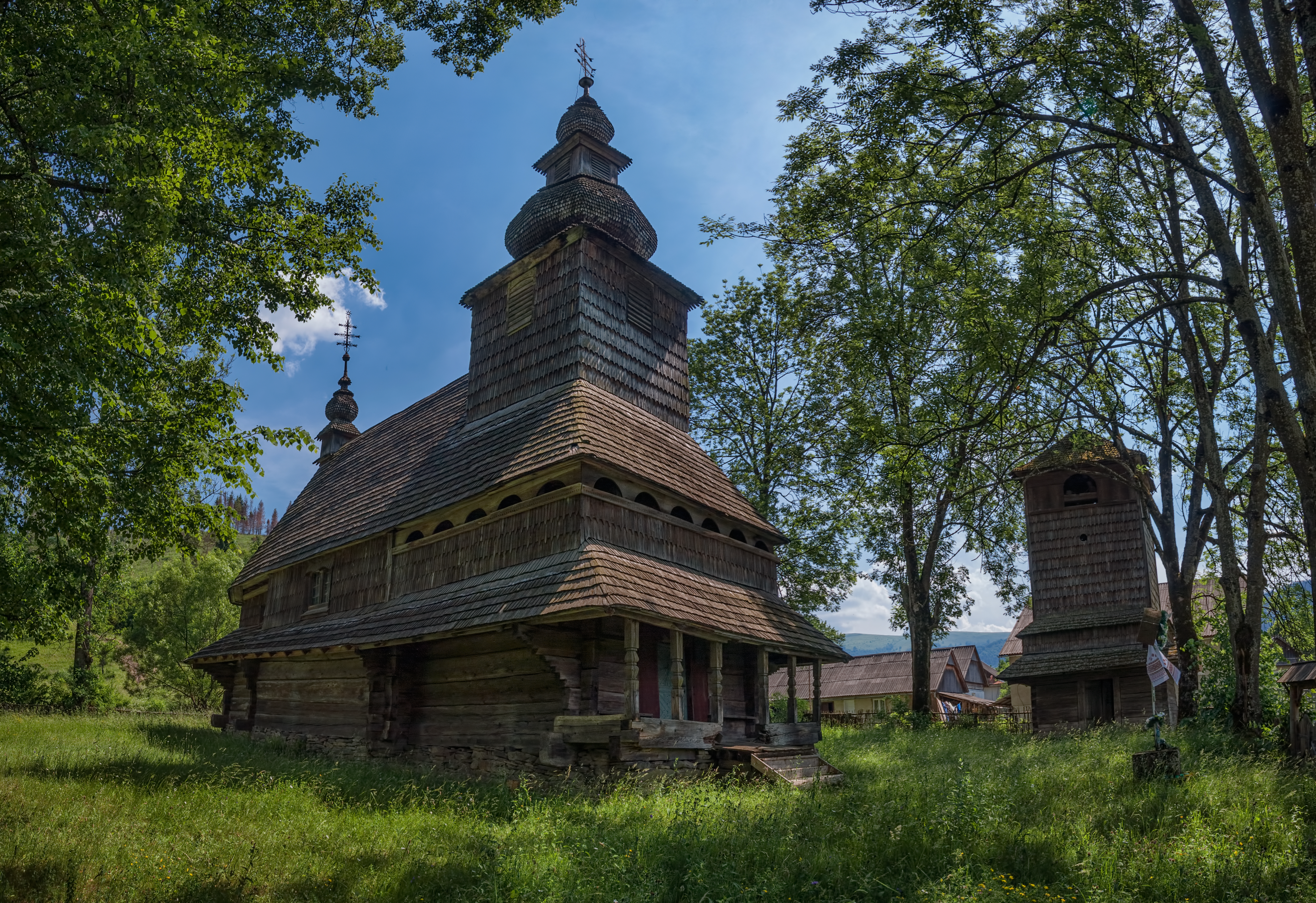
Wooden Church of the Holy Spirit and its Bell Tower

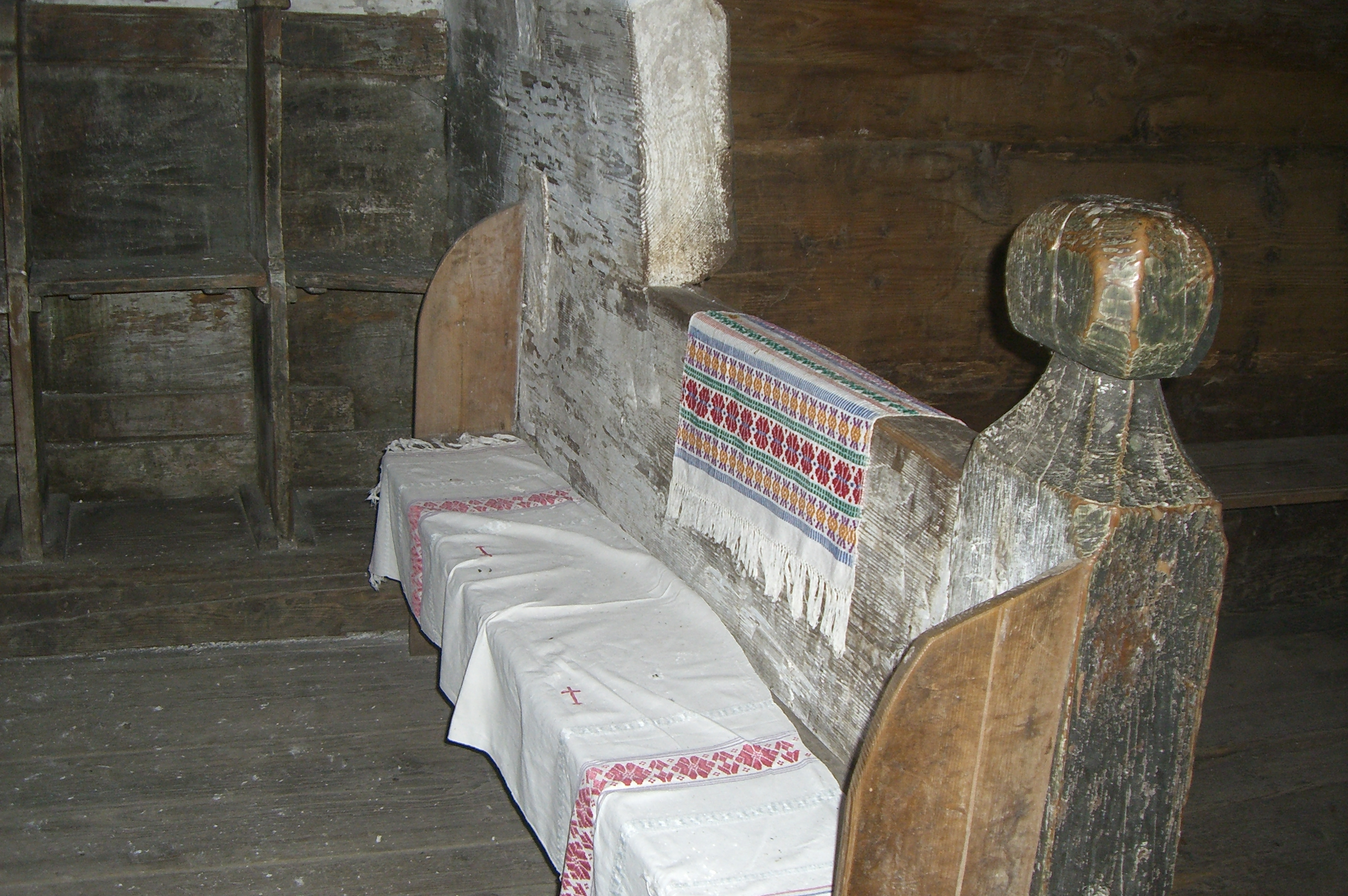
Wooden pew

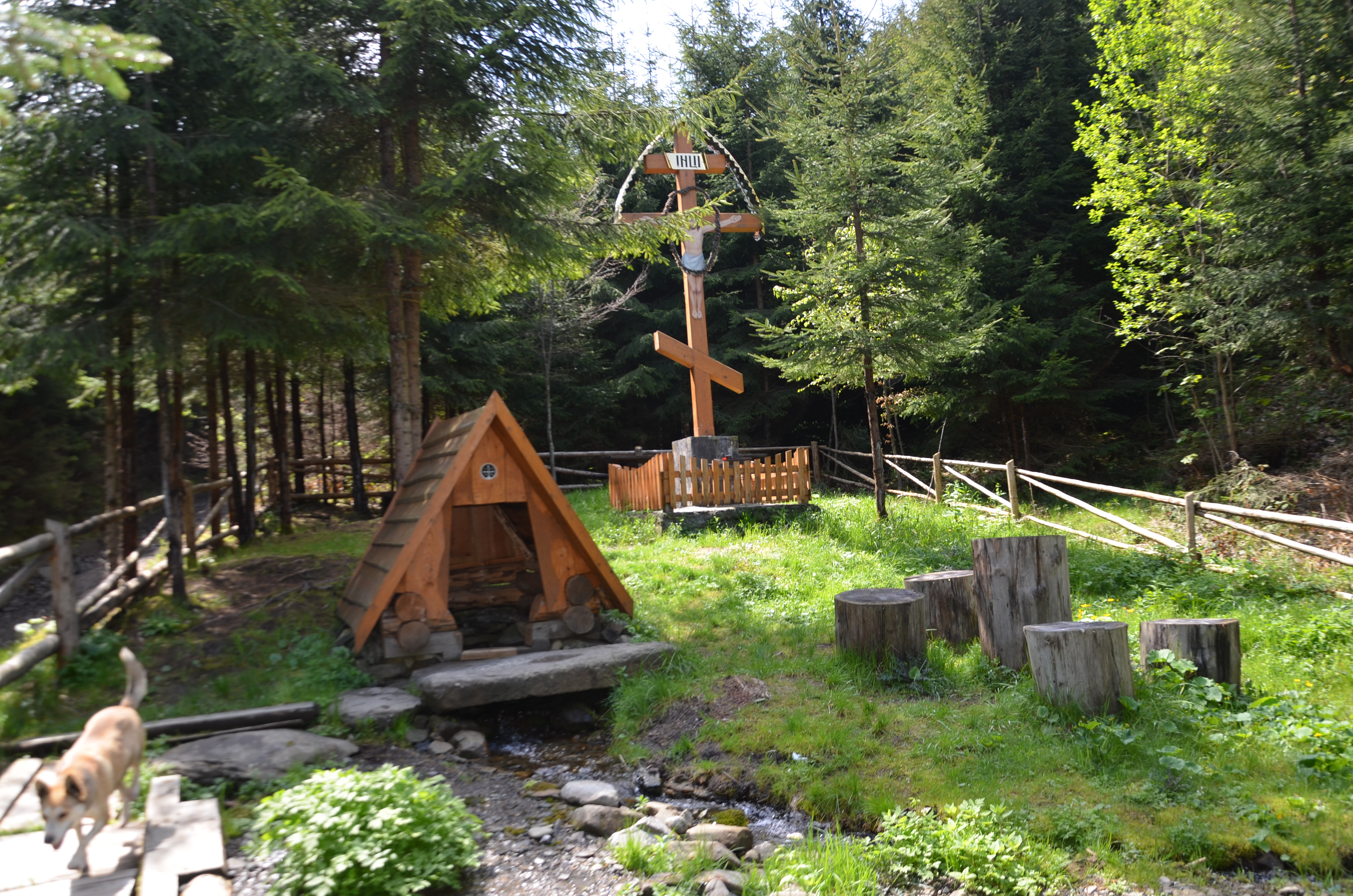
Holy Spring
