= Bila Tserkva, Zakarpattia Oblast =

Bila Tserkva Біла Церква Biserica Albă
- Village
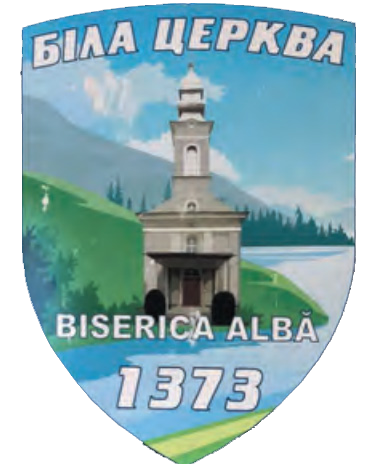
- Coat of arms
- Interactive map of Bila Tserkva
- Location in Zakarpattia Oblast Location in Ukraine
- Coordinates: 47°57′0″N 23°55′59.99″E
- Country: Ukraine
- Oblast: Zakarpattia Oblast
- Raion: Tiachiv Raion
- Hromada: Solotvyno rural hromada

Area
  - Total: 11.10 km^{2} (4.29 sq mi)
- Elevation: 281 m (922 ft)

Population (2021)
  - Total: 3,024
  - Density: 272.4/km^{2} (705.6/sq mi)
- Time zone: UTC+2 (EET)
  - Summer (DST): UTC+3 (EEST)
- Postal code: 90614
- Area code: +380 3132
- KOATUU: 2123681001

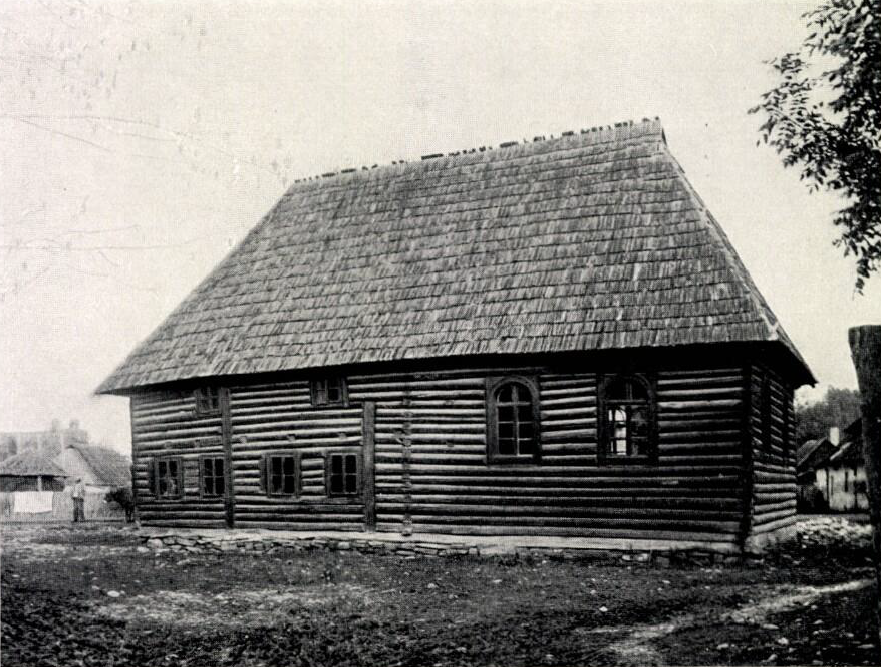
A synagogue in Bila Tserkva in 1929.

Bila Tserkva (Ukrainian: Біла Церква, Romanian: Biserica Albă, Hungarian: Fejéregyháza or Fehéregyháza or Tiszafejéregyháza, Slovak: Bilá Cirkev) is a village in Tiachiv Raion, Zakarpattia Oblast, Ukraine. It belongs to Solotvyno rural hromada, one of the hromadas of Ukraine.

== History ==
In September 2012, Romanian became the regional language in the village of Bila Tserkva; meaning it was allowed to be used in administrative office work and documents. This was made possible after new legislation on languages in Ukraine was passed in the summer of 2012. However, the Constitutional Court of Ukraine on 28 February 2018 ruled this legislation unconstitutional.

On 21 August 2025, in Bila Tserkva, the Museum of the Romanians of the Right Bank of the Tisza (Muzeului Românilor din Dreapta Tisei) was inaugurated at an event attended by the representative of the Romanian consulate in Solotvyno (Slatina), consul Florin Grațian Pârvu, and numerous representatives of the Romanian community in Zakarpattia Oblast.

In December 2025 construction of a new bridge connecting the Bila Tserkva and Sighetu Marmației was finished. On 17 September 2026 a new border crossing connecting Ukraine and Romania was officially opened between the two settlements. The bridge was inaugurated on 8 October, providing the Romanians in Transcarpathia a direct connexion with Romania and with relatives across the border.

== Demographics ==
In 2001, 97.16% of the inhabitants spoke Romanian as their native language, while 1.26% spoke Ukrainian.

== Notable people ==
- Victoria Darvai (1926–2016), Romanian folk musician
