= Pavlovo, Zakarpattia Oblast =

Pavlovo
- Village
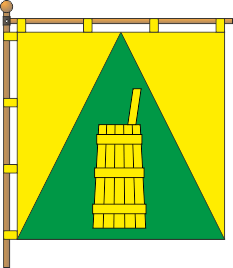
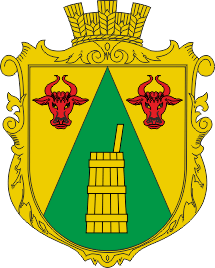
- Flag Coat of arms
- Interactive map of Pavlovo
- Location within Ukraine Location within Zakarpattia Oblast
- Coordinates: 48°38′52″N 22°54′54″E
- Country: Ukraine
- Oblast: Zakarpattia Oblast
- Raion: Svaliava Raion

Pavlovo (Ukrainian: Павлово; Hungarian: Kispálos) is a village in Svaliava Raion (district) of Zakarpattia Oblast (province) in western Ukraine. It had a population of 770, according to the 2001 census.

The village is located 17 miles from Mukachevo and 8 miles from Svaliava.

According to the Ukrainian Census, about 99% of the population speak the Ukrainian language as a native language, while 0.13% speak Russian and 0.13% speak Belorussian. Pavlovo had a Jewish community with a population of 71 in 1880. The Jewish community was eliminated during the Holocaust, primarily through forced labor battalions and deportation to Auschwitz concentration camp.
