= Martin Greenfield =

American master tailor (1928–2024)

- Born: Maxmilian Grünfeld; August 9, 1928; Pavlovo, First Czechoslovak Republic
- Died: March 20, 2024 (aged 95); Manhasset, New York, U.S.
- Occupation: Tailor
- Years active: 1947–2024
- Spouse: Arlene Bergen (m. 1956)
- Children: 2

Martin Greenfield (born Maxmilian Grünfeld; August 9, 1928 – March 20, 2024) was an American master tailor, based in Brooklyn, New York, specializing in men's suits. Described in 2014 as "the best men's tailor" in the United States, his list of clients included six U.S. presidents, as well as other notable politicians and celebrities. His company, Martin Greenfield Clothiers, also has a white-label business, fashioning men's suits for clothing lines DKNY and Rag & Bone and the television show Boardwalk Empire.

Greenfield was a Holocaust survivor, having been imprisoned as a teenager at Auschwitz where the rest of his immediate family were murdered.

== Early life ==
Greenfield was born on August 9, 1928, to a Jewish family in Pavlovo, a small village located in Carpathian Ruthenia, on the southeastern tip of Czechoslovakia in what is now Ukraine. At age 14, Greenfield was rounded up along with his father, mother, two sisters, brother, and grandparents. All were transported to Auschwitz concentration camp, where his two sisters, infant brother, and grandparents were immediately sent to the gas chamber, followed shortly after by his mother, who was unable to let go of her baby. Greenfield's father died shortly before Auschwitz was liberated by Soviet soldiers in January 1945, leaving him the only member of his family to survive the war.

During his time in Auschwitz, Greenfield learned the power behind clothing. After being beaten for accidentally ripping a Nazi's shirt, he stole it, repaired it, and wore it underneath his uniform all throughout his time in the camp. Wearing the shirt made him realize that clothes possess power; this became an inspiration to Martin and helped him survive the Holocaust. This experience was a contributing factor to how he became one of the most successful and famous men's tailors of America.

Near the end of World War II, Greenfield was moved along with other Auschwitz prisoners to the Buchenwald concentration camp. In April 1945, the American army stormed the camp, and liberated its prisoners. As the troops passed through the camp, Greenfield stopped a young rabbi who was serving as a U.S. Army chaplain and asked him, "where was God?" The rabbi, Herschel Schacter, later told Greenfield that he had never forgotten the question. When General Dwight D. Eisenhower arrived to supervise the liberation Greenfield shook his hand; coincidentally, standing next to Greenfield at the time was Elie Wiesel, who would later become famous writing about his time in the concentration camps.

Soon after the liberation, Greenfield and another teenage survivor set out to kill the wife of the mayor, who had previously had Greenfield beaten for trying to eat food intended for her pet rabbits. When they found her, she was carrying her newborn baby, and Greenfield relented; he has described that moment as when he "became human again".

Greenfield spent the next two years in Europe, looking for his remaining immediate family, unaware that they had all been killed. His father was killed one week before his camp was liberated. In 1947, at age 19, he boarded a ship to the United States, and stayed with wealthy relatives in Baltimore. Soon afterward, he moved to New York City, where an aunt of his lived.

== Career ==
In 1947, a Czech immigrant guided him to GGG Clothing, a clothing manufacturer in the East Williamsburg neighborhood of Brooklyn, where he was hired as a "floor boy". Over the next decade, his tailoring skills and reputation grew. His first major client, in the early 1950s, was General Eisenhower, then preparing to run for the presidency.

In 1977, Greenfield bought GGG Clothing, and renamed it to Martin Greenfield Clothiers. The company would grow from six employees at the time to 117 by 2010.

Greenfield's clientele included U.S. presidents Eisenhower, Bill Clinton, Lyndon B. Johnson, Gerald Ford, Barack Obama (including his tan suit), and Donald Trump; General Colin Powell, celebrities Paul Newman, Leonardo DiCaprio, Conan O'Brien, Jimmy Fallon, Johnny Depp, and Ben Affleck, conductor Gilbert Levine, Cardinal Edward Egan, athletes Patrick Ewing, Shaquille O'Neal, LeBron James, Carmelo Anthony, and Wayne Gretzky and New York City political figures Michael Bloomberg and Ray Kelly.

Greenfield and his company have served as the tailor for men's suits for fashion lines including DKNY, Brooks Brothers, Neiman Marcus, and Rag & Bone. His company also created the suits for the 1920s-set HBO television show Boardwalk Empire.

== Personal life ==
Greenfield married Arlene Bergen in 1956. They had two sons, Jay and Tod. Both sons work at Martin Greenfield Clothiers, and Jay, his elder son, serves as executive vice president. His personal memoir, entitled Measure of a Man: From Auschwitz Survivor to Presidents' Tailor, was published in 2014.

Greenfield died at a hospital in Manhasset, New York, on March 20, 2024, at age 95.
