= Ivan Ljavinec =

Czech hierarch

- Titular Bishop of Acalissus
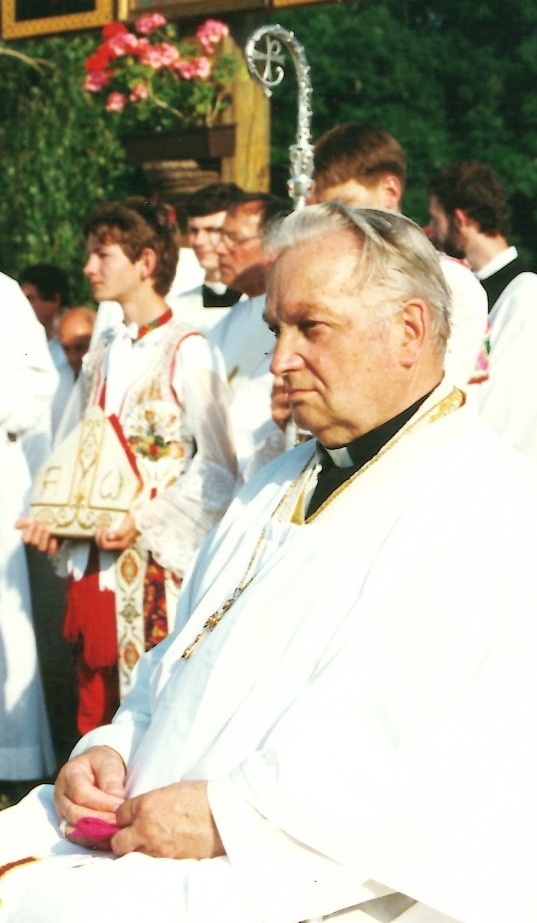
- Church: Ruthenian Greek Catholic Church
- Diocese: Apostolic Exarchate in the Czech Republic
- See: Titular See of Acalissus
- In office: 1996 - 2012
- Predecessor: Benigno Chiriboga
- Successor: vacant

Orders
- Ordination: 28 July 1946 by Theodore Romzha
- Consecration: 30 March 1996 by Miroslav Stefan Marusyn

Personal details
- Born: 18 April 1923 Volovec, Czechoslovakia (present day Ukraine)
- Died: 9 December 2012 (aged 89) Žernůvka, Czech Republic
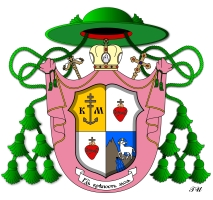
- Coat of arms: Ivan Ljavinec's coat of arms

Ivan Ljavinec (18 April 1923 – 9 December 2012) was a Czech hierarch of the Ruthenian Greek Catholic Church.

Ljavinec was born in Volovec, Czechoslovakia (now in Ukraine) and ordained a priest on 28 July 1946. Ljavinec was appointed titular bishop of Acalissus as well as Apostolic Exarch of the Apostolic Exarchate of the Greek Catholic Church in the Czech Republic on 18 January 1996 and consecrated a bishop on 30 March 1996. Ljavinec retired as apostolic exarch on 23 April 2003.

He lived as the Apostolic Exarch emeritus in the House of St. Elżbeta in Žernůvka, Czech Republic, where died. His body was transferred in Ukraine and, on 15 December 2012, buried in his native Volovec.
