= Volovets =

Rural locality in Zakarpattia Oblast, Ukraine

Volovets Воловець
- Rural settlement
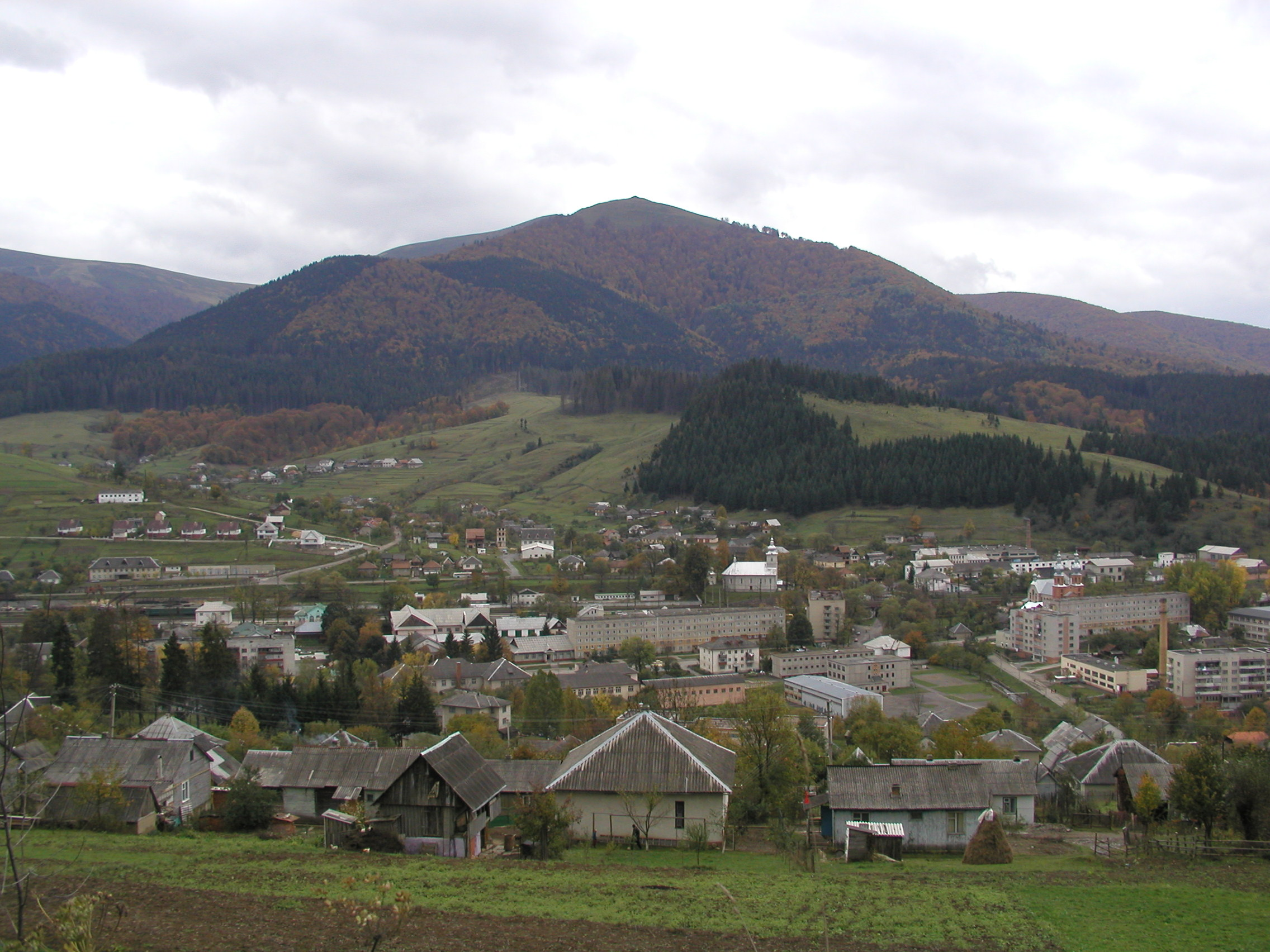
- View of Volovets

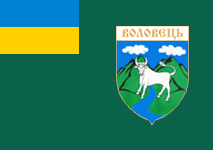
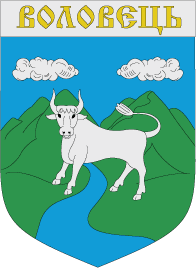
- Flag Coat of arms
- Interactive map of Volovets
- Location of Volovets in Zakarpattia Oblast Location of Volovets in Ukraine
- Coordinates: 48°42′40″N 23°11′18″E
- Country: Ukraine
- Oblast: Zakarpattia Oblast
- Raion: Mukachevo Raion
- Established: 1433
- Urban-type settlement status: 1957

Government
  - Settlement Head: Mykhailo Popelych
- Elevation: 479 m (1,572 ft)

Population (2022)
  - Total: ▼4,961
- Time zone: UTC+2 (EET)
  - Summer (DST): UTC+3 (EEST)
- Postal code: 89100
- Area code: +380 3136
- Website: http://rada.gov.ua/

Volovets (Ukrainian: Воловець; Hungarian: Volóc; Polish: Wołowiec; Russian: Воловец; Slovak: Volovec) is a rural settlement in Mukachevo Raion, Zakarpattia Oblast, western Ukraine. Volovets was the administrative center of Volovets Raion (district) until 2020, housing the district's local administration buildings. The town's population was 5,178 as of the 2001 Ukrainian Census. Current population: 4,961 (2022 estimate).

== History ==
Until 26 January 2024, Volovets was designated urban-type settlement. On this day, a new law entered into force which abolished this status, and Volovets became a rural settlement.

== Names ==
There are several alternative names used for this settlement: Hungarian: Volóc, German: Wolowez, Slovak: Volovec, Russian: Воловец.

== Sites ==
From the 1850s, when Volovets was part of Austria-Hungary, the town had a ski ramp. The ramp was used by Emperor Franz Joseph I when he and his family came to visit in 1862.

== Sister cities ==
- Bad Endorf, Germany (2001)

== Tourism ==
Volovets is the main transport location through which passenger trains and tourists to Transcarpathia from almost all over Ukraine go. Volovets district is part of the ethnographic district of Boykivshchyna, which is one of the four well-known historical and ethnographic groups of the Ukrainian Carpathians - Hutsuls, Boykos, Lemkos and Dolynians. Volovets district offers guests both calm and active recreation. Special mention should be made of the recreational area of the village of Zhdeniievo, with its numerous camp sites and hotels that provide services for different groups of tourists.

Here you can go paragliding (Borzhava mountain meadow), ride ATVs, mountain bikes, and in winter enjoy skiing and snowboarding.

== People from Volovets ==
- Vasyl Betsa (born 1996), Ukrainian footballer
- Ivan Ljavinec, a Ruthenian hierarch
