= Tiachiv Raion =

Subdivision of Zakarpattia Oblast, Ukraine

Tiachiv Raion Тячівський район
- Raion
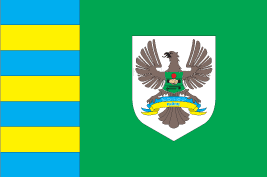
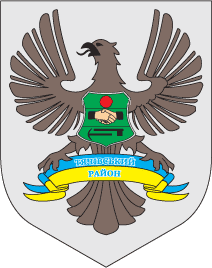
- Flag Coat of arms

- Coordinates: 48°1′10.8″N 23°34′4.52″E
- Country: Ukraine
- Oblast: Zakarpattia Oblast
- Established: 1946
- Admin. center: Tiachiv
- Subdivisions: 10 hromadas

Area
  - Total: 1,869.5 km^{2} (721.8 sq mi)

Population (2022)
  - Total: 183,756
  - Density: 98.292/km^{2} (254.57/sq mi)
- Time zone: UTC+02:00 (EET)
  - Summer (DST): UTC+03:00 (EEST)
- Area code: 380-3134
- Website: tyachiv-rda.gov.ua

Tiachiv Raion (Ukrainian: Тячівський район; Romanian: Raionul Teceu; Hungarian: Técsői járás) is a raion in Zakarpattia Oblast in western Ukraine. Its administrative center is Tiachiv. Population: 183,756 (2022 estimate).

On 18 July 2020, as part of the administrative reform of Ukraine, the number of raions of Zakarpattia Oblast was reduced to six, and the area of Tiachiv Raion was significantly expanded.

== Administrative division ==
Number of settlements: 64. Number of cities: 1. Tiachiv Raion includes 10 territorial communities.

The raion has one city, Tiachiv, and five urban-type settlements: Bushtyno, Dubove, Solotvyno, Teresva and Ust-Chorna.

== Geography ==
Tiachiv Raion is located in the highest part of the Ukrainian Carpathians: in the south, the Volcanic Range and the Polonyn Range; in the north, the southern slopes of the Gorgany. The relief of the highlands shows signs of ancient glaciation: cirque and trough valleys.

The area of the Tiachiv Raion is 1873.89 km^{2}

The climate in Tiachiv Raion is moderately continental. The average temperature in January is -4.8 °C and in July +18.0 °C, and the average annual temperature is 7.4 °C. The average annual precipitation is 1300 mm, the maximum of which falls on June-July. With increasing altitude above sea level, the air temperature decreases and the amount of precipitation increases.

The district is located on the right bank of the Tisza River (Danube basin).

Located in the Tiachiv Raion, the Romania Cave is the largest karst cave in the Zakarpattia Oblast.

Rakhiv Raion contains the following deposits: natural gas, granite, rock salt, marble, and mineral waters.

The Carpathian Biosphere Reserve is located in the Tiachiv Raion. The virgin forests and high-altitude meadows of this reserve belong to the most valuable ecosystems on the planet and are part of the UNESCO International Network of Biosphere Reserves. This territory is home to such large predators as the bear, wolf, and lynx.

== Demographics ==
According to the 2001 census, the majority of the population of the Teceu district spoke Ukrainian (83.52%), with Romanian (12.45%), Hungarian (2.76%) and Russian (1.06%) speakers in the minority. The January 2020 estimate of the raion population was 175,048 (2020 est.).

In September 2012, Romanian became a regional language in the village of Bila Tserkva, meaning it was allowed to be used in the towns administrative office work and documents. This was made possible after new legislation on languages in Ukraine was passed in the summer of 2012. The Constitutional Court of Ukraine on 28 February 2018 ruled this legislation unconstitutional.

== See also ==
- Administrative divisions of Zakarpattia Oblast

== Bibliography ==
- Національний атлас України/НАН України, Інститут географії, Державна служба геодезії, картографії та кадастру; голов. ред. Л. Г. Руденко; голова ред. кол.Б.Є. Патон. — К.: ДНВП «Картографія», 2007. — 435 с. — 5 тис.прим. — ISBN 978-966-475-067-4.
- Географічна енциклопедія України : [у 3 т.] / редкол.: О. М. Маринич (відповід. ред.) та ін. — К., 1989—1993. — 33 000 екз. — ISBN 5-88500-015-8.
- Воропай, Л.І., Куниця, М.О. (1966). Українські Карпати: Фізико-географічний нарис. Київ : Радянська школа, 167.
