= Vasyl Betsa =

Ukrainian footballer

Personal information
- Full name: Vasyl Mykhaylovych Betsa
- Date of birth: 28 September 1996 (age 30)
- Place of birth: Volovets, Ukraine
- Height: 1.75 m (5 ft 9 in)
- Position: Right-back

Youth career
- 2009–2013: SDYuSShOR Uzhhorod

Senior career*
Years	Team	Apps	(Gls)
2014	Serednye		
2014	Volovets		
2014–2016	Hoverla Uzhhorod	0	(0)
2016	Serednye	23	(2)
2016–2017	Slovenský Grob	0	(0)
2017–2020	Mynai	67	(2)
2020–2021	Uzhhorod	13	(1)
- * Club domestic league appearances and goals as of 15 February 2022

Vasyl Mykhaylovych Betsa (Ukrainian: Василь Михайлович Беца; born 28 September 1996) is a Ukrainian professional footballer who plays as a right-back.
