= Nelepeč-Žernůvka =

- Municipality
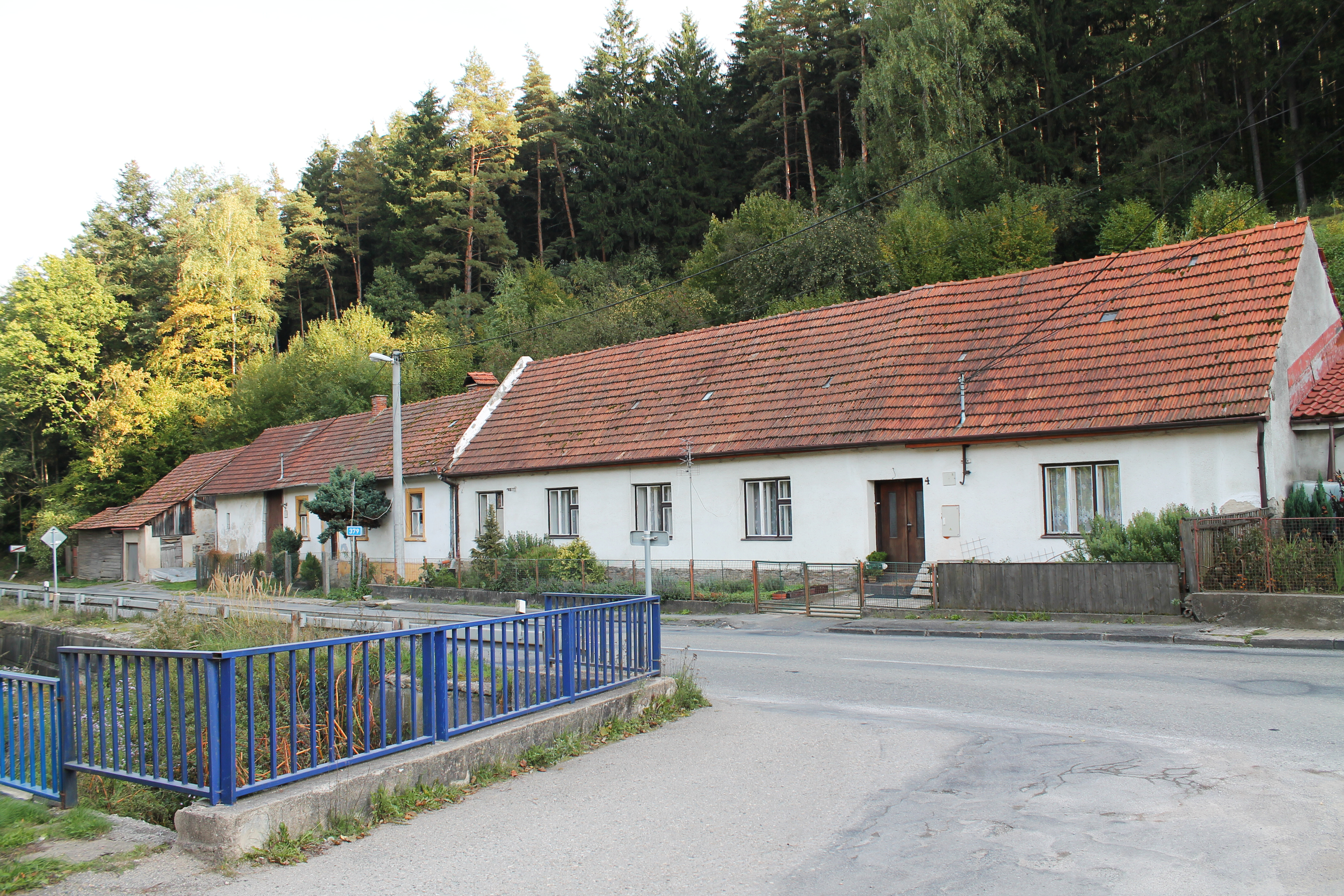
- Centre of Žernůvka

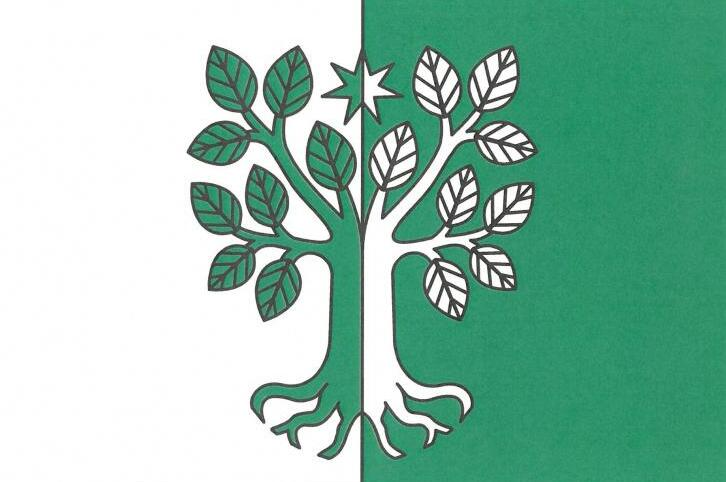
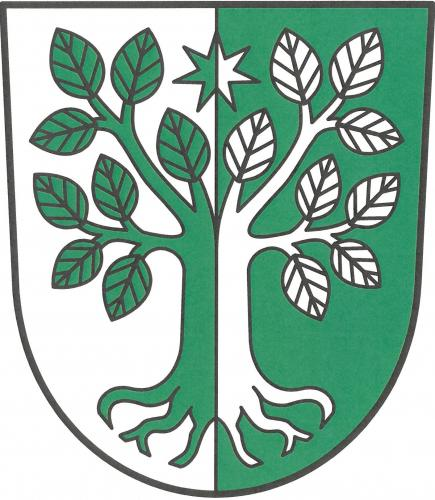
- Flag Coat of arms

- Location in the Czech Republic
- Coordinates: 49°20′31″N 16°22′36″E
- Country: Czech Republic
- Region: South Moravian
- District: Brno-Country
- First mentioned: 1390

Area
  - Total: 3.93 km^{2} (1.52 sq mi)
- Elevation: 445 m (1,460 ft)

Population (2026-01-01)
  - Total: 71
  - Density: 18/km^{2} (47/sq mi)
- Time zone: UTC+1 (CET)
  - Summer (DST): UTC+2 (CEST)
- Postal code: 666 01
- Website: www.nelepec-zernuvka.cz

Nelepeč-Žernůvka is a municipality in Brno-Country District in the South Moravian Region of the Czech Republic. It has about 70 inhabitants.

Nelepeč-Žernůvka lies approximately 24 kilometres (15 mi) north-west of Brno and 164 km (102 mi) south-east of Prague.

== Administrative division ==
Nelepeč-Žernůvka consists of two municipal parts (in brackets population according to the 2021 census):

- Nelepeč (18)
- Žernůvka (86)

== Demographics ==
Historical population
Year	Pop.	±%
1869	125	—
1880	132	+5.6%
1890	129	−2.3%
1900	136	+5.4%
1910	151	+11.0%
1921	136	−9.9%
1930	119	−12.5%
1950	144	+21.0%
1961	158	+9.7%
1970	166	+5.1%
1980	149	−10.2%
1991	140	−6.0%
2001	107	−23.6%
2011	92	−14.0%
2021	104	+13.0%
Source: Censuses
