= Volovets Raion =

Former subdivision of Zakarpattia Oblast, Ukraine

Volovets Raion Воловецький район
- Raion
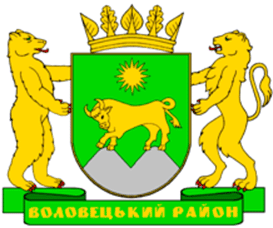
- Flag Coat of arms

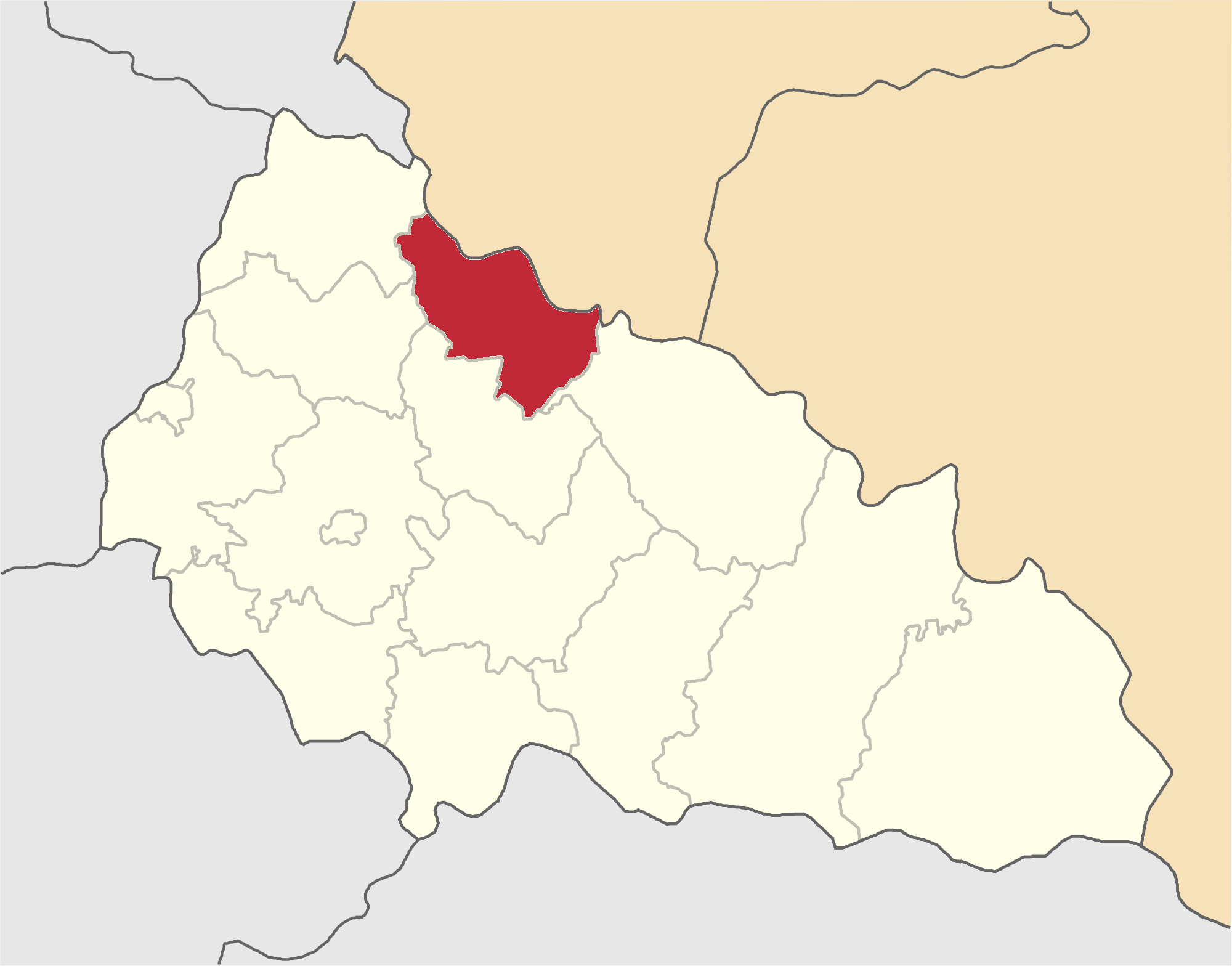
- Coordinates: 48°46′41.92″N 23°3′20.39″E
- Country: Ukraine
- Oblast: Zakarpattia Oblast
- Established: 1946
- Disestablished: 18 July 2020
- Admin. center: Volovets
- Subdivisions: List: — city councils; — settlement councils; — rural councils; Number of localities: — cities; — urban-type settlements; 24 — villages; — rural settlements

Area
  - Total: 544 km^{2} (210 sq mi)

Population (2020)
  - Total: 23,709
  - Density: 43.6/km^{2} (113/sq mi)
- Time zone: UTC+02:00 (EET)
  - Summer (DST): UTC+03:00 (EEST)
- Area code: 380-3136
- Website: Volovets Raion

Volovets Raion (Ukrainian: Воловецький район) was a raion of Zakarpattia Oblast in western Ukraine. Its administrative center was the urban-type settlement of Volovets. The raion was abolished and its territory was merged into Mukachevo Raion on 18 July 2020 as part of the administrative reform of Ukraine, which reduced the number of raions of Zakarpattia Oblast to six. The last estimate of the raion population was 23,709 (2020 est.).

== See also ==
- Administrative divisions of Zakarpattia Oblast
