= Ust-Chorna =

Rural locality in Zakarpattia Oblast, Ukraine

Ust-Chorna Усть-Чорна
- Rural settlement
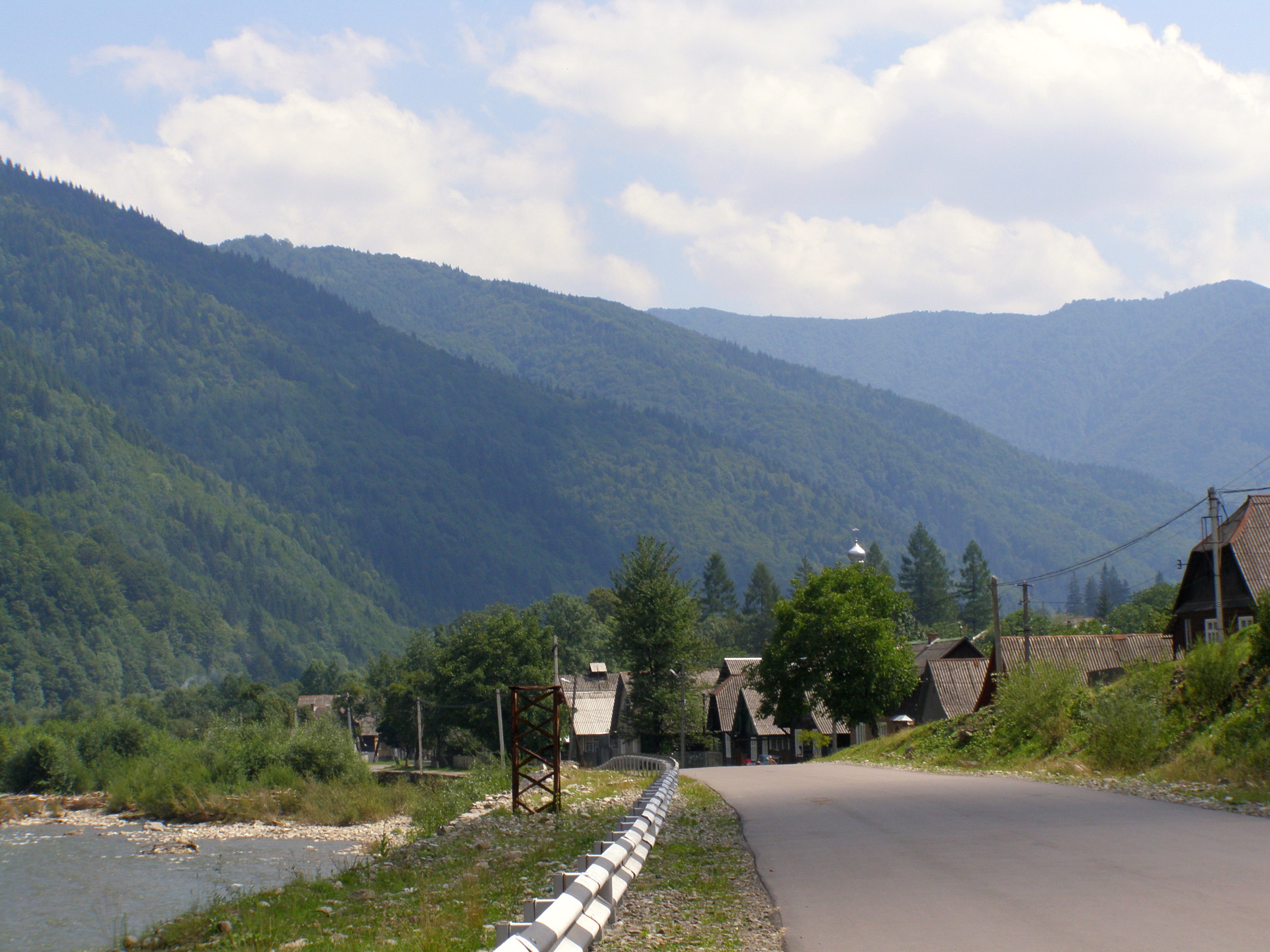
- View of the mountains surrounding Ust-Chorna.

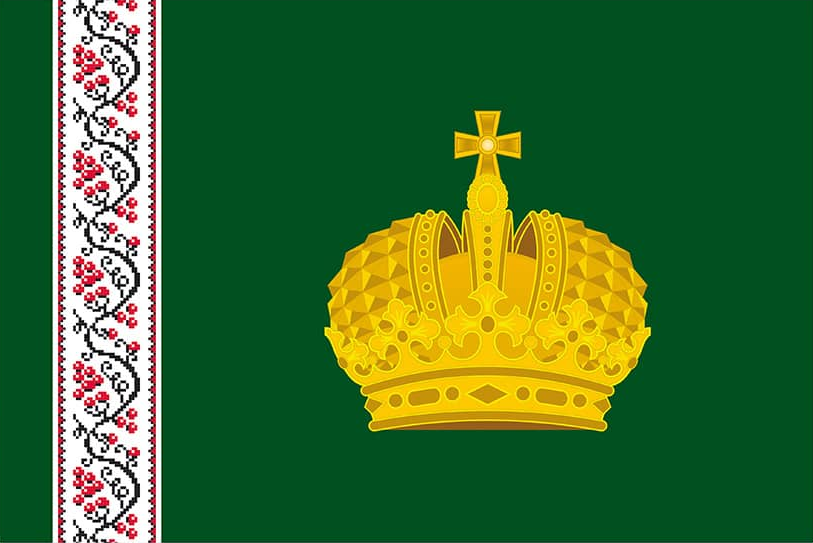
- Flag
- Interactive map of Ust-Chorna
- Location of Ust-Chorna in Zakarpattia Oblast Location of Ust-Chorna in Ukraine
- Coordinates: 48°19′09″N 23°56′20″E
- Country: Ukraine
- Oblast: Zakarpattia Oblast
- Raion: Tiachiv Raion
- Established: 1760s
- Town status: 1957
- Elevation: 536 m (1,759 ft)

Population (2022)
  - Total: ▼1,547
- Time zone: UTC+2 (EET)
  - Summer (DST): UTC+3 (EEST)
- Postal code: 90520
- Area code: +380 3134
- Website: rada.info/rada/04349805

Ust-Chorna (Rusyn and Ukrainian: Усть-Чорна; German: Königsfeld; Hungarian: Királymező; Slovak: Usť-Čorna or historically Kraľovo Pole) is a rural settlement in Tiachiv Raion, Zakarpattia Oblast, western Ukraine. The settlement's population was 1,456 as of the 2001 Ukrainian Census. Current population: 1,547 (2022 estimate).

== History ==
Until 26 January 2024, Ust-Chorna was designated urban-type settlement. On this day, a new law entered into force which abolished this status, and Ust-Chorna became a rural settlement.

== Demographics ==
Native language according to the 2001 Ukrainian census:

Native languages in Ust-Chorna
	percent
Ukrainian	93.3%
German	4.3%
Russian	1.5%
Hungarian	0.8%
Slovak	0.1%
others	0.0%
