= Svaliava Raion =

Former subdivision of Zakarpattia Oblast, Ukraine

Svaliava Raion Свалявський район
- Raion
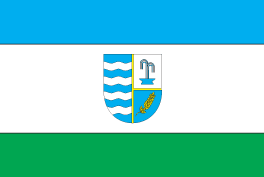
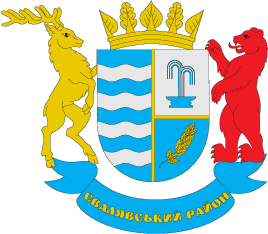
- Flag Coat of arms

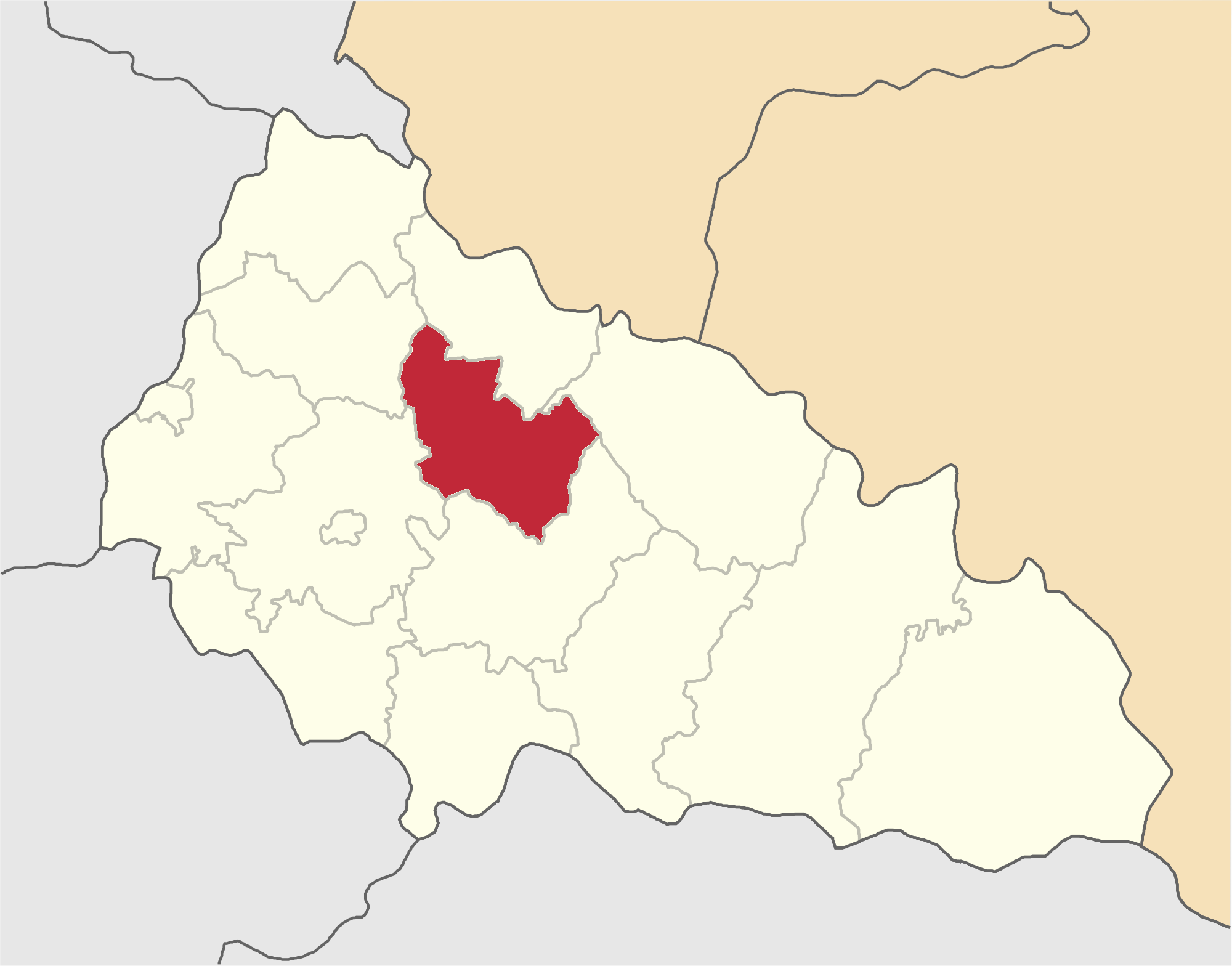
- Coordinates: 48°32′59.68″N 22°59′26.79″E
- Country: Ukraine
- Oblast: Zakarpattia Oblast
- Established: 1956
- Disestablished: 18 July 2020
- Admin. center: Svaliava
- Subdivisions: List: — city councils; — settlement councils; — rural councils; Number of localities: — cities; — urban-type settlements; 28 — villages; — rural settlements

Area
  - Total: 673 km^{2} (260 sq mi)

Population (2020)
  - Total: 54,138
  - Density: 80.4/km^{2} (208/sq mi)
- Time zone: UTC+02:00 (EET)
  - Summer (DST): UTC+03:00 (EEST)
- Area code: 380-3133
- Website: http://www.svalyava-vlada.gov.ua/

Svaliava Raion (Ukrainian: Свалявський район) was a raion of Zakarpattia Oblast in western Ukraine. Its administrative center was the city of Svaliava. The raion was abolished and its territory was merged into Mukachevo Raion on 18 July 2020 as part of the administrative reform of Ukraine, which reduced the number of raions of Zakarpattia Oblast to six. The last estimate of the raion population was 54,138 (2020 est.).

== See also ==
- Administrative divisions of Zakarpattia Oblast
