= Zhdeniievo =

Rural locality in Zakarpattia Oblast, Ukraine

Zhdeniievo Жденієво Szarvasháza
- Rural settlement
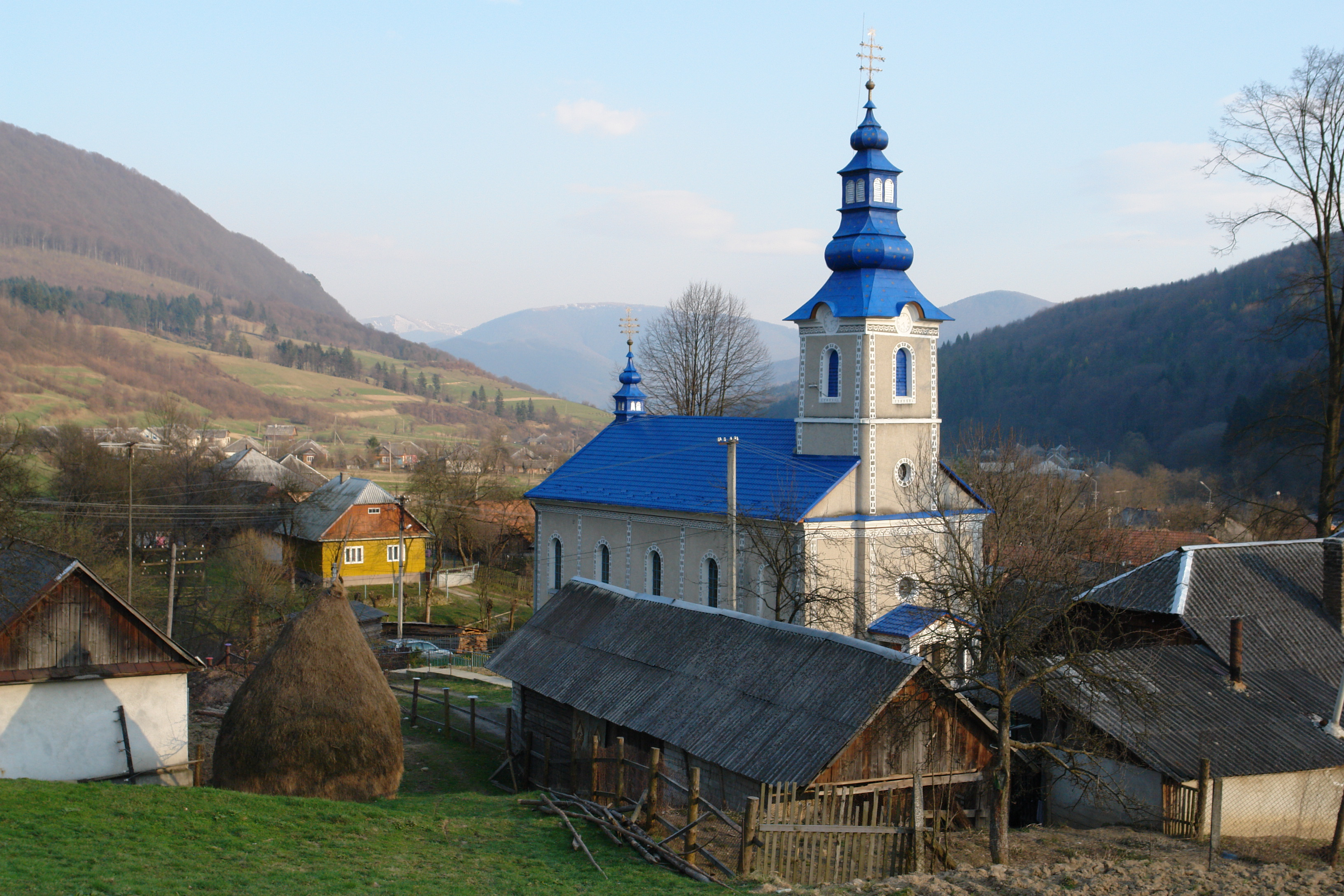

- Location of Zhdeniievo in Zakarpattia Oblast Location of Zhdeniievo in Ukraine
- Coordinates: 48°46′14″N 22°58′46″E
- Country: Ukraine
- Oblast: Zakarpattia Oblast
- Raion: Mukachevo Raion
- Town status since: 1981

Government
  - Town Head: Vasyl Hodovanets
- Elevation: 405 m (1,329 ft)

Population (2022)
  - Total: 1,074
- Time zone: UTC+2 (EET)
  - Summer (DST): UTC+3 (EEST)
- Postal code: 89120
- Area code: +380 3136
- Website: http://rada.gov.ua/

Zhdeniievo (Ukrainian: Жденієво; Hungarian: Szarvasháza, Russian: Ждениево) is a rural settlement in Mukachevo Raion, Zakarpattia Oblast, in western Ukraine. Zhdeniievo's population was 1,128 as of the 2001 Ukrainian Census. Current population: 1,074 (2022 estimate).

== History ==
Until 26 January 2024, Zhdeniievo was designated urban-type settlement. On this day, a new law entered into force which abolished this status, and Zhdeniievo became a rural settlement.
