= Solotvyno =

Rural settlement in Zakarpattia Oblast, Ukraine

Solotvyno Солотвино Slatina (Romanian) Aknaszlatina (Hungarian)
- Rural settlement
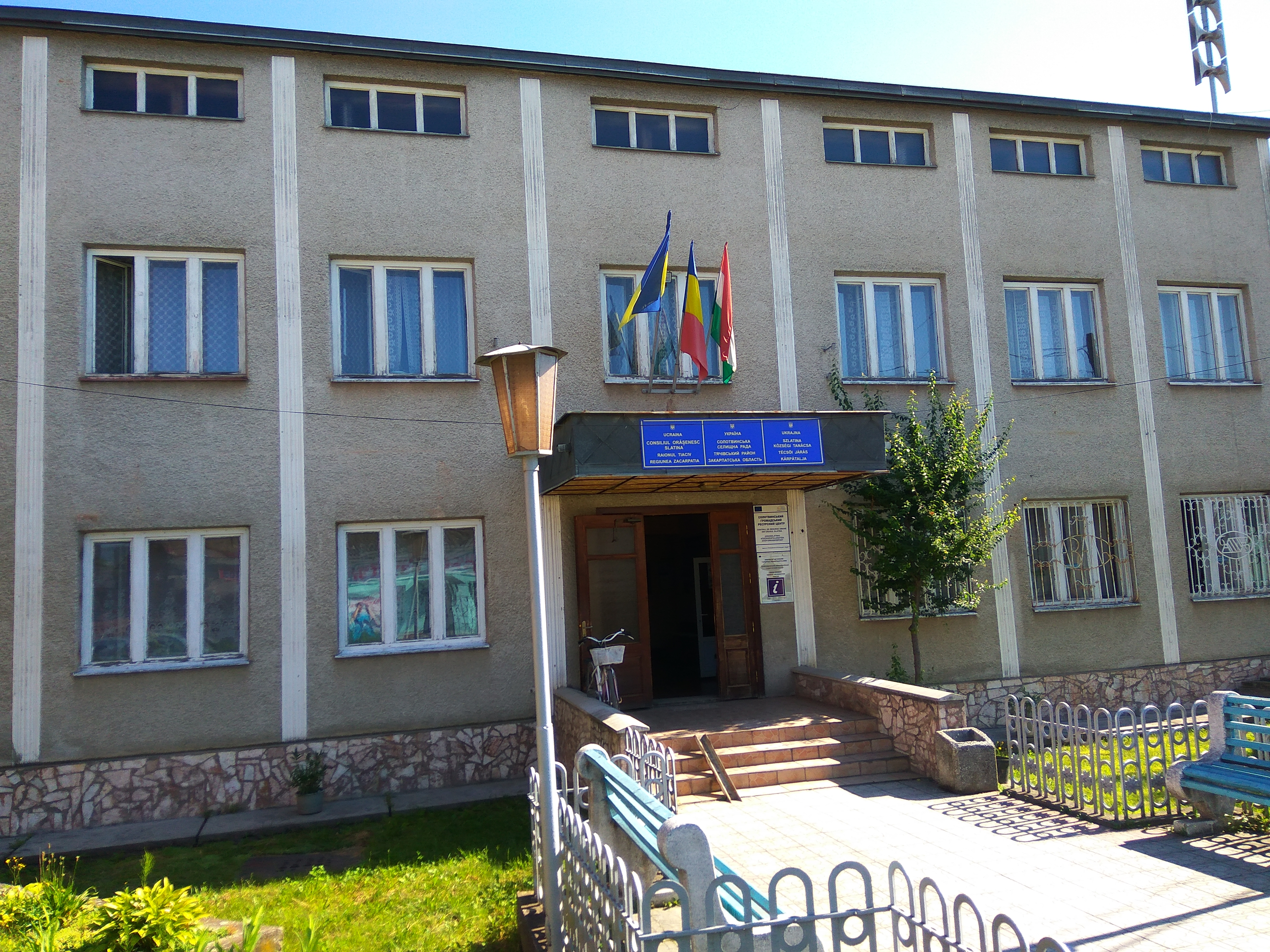
- Solotvyno Settlement council building

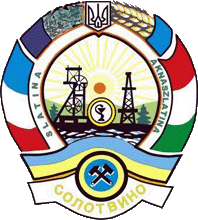
- Coat of arms
- Interactive map of Solotvyno
- Location within Zakarpattia Oblast Location within Ukraine
- Coordinates: 47°57′20″N 23°52′16″E
- Country: Ukraine
- Oblast: Zakarpattia Oblast
- Raion: Tiachiv Raion

Area
  - Total: 11.10 km^{2} (4.29 sq mi)
- Elevation: 283 m (928 ft)

Population (2022)
  - Total: 8,391
  - Density: 755.9/km^{2} (1,958/sq mi)
- Time zone: UTC+2 (EET)
  - Summer (DST): UTC+3 (EEST)
- Postal codes: 90575—90578
- Area code: +380 3134
- KOATUU: 2124455900

Solotvyno (also Solotvina; Ukrainian: Солотвино; Romanian: Slatina; Hungarian: Aknaszlatina or Faluszlatina; Rusyn: Солотвино; Slovak: Slatinské Doly; Yiddish: סעלאָטפֿינע, Selotfine) is a rural settlement in Tiachiv Raion, Zakarpattia Oblast, Ukraine, located adjacent to Romania, on the right bank of the Tisza River opposite the Romanian city of Sighetu Marmației. The current population is 8,391 (2022 estimate).

== History ==
Solotvyno was first mentioned c. 1360. The former town was burned down by the Tatars in 1241. In 1910, the town had a population of 2,330, the majority of whom were Hungarian. In 1920, with the collapse of the Austro-Hungarian empire, the town was divided in two, with the northern part of the right bank of the Tisza river becoming a part of the newly formed Czechoslovakia. The southern part became Sighet in Romania.

In March 1939 the area was invaded and annexed by Hungary. Almost the entire Jewish population was murdered in the Holocaust. In April 1944, Hungarian authorities established a ghetto in the Solotvino as part of the wider ghettoization of the region, confining Jews in overcrowded, unsanitary conditions that led to rampant starvation and disease. On 25 May 1944, the remaining Jews of Solotvino were deported on a single train carrying 3,317 people to Auschwitz, where the majority were murdered in gas chambers on arrival.

After World War II, Solotvino with the rest of Carpathian Ukraine became part of Ukraine in the Soviet Union. Under Soviet rule, Solotvyno's salt works were nationalized and integrated into the state-run Ukrsolprom, with extraction peaking at 451,000 tonnes per year in the 1970s, representing around 10% of Ukraine's total salt production. Speleotherapy, pioneered in Solotvyno during Soviet times, saw the 1968 founding of an experimental allergological hospital in Mine No. 8, with Mine No. 9’s underground chambers officially opened in 1976 to treat asthma and other respiratory diseases as a sanctioned USSR medical therapy.

According to the 2001 Ukrainian Census, the majority of the population in the city is Romanian. In 2001, 56.97% of the 8,956 inhabitants spoke Romanian as their native language, while 14.54% spoke Ukrainian, 24.3% Hungarian, and 3.18% Russian. Until 26 January 2024, Solotvyno was designated urban-type settlement. On this day, a new law entered into force which abolished this status, and Solotvyno became a rural settlement.

== Geography ==
The village is located in the eastern part of Zakarpattia Oblast, on the right bank of the Tisza River, between Rakhiv and the district center Tiachiv, which is located 24 kilometers from Solotvyno. The village's name comes from the nearby salt mine.

The territory of the village has a flat relief. The climate is temperate continental with warm summers and mild winters. South-westerly winds prevail throughout the year.

The Solotvino rock salt deposit is located near the village of Solotvino.

The settlement is the final stop of the Ukrainian section of the railway, which runs from Lviv to Transcarpathia.

Climate data for Solotvyno, Ukraine
Month	Jan	Feb	Mar	Apr	May	Jun	Jul	Aug	Sep	Oct	Nov	Dec	Year
Mean daily maximum °C (°F)	0 (32)	4 (39)	11 (52)	14 (57)	20.5 (68.9)	24 (75)	25.5 (77.9)	24.8 (76.6)	20.9 (69.6)	15.1 (59.2)	6.6 (43.9)	2.3 (36.1)	14.1 (57.3)
Daily mean °C (°F)	−2.5 (27.5)	0.0 (32.0)	5.5 (41.9)	9.5 (49.1)	14.3 (57.7)	18.0 (64.4)	19.3 (66.7)	18.5 (65.3)	14.8 (58.6)	9.7 (49.5)	3.0 (37.4)	−0.6 (30.9)	9.1 (48.4)
Mean daily minimum °C (°F)	−5 (23)	−4 (25)	0 (32)	5 (41)	8 (46)	12 (54)	13.0 (55.4)	12.1 (53.8)	8.7 (47.7)	4.2 (39.6)	−0.6 (30.9)	−3.4 (25.9)	4.2 (39.5)
Source: Accuweather

== Demographics ==
As of the 2001 Ukrainian census, Solotvyno had a population of 8,956 which decreased to 8,391 in early 2022. The exact linguistic composition of the town was as follows:

Languages in Solotvyno
	percent
Romanian	56.9%
Hungarian	24.3%
Ukrainian	14.5%
Russian	3.2%
German	0.8%
others	0.1%

== Tourist attractions ==
The city has a salt mine museum, in the southwestern part of the village, with traces of ancient salt mines from Roman times, the Gortsy salt mine. There is an archaeological monument dating from the 9th century BC to 4th century AD, and the Kunigunda salt lake (salt concentration 146–150 ‰).

== Notable residents ==
- Robert Maxwell (1923–1991), British MP, business owner, born here when the village was part of the First Czechoslovak Republic.
- Štěpán Barabáš (1914-2009), member of Czechoslovak army in exile during WWII, airman in RAF.

== Gallery ==
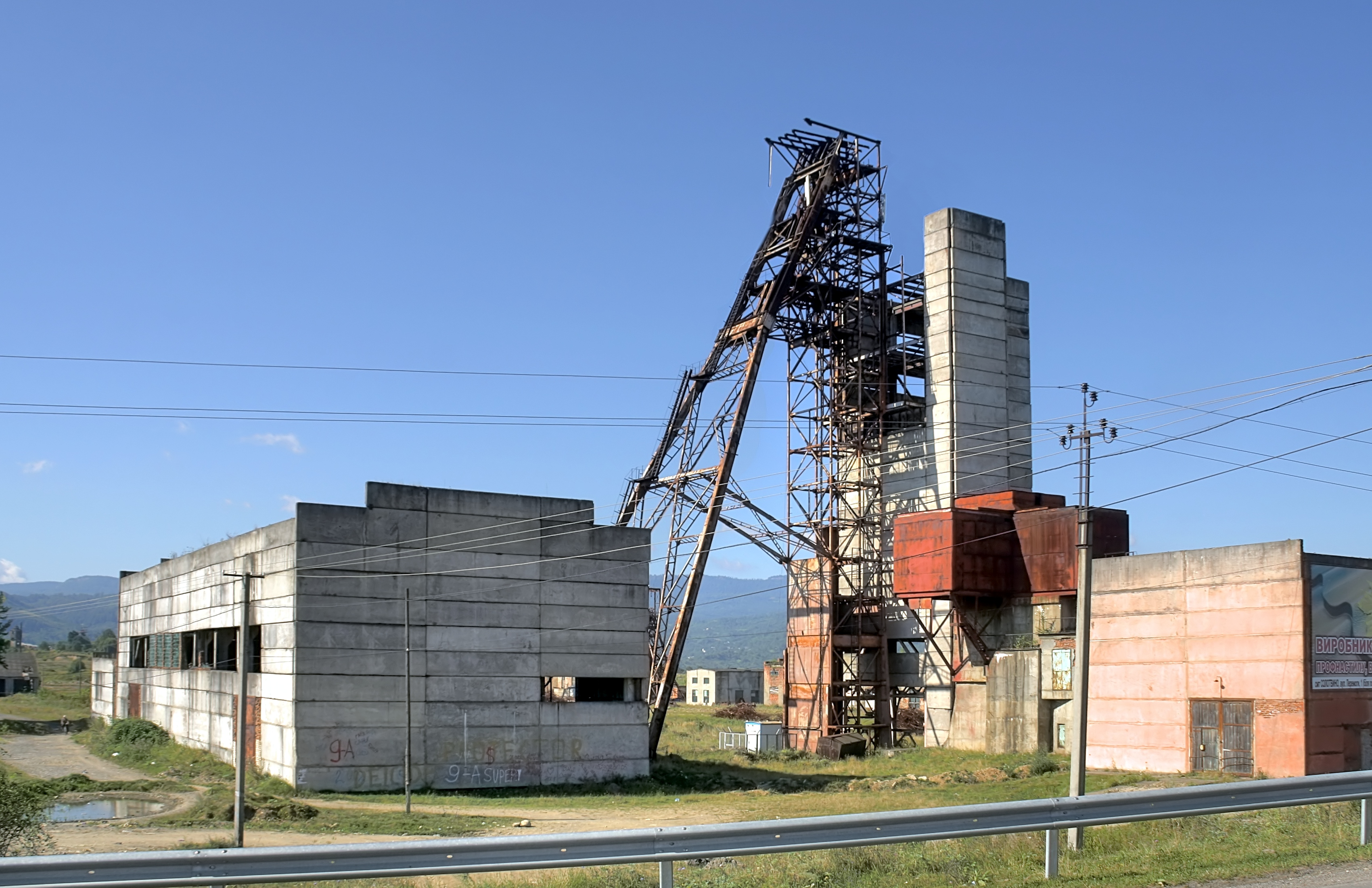
A salt mine in the town of Solotvyno

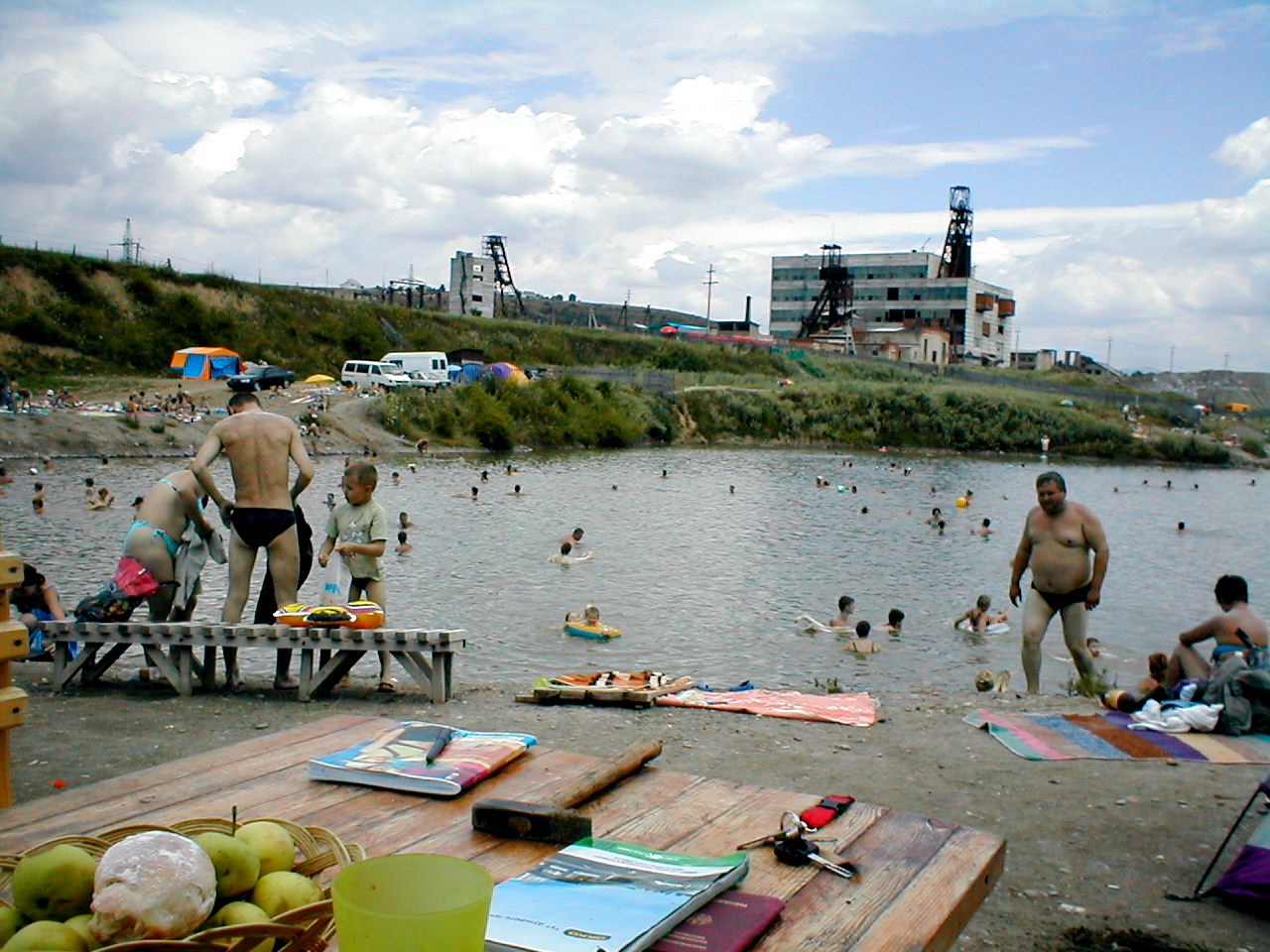
Recreation camp, "El dorado"

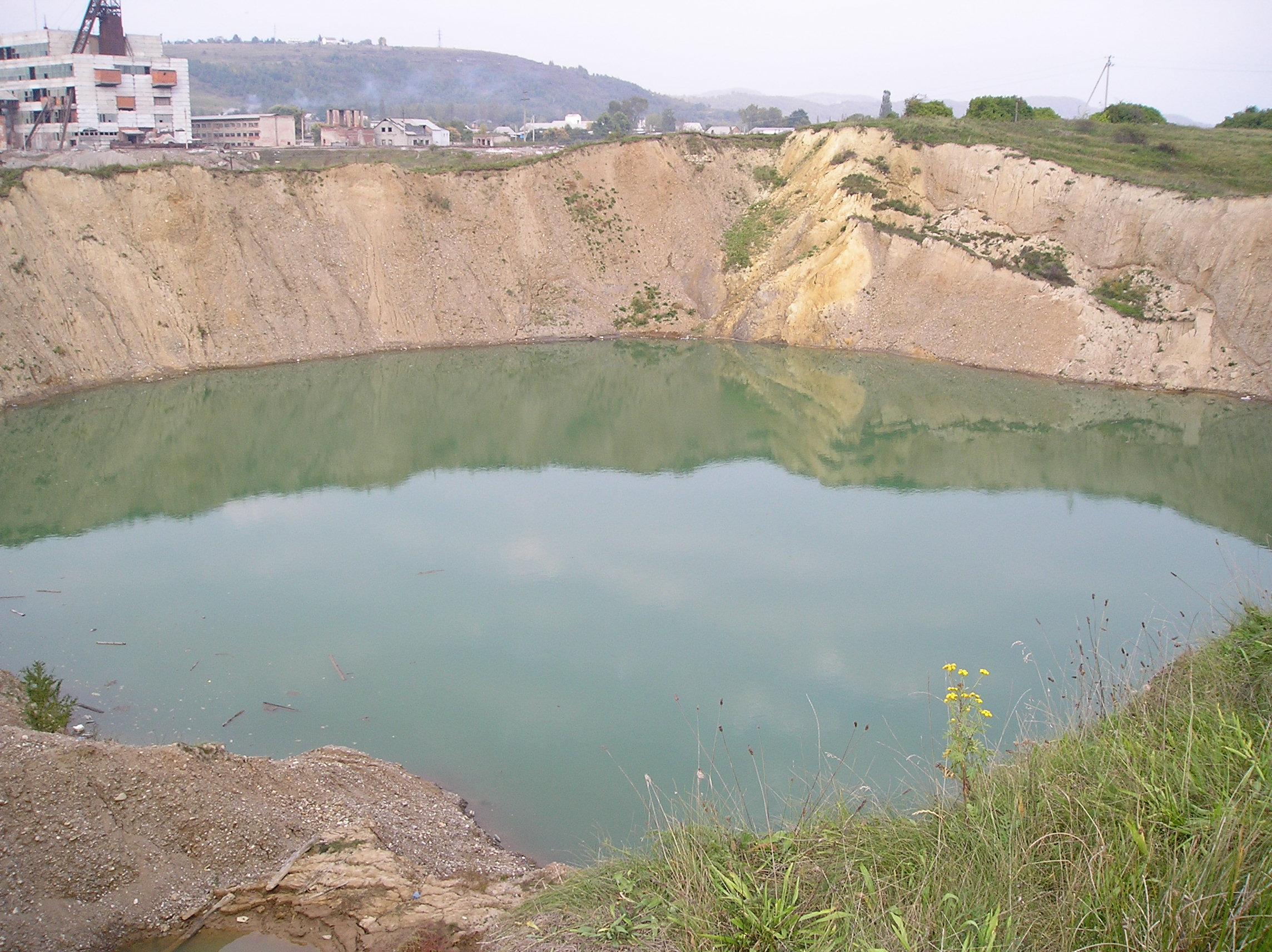

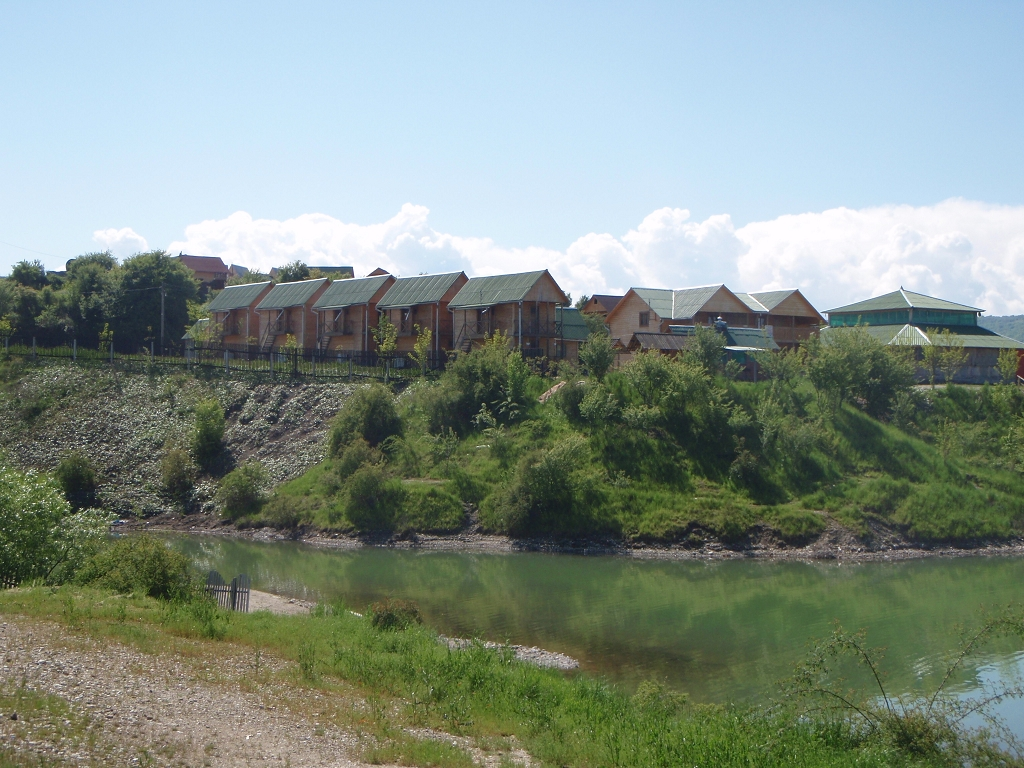

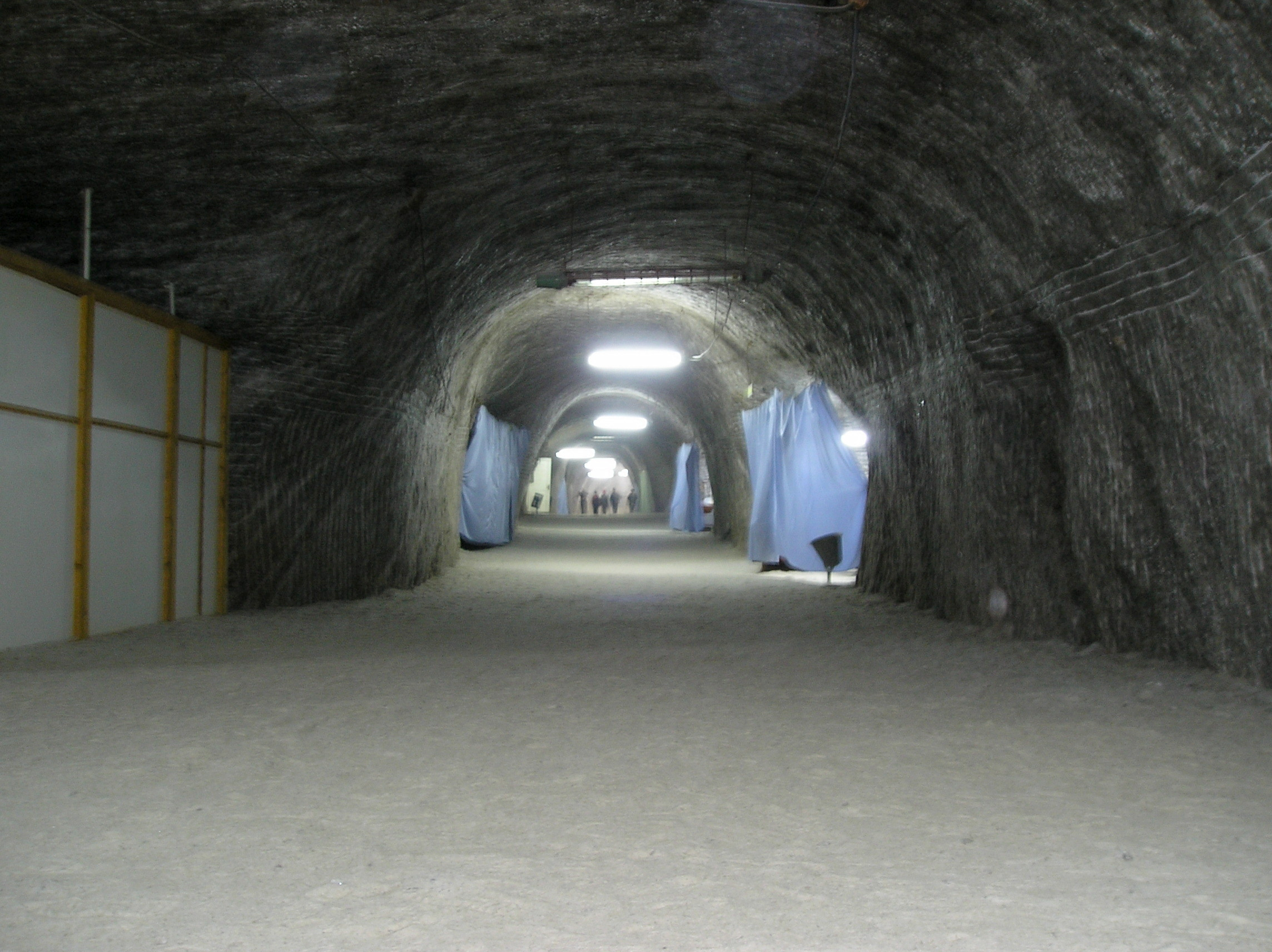
Underground office of the hospital

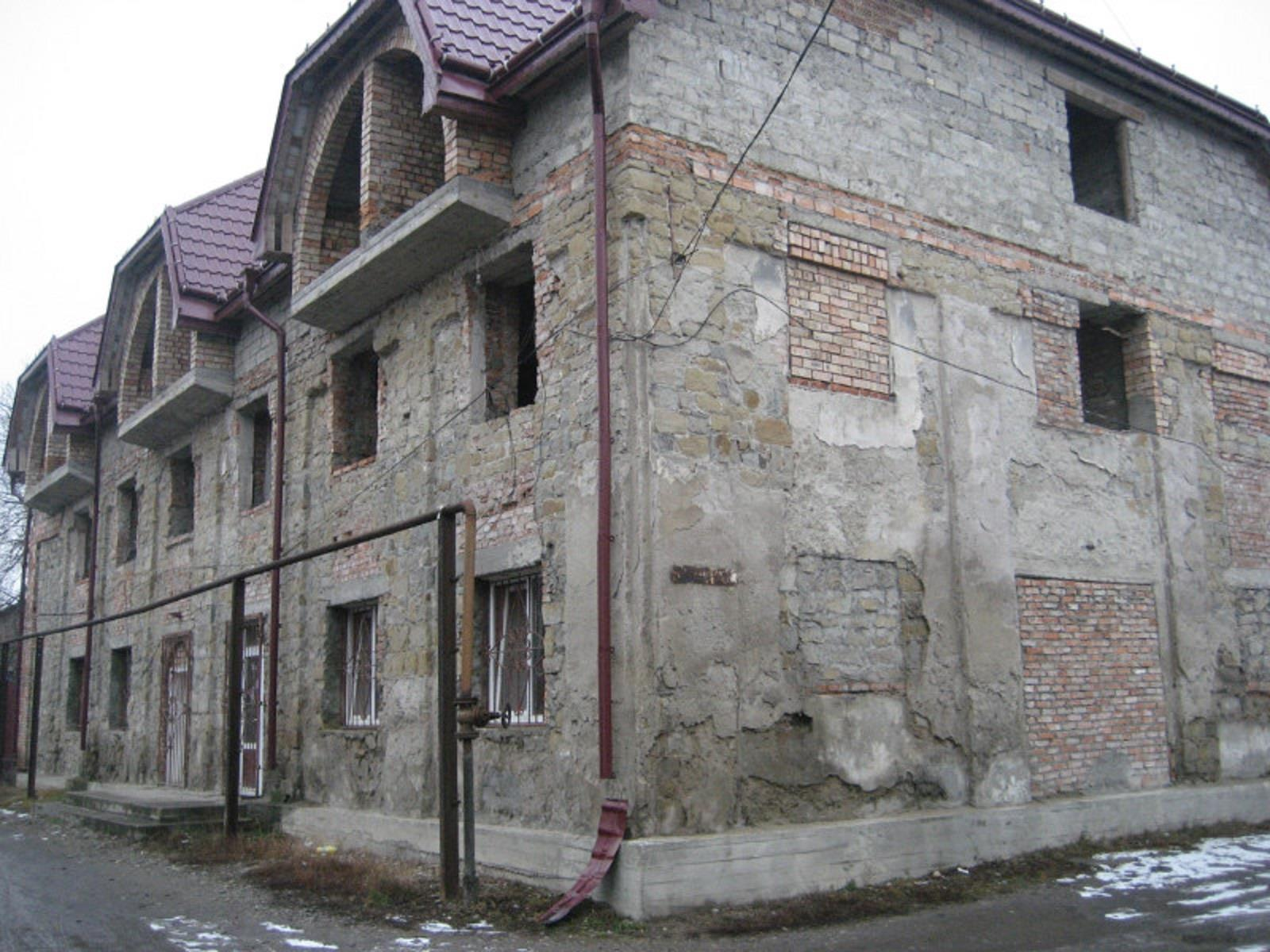
Former synagogue

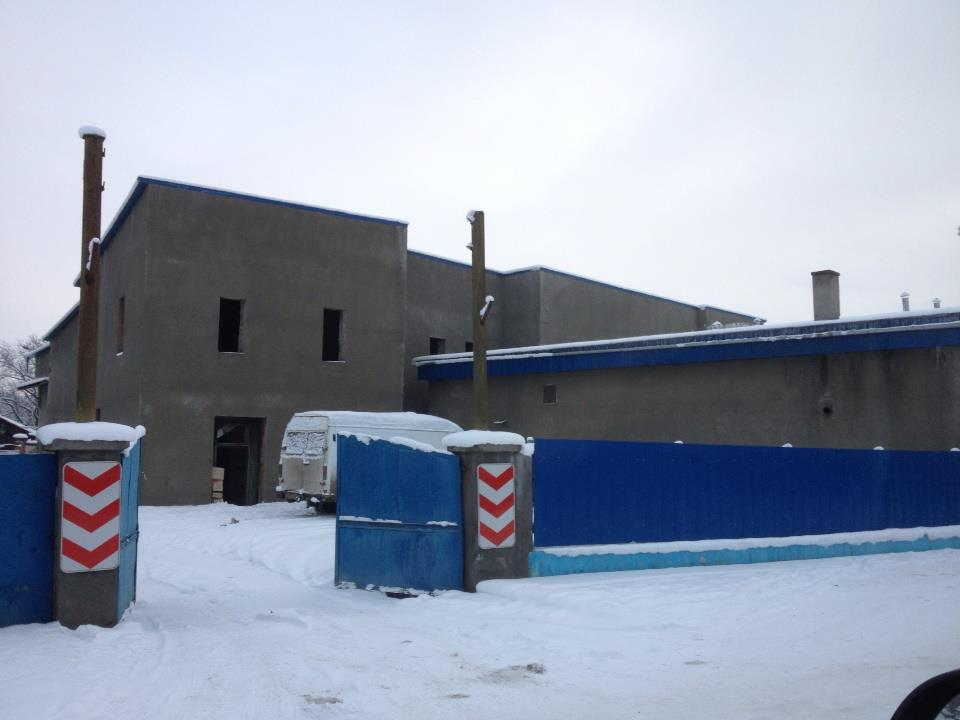
Former synagogue, now bakery

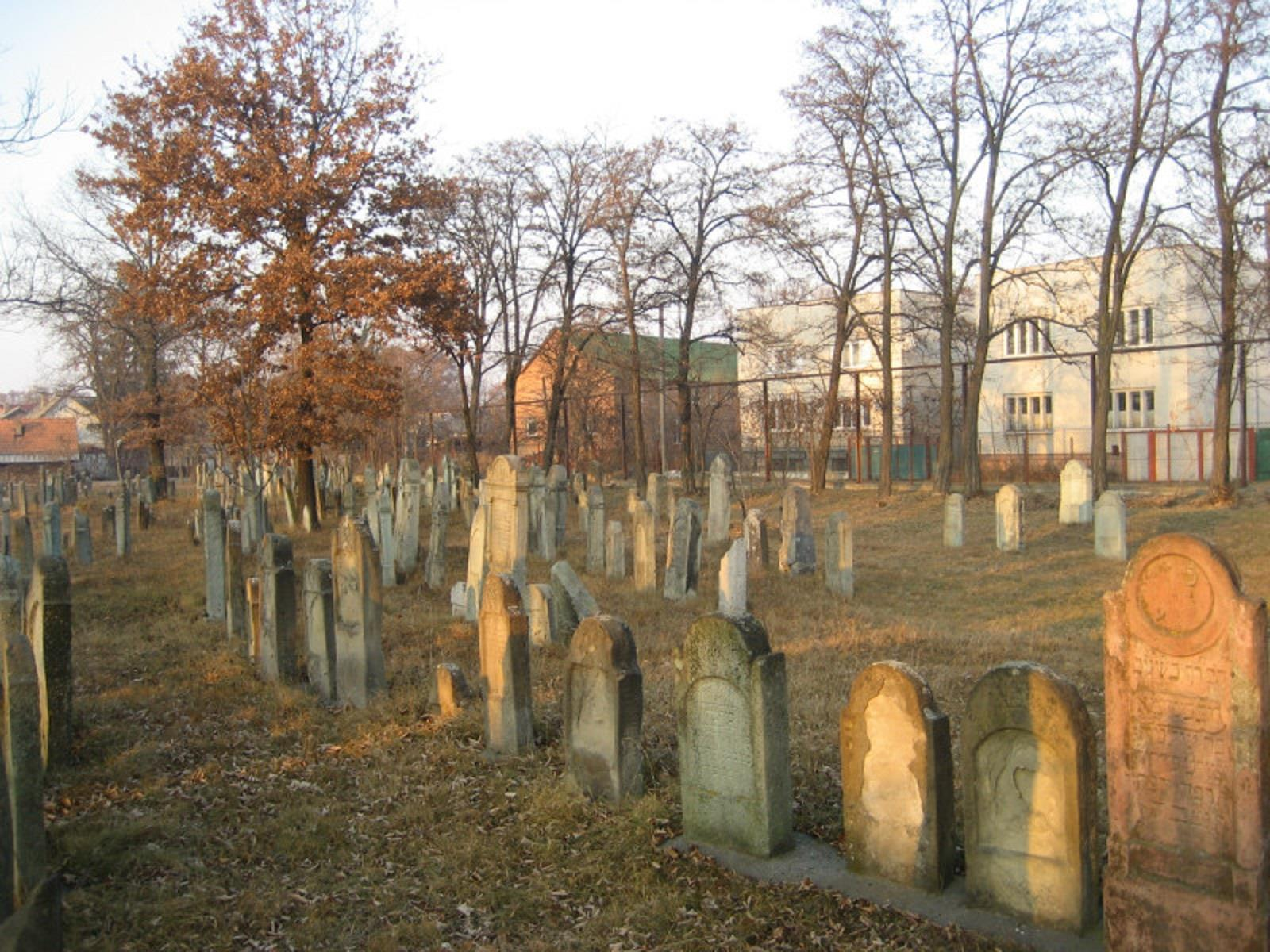
Old Jewish cemetery

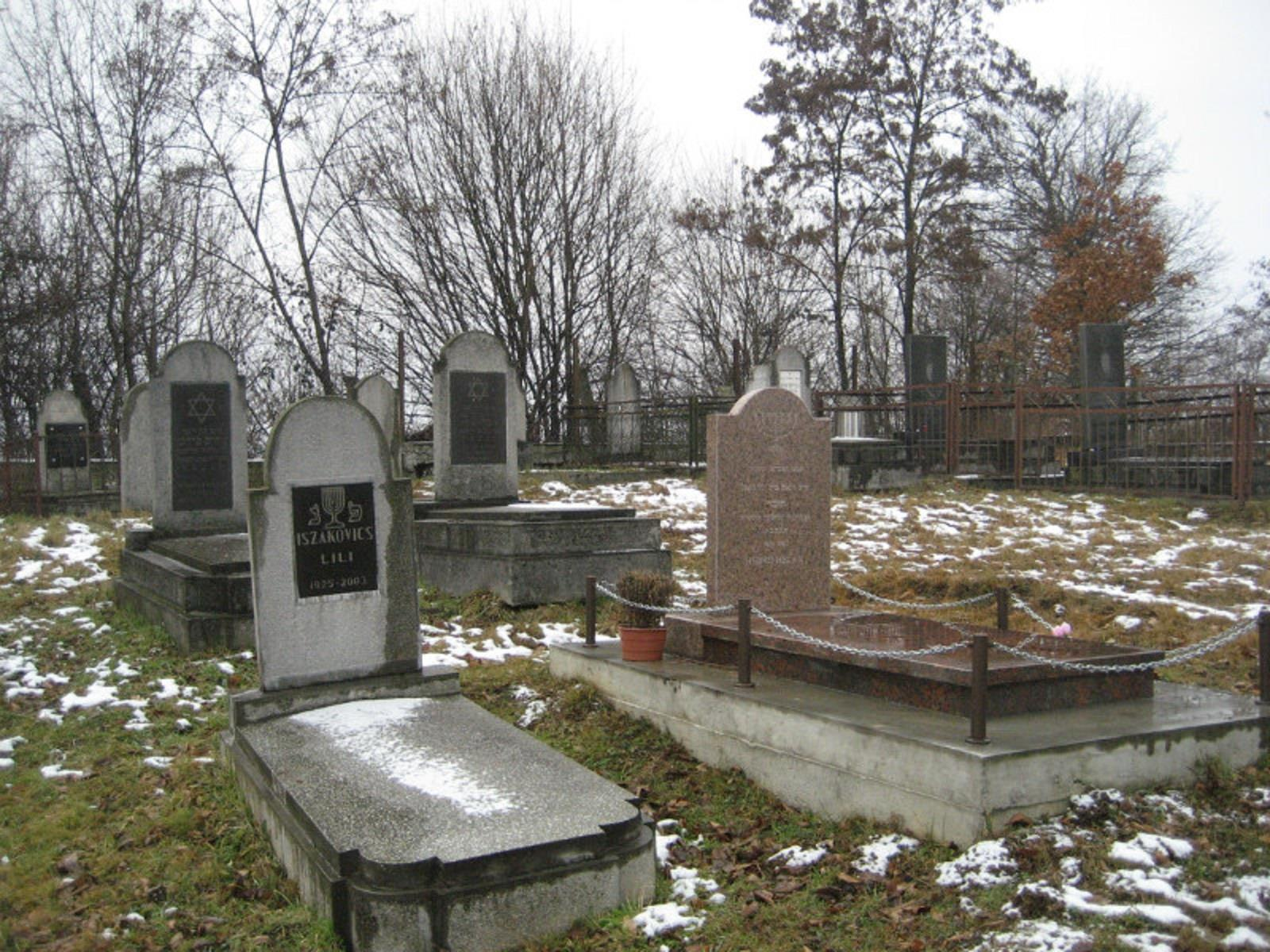
New Jewish cemetery

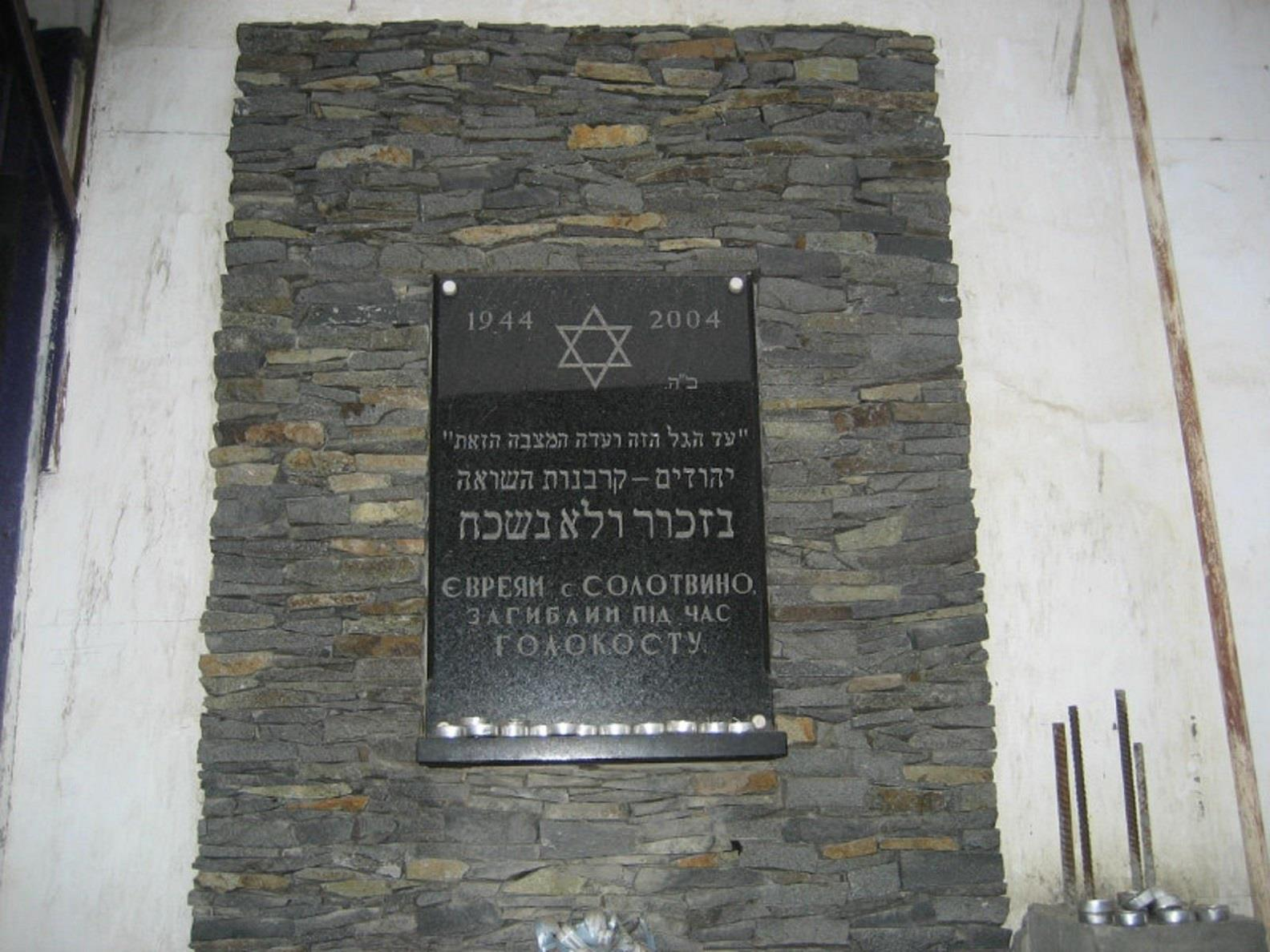
Jewish memorial plaque
