= Svaliava =

City in Zakarpattia Oblast, Ukraine

Svaliava Свалява
- City
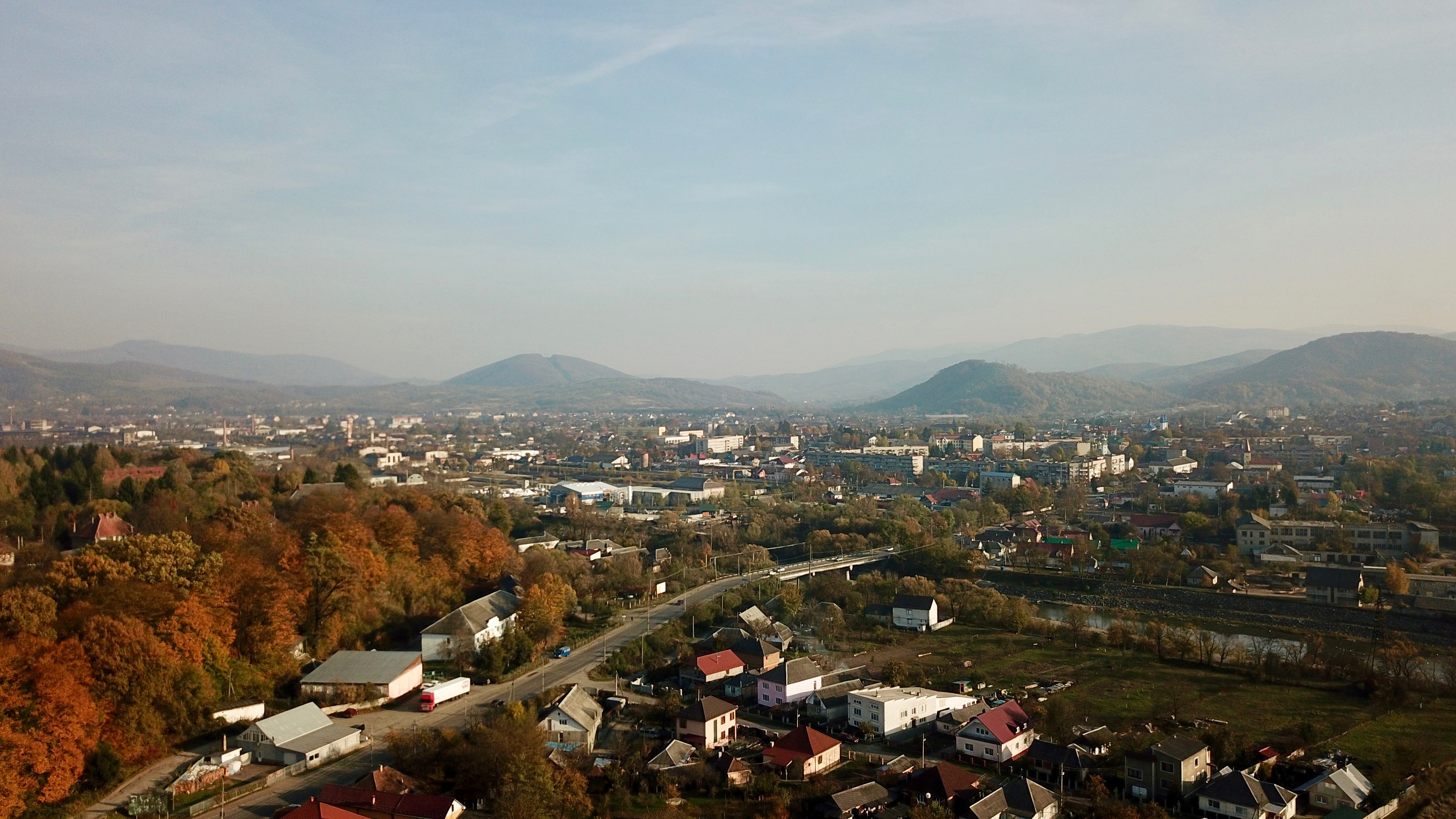
- View of Svaliava

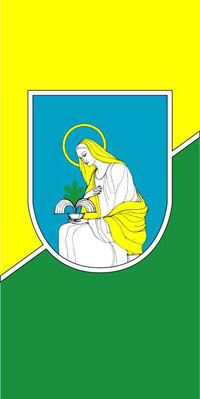
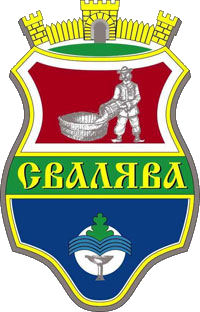
- Flag Coat of arms

- Location of Svaliava Svaliava (Ukraine)
- Coordinates: 48°32′50″N 22°59′10″E
- Country: Ukraine
- Oblast: Zakarpattia Oblast
- Raion: Mukachevo Raion
- Hromada: Svaliava urban hromada
- Founded: 12th century
- Incorporated: 1957

Government
  - Mayor: Ivan Lanyo

Population (2022)
  - Total: 17,068
- Time zone: UTC+1 (CET)
  - Summer (DST): UTC+2 (CEST)
- Postal code: 89300
- Area code: +380-3133
- Climate: Dfb
- Website: https://www.svalyava.org/

Svaliava (Ukrainian: Свалява, IPA: [swɐˈlʲɑwɐ]) is a city located on the Latorytsia River in Zakarpattia Oblast in western Ukraine. It was the administrative center of the former Svaliava Raion (district) until its abolition in 2020, now it is located in Mukachevo Raion. Population: 17,068 (2022 estimate).

== Etymology ==
Due to the city's complex history, there are also alternative names for it in other languages, including:

- Rusyn: Свалява, romanized: Svaliava;
- Hungarian: Szolyva;
- Slovak: Svaľava;
- Czech: Svaljava;
- German: Schwalbach, Schwallbach;
- Polish: Swalawa;
- Romanian: Svaliava;
- Russian: Свалява, romanized: Svalyava;
- Yiddish: סוואליאווע, romanized: Svalyave.

Although the name of the city is similar to the Gothic swaljawa meaning "swallow", the etymology of the name Svalyava comes from the Slavic roots Zolva, Solyava, Solva, meaning "salt". Its origin dates back to ancient times, when salt from the Marmaros County was transported to neighboring regions.

== Demographics ==
The 2001 census officially identified more than 94% of the population.

- Ukrainians 94.5%
- Russians 1.5%
- Hungarians 0.7%
- Slovaks 0.6%

== History ==
Swaljawa was first mentioned in the 12th century as a small settlement of a Hungarian feudal lord. In the 18th century, the village was annexed to the Austro-Hungarian Monarchy and was called Schwalbach. These lands later passed to the Count of Schönborn and his descendants. Gradually, Swaljawa became a multinational town with a significant part of the population being ethnic Germans.

According to the census of 1910, 47.1% of the population was Greek Catholic, 26.2% Jewish and 22.9% Roman Catholic. The Jewish population was deported to Auschwitz after the German occupation of Hungary, in May 1944, and most of them was murdered there.

After the Second World War a concentration camp was working near the town. Hungarian and German-born civilians (born between 1896, and 1926) were carried off by Soviet forces to the camp purely on the basis of their nationality. They were ordered to report for "malenkij robot" (a corrupted Russian for "small work"), but most of them – more than 20 thousand deportees were killed in the deathcamp after being subjected to various tortures (no water for days, glass powder mixed into their food). A further 50 000, or so Hungarians (not only men, but also women and children) were deported from Szolyva to the Soviet Union or Galicia. They were later exterminated. The site of the camp is now a memorial park established in 1994.

== Gallery ==
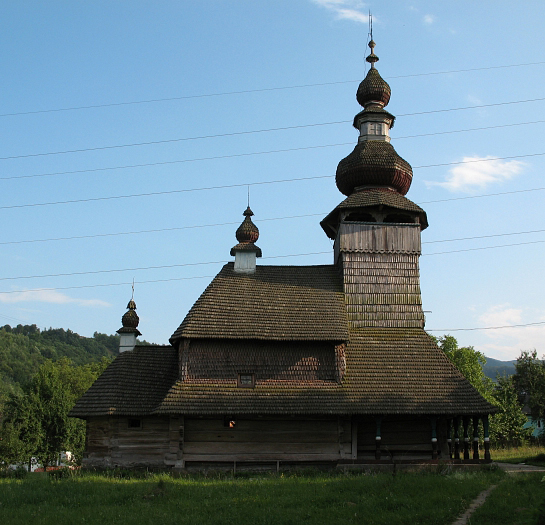
St. Nicholas Church

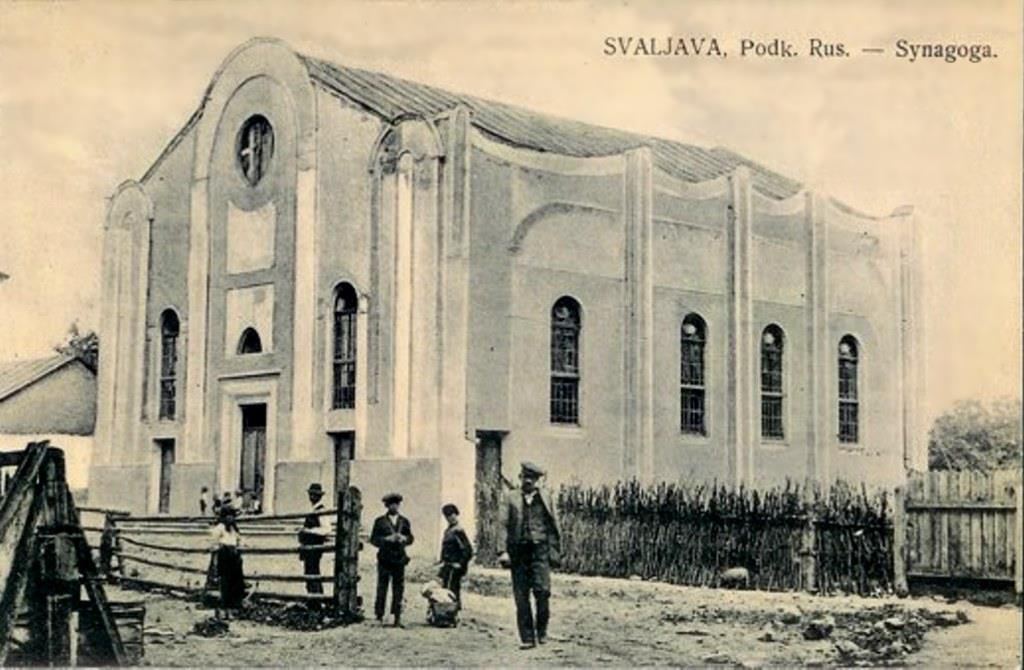
Synagogue in Svaliava

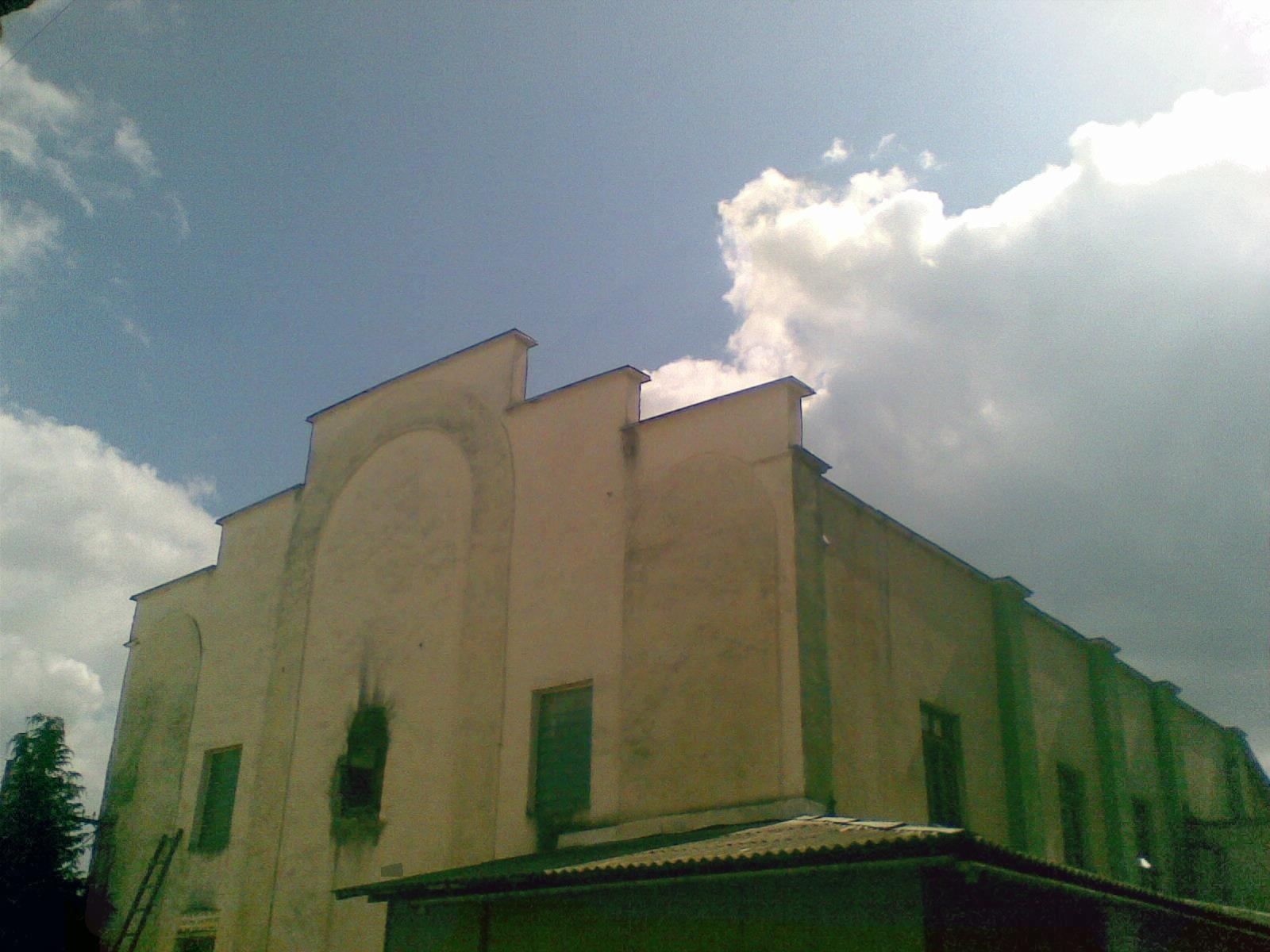
Former synagogue, now a bakery

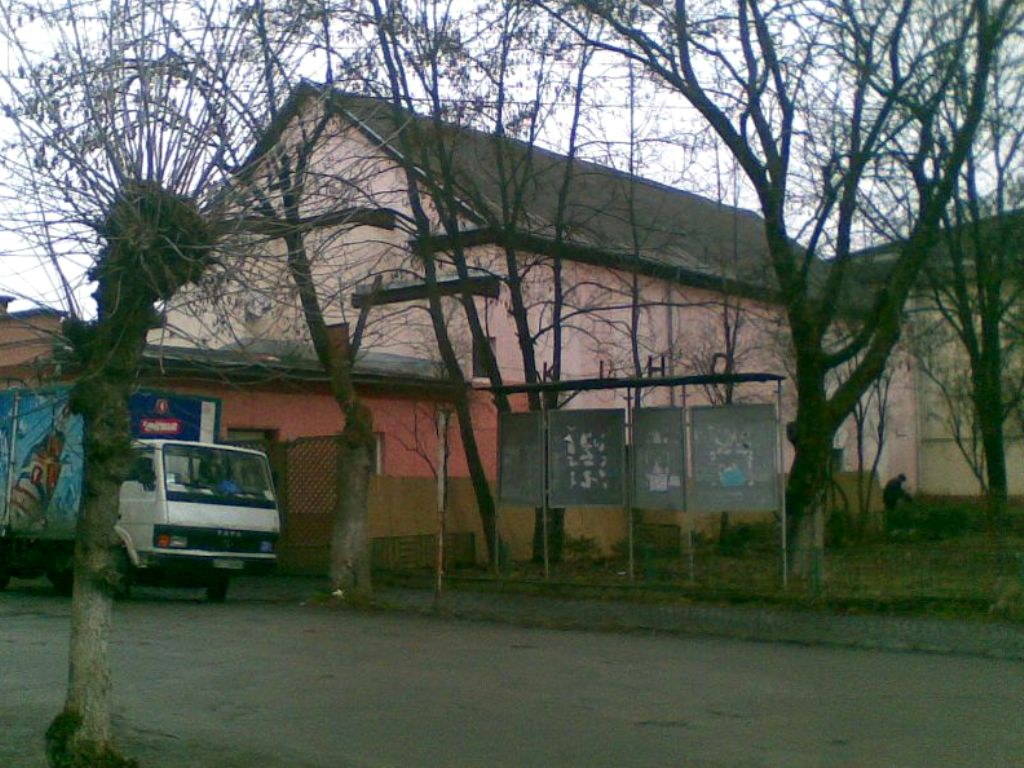
Former synagogue

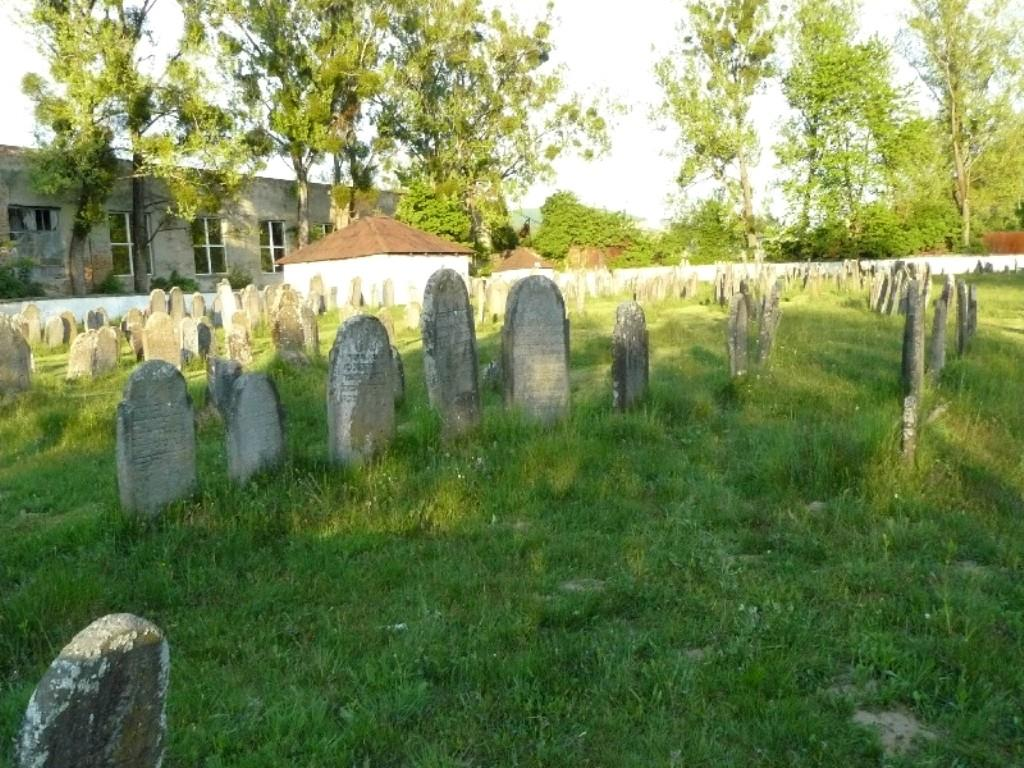
Jewish cemetery

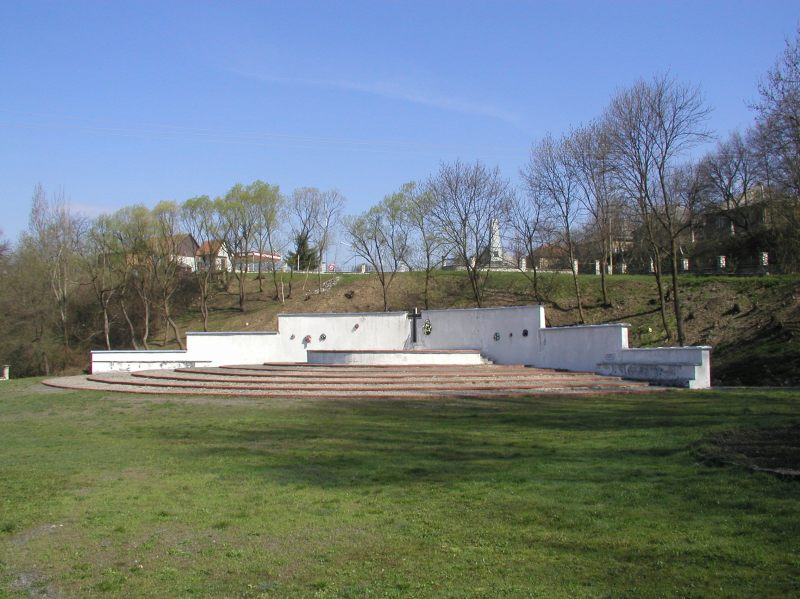
Memorial park
