= Vodica Monastery =

Serbian Orthodox monastery in Bačko Petrovo Selo, Serbia

- Манастир Водица; Manastir Vodica
- Location within Serbia
- Interactive map of Vodica Monastery

Monastery information
- Full name: Monastery of the Dormition of the Most Holy Mother of God
- Other name: Vodica
- Order: Serbian Orthodox
- Denomination: Eastern Orthodox
- Established: 17th century
- Mother house: Kovilj Monastery
- Dedication: Dormition of the Most Holy Mother of God
- Celebration: August 29
- Diocese: Eparchy of Bačka

Architecture
- Functional status: Active

Site
- Location: Bačko Petrovo Selo
- Country: Serbia
- Coordinates: 45.704833°N 20.071833°E
- Public access: yes

Vodica Monastery (Serbian: Манастир Водица, romanized: Manastir Vodica) is a Serbian Orthodox monastery located in Bačko Petrovo Selo, Serbia. It belongs to the Eparchy of Bačka of the Serbian Orthodox Church.

The Monastery of the Dormition of the Most Holy Mother of God in Bačko Petrovo Selo is better known as "Vodica". For three centuries, this "Vodica" monastery has been a spiritual and cultural destination of this region. People gathered at the holy well "Vodica", especially the sick, who were allegedly healed and recovered since the first mentions of this settlement.

== History ==
"Vodica" is located on the left bank of the Čik river on the Topola road, in the Petrovo Selo cadastral area. The monastery complex was built in an area that had been inhabited since the earliest times remembered by history.

In this area there are traces of organized life from before the Common Era, evidenced by archaeological sites near the monastery on the very bank of the Čik river. At this important site, in the 1960s, a Avar necropolis, grain pits, clay vessels, and various tools from the Stone and Bronze Ages were discovered.

The Bečej Museum holds Sarmatian vessels and weapons found at the archaeological site near the monastery.

In the 11th century, these areas became part of the state of the Hungarian king Stephen I, although they were sparsely populated due to the invasion of the Tatars and various plundering hordes. An interesting piece of information from 1247 is that King Béla IV, while touring the estates of a certain Count Pongrác, recorded the existence of the settlement of Peterevo, six kilometers from the present-day settlement, which is approximately the location of today's monastery.

After the Battle of Kosovo in 1389, the Serbian population retreated north towards Central Europe, into Hungary, before the Ottoman invasion. In 1412, this area was in the possession of the Serbian despot Đurađ Branković and remained under the rule of the Serbian despots until the arrival of the Ottomans in 1526.

After the signing of the Treaty of Karlowitz in 1699 and the departure of the Ottomans from these areas, a significant influx of Serbian population into these areas was recorded, along with the first mention of the monastery in Bačko Petrovo Selo.

In the parish chronicle, a tradition from 1711 is recorded, describing an event that led this place to become the spiritual center of the entire region. On the eve of the feast of the Dormition of the Most Holy Mother of God, a local resident named Milivoj, who suffered from eye disease, was grazing his flock here. In the afternoon hours, he had a vision of a female figure who addressed him as son. She told him that she was the Mother of God and that at the place where she stood water would spring forth, with which he would heal his eyes and which would be healing for all believers. Milivoj informed the local priest about this event, who immediately came to the site and became convinced that water had appeared at the place of the Mother of God's appearance—water that smelled of myrrh. On the very feast of the Dormition of the Most Holy Mother of God, a lity went from the village to this place, where the people became convinced of the truth of this miracle. Although there was much debate about the healing properties of this water, many sick people found healing and spiritual strengthening here. Believing in the power of healing, people came to the monastery on foot as pilgrims from near and far surroundings.

Over time, a masonry well was dug at that place, and a large wooden cross was placed next to it. The church-municipal administration appointed a church trustee who took care of the donations of the growing number of people coming here. During the 19th century, there were attempts, due to the arrival of a large number of people on the Marian feasts and on the feast of Fiery Mary, to build a lodging house for the people. This idea was realized in 1872. Then, with donations from the faithful, a church of fired brick covered with shingles measuring six fathoms was built, and next to it, two years later, a modest building for the people made of rammed earth and covered with reeds was erected. In the parish chronicle, various testimonies about healings in this monastery were recorded. It was recorded that this place was respected not only among Orthodox but also among Roman Catholic Hungarians. Therefore, a Bačko Petrovo Selo Roman Catholic in 1892 donated a statue of the Mother of God to the monastery as a sign of gratitude. The well was renovated in 1960. A new well with a metal ring was made and a new cross was erected.

== Present ==
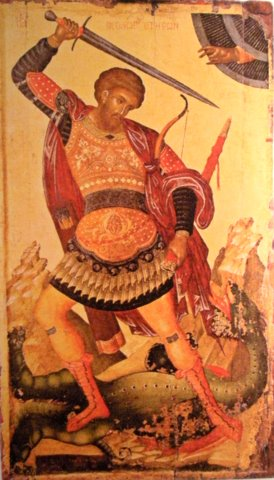
A particle of the relics of Saint Theodore Tiron was brought in 1976 and is still kept in the monastery.

The Administrative Board of the Serbian Orthodox Church in 1972, during the service of priest Miroslav Naumov (later a priest in Sombor, where he served until his death), decided that the present chapel-church, dedicated to the Dormition of the Most Holy Mother of God (Great Dormition) on August 29, be built from voluntary contributions of local residents; this is today the slava of the monastery. With the blessing of the late Bishop Nikanor of Bačka, today's church was built in 1973. The church, 9 meters long and 3 meters wide, was built with donations from the faithful. The iconostasis and icons in the church were made by academic painter Dragan Bjelogrlić from Novi Sad, modeled on the iconostasis of the chapel of the Patriarchal Court in Sremski Karlovci. During the 1980s, all of today's accompanying buildings in the monastery were built. Later work was continued by the priest, archpriest Stevan Krunić.

A particle of the relics of Saint Theodore Tiron was brought in 1976 and is still kept in the monastery.

By a high decision of the late bishop Sava of Šumadija, who as administrator of the Eparchy of Bačka issued a decree on July 14, 1988, this place was officially proclaimed a monastery.

The Monastery of the Dormition of the Most Holy Mother of God in Bačko Petrovo Selo is a metochion of the Holy Archangel Monastery in Kovilj. It is cared for by the Kovilj monastic brotherhood.

With the blessing of Bishop Irinej of Bačka and the efforts of the brotherhood of Kovilj Monastery, since 2007 a center for the treatment of addiction called "Land of the Living" has been housed in the monastery.

On all feasts of the Mother of God, the Divine Liturgy is served in the monastery, when people from the village and surroundings come in large numbers.

Besides the monastery's slava, held every year on August 29, people gather at this place exceptionally, even more than on the day of the slava itself; namely, on July 29 an evening service and night vigil are held, that is, on the eve of the feast of Martyr Marina (popularly known as the feast of "Fiery Mary"), and on July 30 the Divine Liturgy is also held.
