= Kosivka =

Kosivka may refer to:

- Kosivka, Kirovohrad Oblast, a village in Ukraine
- Kosivka, Odesa Oblast, a village in Ukraine
- Kosiv Raion, a raion (district) of Ivano-Frankivsk Oblast, Ukraine
- Kosivska River, Ukraine
- Kosovskoye Lake, Ukraine

== See also ==
- Kosivska Poliana, a village in Zakarpattia Oblast, Ukraine
