= Tisza =

River in Central and Eastern Europe

Tisza Tysa Tisa
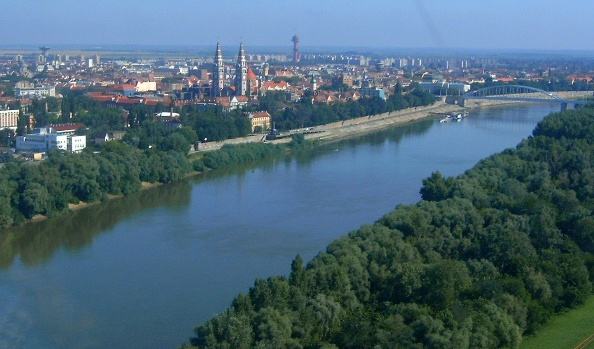
- The Tisza in Szeged, Hungary

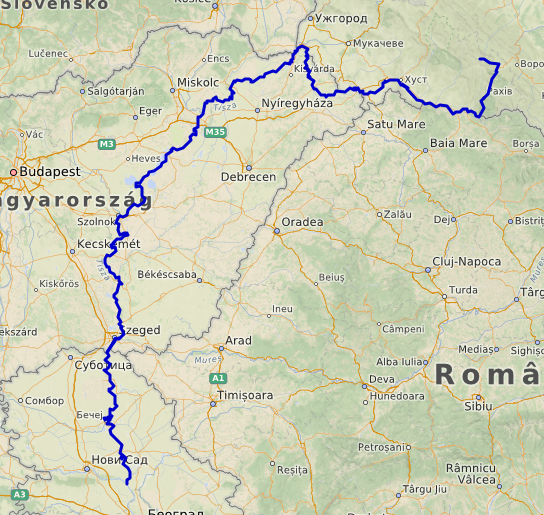
- Map of the Tisza
- Native name: Тиса (Ukrainian); Тиса (Rusyn); Tisa (Romanian); Tisza (Hungarian); Tisa (Slovak); Тиса / Tisa (Serbian)

Location
- Countries: Ukraine; Romania; Hungary; Slovakia; Serbia
- Towns: Sighetu Marmației; Khust; Tokaj; Szolnok; Szeged; Bečej

Physical characteristics
- Source: Confluence of the White Tisza and Black Tisza
  - location: Immediately upstream of Rakhiv, Ukraine in the Eastern Carpathians
  - coordinates: 48°4′29″N 24°14′40″E
  - elevation: 2,020 m (6,630 ft)
- Mouth: Danube
  - location: Downstream of Novi Sad, Serbia
  - coordinates: 45°8′17″N 20°16′39″E
  - elevation: 70 m (230 ft)
- Length: 966 km (600 mi)
- Basin size: 157,186 km^{2} (60,690 mi^{2})
- Discharge
  - location: Novi Slankamen (near mouth)
  - average: (Period: 1971–2000) 920.1 m^{3}/s (32,490 cu ft/s)
  - minimum: 160 m^{3}/s (5,700 cu ft/s)
  - maximum: 4,500 m^{3}/s (160,000 cu ft/s)
- Discharge
  - location: Szeged
  - average: (Period: 1971–2000) 890.5 m^{3}/s (31,450 cu ft/s) (Period: 2011–2020) 784.7 m^{3}/s (27,710 cu ft/s)
- Discharge
  - location: Szolnok
  - average: (Period: 1971–2000) 578.9 m^{3}/s (20,440 cu ft/s)
- Discharge
  - location: Tokaj
  - average: (Period: 1971–2000) 468.8 m^{3}/s (16,560 cu ft/s)
- Discharge
  - location: Vásárosnamény
  - average: (Period: 1971–2000) 340.6 m^{3}/s (12,030 cu ft/s) (Period: 2011–2020) 321.18 m^{3}/s (11,342 cu ft/s)

Basin features
- Progression: Danube→ Black Sea
- River system: Danube River
- Tributaries
  - left: Vișeu; Iza; Tur; Someș; Crasna; Körös; Mureș; Bega
  - right: Tarac; Talabor; Rika; Borzhava; Bodrog; Sajó; Eger; Zagyva

The Tisza, Tysa, Tisa, or Theiss (see below) is one of the major rivers of Central and Eastern Europe. It was once called "the most Hungarian river" because it flowed entirely within the territory of the Kingdom of Hungary. Today, it crosses several national borders.

The Tisza begins near Rakhiv in Ukraine, at the confluence of the White Tisza and Black Tisza, at coordinates 48°4′29″N 24°14′40″E (the former rises in the Chornohora mountains; the latter in the Gorgany range). From there, it flows west, roughly following Ukraine's borders with Romania and Hungary, before adopting its onward southerly course. It briefly separates Slovakia from Győröcske in Hungary, beyond which both banks belong to Hungary (from northern border town Tiszabecs until the country's southern border) and the river flows about 90km or so west of the Romanian border, receiving many streams and traversing with many bends 200km as the crow flies, to reach Serbia. This occurs south of the Hungarian city of Szeged. Finally, it joins the Danube near the village of Stari Slankamen in Vojvodina, Serbia.

The Tisza drains an area of about 156,087 km^{2} (60,266 mi^{2}) and has a length of 966 km (600 mi) Its mean annual discharge is seasonally 792 m^{3}/s (28,000 cu ft/s) to 1,050 m^{3}/s (37,000 cu ft/s). It contributes about 13% of the Danube's total runoff.

Attila the Hun is said to have been buried under a diverted section of it.

== Names and etymology ==
The river was known as the Tisia in antiquity; other ancient names for it included Pathissus (Ancient Greek: Πάθισσος; later Latin: Tissus). It may be referred to as the Theiss in older English references, after the German name for the river, Theiß. It is known as the Tibisco in Italian, and in older French references (as for instance in relation to the naval battles on the Danube between the Ottoman Empire and the Habsburg Empire in the 17th and 18th centuries) it is often referred to as the Tibisque.

Another theory is that it is derived from Proto-Balto-Slavic *teišus meaning 'still, quiet' to describe the river.

Modern names for the Tisza in the languages of the countries it flows through include:

- Ukrainian: Тиса, romanized: Tysa, pronounced [ˈtɪsɐ];
- Romanian: Tisa, pronounced [ˈtisa];
- Hungarian: Tisza, pronounced [ˈtisɒ];
- Slovak: Tisa, pronounced [ˈtisa];
- Serbian: Тиса / Tisa, pronounced [tîsa].

== Regulation ==
The length of the Tisza in Hungary used to be 1,419 km (882 mi). It flowed through the Great Hungarian Plain, which is one of the largest flat areas in central Europe. Since plains can cause a river to flow very slowly, the Tisza used to follow a path with many curves and turns, which led to many large floods in the area.

After several small-scale attempts, István Széchenyi organised the "regulation of the Tisza" (Hungarian: a Tisza szabályozása) which started on August 27, 1846, and substantially ended in 1880. The new length of the river in Hungary was reduced to 966 km (600 mi) in total, with 589 km (366 mi) of dead channels and 136 km (85 mi) of new riverbed.

== Lake Tisza ==
In the 1970s, the building of the Tisza Dam at Kisköre started with the purpose of helping to control floods as well as storing water for drought seasons. However, the resulting Lake Tisza became one of the most popular tourist destinations in Hungary since it had similar features to Lake Balaton at drastically cheaper prices and was not crowded.

== Navigation ==
The Tisza is navigable over much of its course. The river opened up for international navigation only recently; previously, Hungary distinguished "national rivers" and "international rivers", indicating whether non-Hungarian vessels were allowed or not. After Hungary joined the European Union, this distinction was lifted and vessels were allowed on the Tisza.

== Wildlife ==
The Tisza has a rich and varied wildlife. Over 200 species of birds reside in the bird reserve of Tiszafüred. The flood plains along the river boast large amounts of diverse plant and animal life. In particular, the yearly "flowering" of the Tisza is considered a local natural wonder. The flowering attracts vast numbers of mayflies which is a well known spectacle.

In September 2020, colonies of magnificent bryozoans were discovered in the river.

== Pollution ==
In early 2000, there was a sequence of serious pollution incidents originating from accidental industrial discharges in Romania. The first, in January 2000, occurred when there was a release of sludge containing cyanide from a Romanian mine and killed 2000 tons of fish. The second, from a mine pond at Baia Borsa, northern Romania, resulted in the release of 20,000 m^{3} (710,000 cu ft) of sludge containing zinc, lead and copper occurred in early March 2000. A week later, the third spill occurred at the same mining site at Baia Borsa, staining the river black, possibly including heavy metals.

This series of incidents were described at the time as the most serious environmental disaster to hit central Europe since the Chernobyl disaster. Usage of river water for any purpose was temporarily banned and the Hungarian government pressed the Romanians and the European Union to close all installations that could lead to further pollution.

Examination of river sediments indicates that pollution incidents from mines have occurred for over a century.

== Geography ==
=== Drainage basin ===
The Tisza River is part of the Danube River catchment area. It is the tributary with the largest catchment area (~157,000 km^{2}). It accounts for more than 19% of the Danube river basin. The Tisza water system is shared by five countries: Ukraine (8%), Slovakia (10%), Hungary (29%), Romania (46%) and Serbia (7%).

The Tisza River Basin area and average discharge (period from 1946–2006) by country

Country	Area by country		Discharge by country		
Country	km^{2}	%	m^{3}/s	km^{3}	%
Hungary	46,213	29.4	47	1.5	5.7
Romania	72,620	46.2	468	14.8	56.4
Serbia	10,374	6.6	4.0	0.1	0.5
Slovakia	15,247	9.7	90	2.8	10.8
Ukraine	12,732	8.1	221	7.0	26.6
Tisza River Basin	157,186	100.0	830	26.2	100.0

The 1800–2500 m high ridge of the Carpathian Mountains create in a semi circle the northern, eastern and southeastern boundary of the Tisza catchment. The western - southwestern reach of the watershed is comparatively low in some places – on its Hungarian and Serbian parts it is almost flat. The area is divided roughly along the centreline by the Carpathian Mountains, east of which lies the 400–600 m high plateau of the Transylvanian Basin, and the plains to the west. The highest summits of the river basin reach 1948 m in the Low Tatras (Kráľova hoľa), 2061 m in the Chornohora Mountains (Hoverla), 2303 m in the Rodna Mountains (Pietrosul Rodnei) and even higher in the Retezat Mountains of the Southern Carpathians (Peleaga, 2509 m). Areas above elevations higher than 1600 m occupy only 1% of the total; 46% of the territory lies below 200 m. The Tisza River Basin in Slovakia is predominantly hilly area and the highest mountain peak in Kráľova hoľa - in the Low Tatras Mountain Range at 1948 m. The lowland area lies in the south, forming the northern edge of the Hungarian Lowland. The lowest point in Slovakia is the village of Streda nad Bodrogom in the eastern Slovak lowland (96 m) in the Bodrog River Basin. The Hungarian and Vojvodina (Serbia) part of the Tisza River Basin is a flat area bordered by small ranges of hills and mountains from the north and dominated by the Hungarian lowland.

Important hydrographic stations along the Tisza (full list):

Station		River kilometer (rkm)	Elevation (m)	Basin size (km^{2})	Average discharge (m^{3}/s)^{*}
Left	Right	River kilometer (rkm)	Elevation (m)	Basin size (km^{2})	Average discharge (m^{3}/s)^{*}
Lower Tisza
Near mouth		0	70	154,073.1	920.11
	Titel	8.7	70	153,965	920.28
Novi Bečej		66	70	144,007.8	893.72
	Bečej	73	71	143,994.6	892.81
	Bačko Petrovo Selo	87	72	143,585	891.29
	Mol	103	72	142,373.4	889.98
	Ada	104	72	142,373.4	889.98
	Senta	123.5	73	140,849.9	886.98
	Adorjan	137	73	140,746	886.73
	Novi Kneževac	144.5	73	139,717.5	885.36
Kanjiža		148.3	73	139,376.8	886.5
Srpski Krstur		156.8	73	138,857.7	888.69
Szeged		172	74	138,857.7	890.45
Middle Tisza
Maros		176	75	108,436.1	703.43
	Algyő	192	76	107,941	703.85
Mindszent		217.7	77	105,881.5	703.33
Körös		244	78	102,643.7	698.78
	Csongrád	246.2	78	75,520.5	583.04
Tiszaug		267.5	79	75,517	583.58
	Tiszakécske	274	79	75,056.1	583.42
Martfű		306.9	80	74,462.2	582.64
Vezseny		314	80	73,895.9	581.43
Tiszavárkony		322	80	73,895.9	581.33
Szolnok		334.6	81	72,889.4	578.92
	Zagyva	336	81	67,325	562.04
Szajol		344	81	66,713.4	560.39
	Nagykörű	363.7	82	66,581.2	559.85
Tiszabő		366	82	66,464.6	559.58
	Kőtelek	373.8	82	66,315.7	559.42
Tiszaroff		379.3	83	66,315.7	559.42
	Tiszasüly	384	83	66,315.7	559.42
Tiszabura		395.6	83	65,840.4	558.14
	Kisköre	403.5	83	65,624.9	557.58
Tiszafüred		430.5	88	63,967.2	553.34
	Tiszabábolna	442	88	63,346	551.54
	Tiszadorogma	446.2	88	63,346	551.14
Tiszacsege		453.9	89	63,164.8	550.87
	Ároktő	454.9	89	63,164.8	550.87
	Tiszakeszi	464.3	89	63,164.8	550.66
	Tiszapalkonya	484.7	90	62,557.7	549.31
	Tiszaújváros	486	90	62,557.7	549.11
Polgár		487.3	90	62,557.7	549.11
	Sajó	492	90	49,688.1	470.49
Tiszadob		500.2	91	49,600.6	470.25
Tiszadada		508.4	91	49,600.6	470.06
Tiszalök		518.2	93	49,443	469.85
	Tokaj	543.1	94	49,167.1	468.86
	Bodrog	544	94	34,856.5	353.75
Timár		549.4	95	34,810.3	353.66
Szabolcs		555	95	34,810.3	352.7
Balsa		557.7	96	34,810.3	353.31
Tiszabercel		569	97	34,713.3	352.7
	Cigánd	592	98	32,964.1	346.06
Dombrád		593.1	98	32,964.1	346.06
Tiszakanyár		597.3	98	32,964.1	346.06
Záhony		627.8	100	31,304.7	340.39
	Chop	630	100	31,304.7	340.39
Vásáros-namény		682	103	30,978.9	340.62
Upper Tisza
Szamos		686	104	11,870.1	202.13
	Jánd	690	105	11,870.1	201.96
Kisar	Tivadar	704	107	11,689.7	201.51
Tiszabecs		744.3	114	9,950	185.86
	Vylok	746	115	9,588.3	180.91
	Vynohradiv	767	137	9,366	180.91
Khust		783	157	7,877.8	153.54
Bushtyno		802	188	6,802	130.66
	Tiachiv	814	210	6,657.9	126.81
	Teresva	820	225	5,205.7	101.04
Sighetu Marmației		837	265	3,451	75.73
	Dilove	885	346	1,294.4	26.65
	Rakhiv	897	437	1,256.3	22.13

^{*}Period: 1971–2000

== Discharge ==
Average, minimum and maximum discharge of the Tisza River at Tiszabecs (Upper Tisza), Szolnok (Middle Tisza) and Senta (Lower Tisza).

Year	Discharge (m^{3}/s)								
Year	Senta			Szolnok			Tiszabecs		
Year	Min	Mean	Max	Min	Mean	Max	Min	Mean	Max
1991				118	368	1,550			
1992	132	689	2,415	58.7	424	1,460			
1993	90	537	1,860	61.6	363	1,510			
1994	90	662	1,743	66.9	462	1,500			
1995	251	800	1,768	101	557	1,450		286	
1996	188	769	2,174		440			173	
1997	306	884	1,952		509			204	
1998	360	1,125	2,308		625			288	
1999	326	1,170	2,820	136	704	2,360	60.4	255	1,510
2000	242	929	3,400	93	563	2,600	26.7	187	2,050
2001	272	949	2,150	184	649	1,990	41.8	262	3,190
2002	284	817	1,760	98.3	517	1,440	44.5	237	1,390
2003	160	580	1,420		317			109.2	
2004	213	867	2,570		525			232.7	
2005	373	1,100	2,580		639			190.5	
2006	312	1,230	3,720	136	740	2,440	47.3	232	1,980
2007	193	757	1,820		469			215	
2008	265	825	2,070		527			258	
2009	180	649	1,740		400			172	
2010	541	1,420	2,830		1,083			272	
2011	151	736	2,490	79.5	454	1,710		142	
2012	120	443	1,310	86	207	820		135	
2013	135	742	2,450		523			176	
2014	222	497	918	91.2	298	760	45.7	111.7	415
2015	137	532	1,350	63.5	317	1,130	27.5	141	1,610
2016	210	708	1,880	87	439	1,500	32.6	160.8	1,160
2017	187	624	1,630		416			190.8	
2018	200	698	2,060	121	414	1,096		156.7	
2019	168	581	1,860	90.6	370	853		165.1	
2020	200	582	1,890	120	405	744		174	
2021	200	777	1,890		512			187.8	
2022	125	597	1,610	65.6	403.5	1,263		192	
2023	190	906	2,020					216.8	
2024									

=== Szeged ===
Water discharge of the Tisza River at the Szeged gauging station. Complete series from starting 1921.

Average, minimum and maximum discharge (m^{3}/s)
Year	Min	Mean	Max	Year	Min	Mean	Max
2025				1972	268	593	2,000
2024				1971	224	697	1,660
2023	190	906	2,020	1970	406	1,559	3,820
2022	125	597	1,610	1969	240	800	2,080
2021	200	777	1,890	1968	127	799	1,980
2020	200	582	1,890	1967	212	988	2,900
2019	168	598	1,860	1966	397	1,160	2,940
2018	200	669	2,060	1965	228	1,060	2,690
2017	187	611	1,630	1964	155	673	2,770
2016	174	731	1,890	1963	138	585	1,930
2015	128	527	1,340	1962	138	735	3,100
2014	189	503	1,010	1961	110	381	1,280
2013	135	737	2,450	1960	276	804	1,900
2012	120	452	1,310	1959	172	502	1,410
2011	151	759	2,490	1958	205	932	2,600
2010	541	1,422	2,830	1957	167	748	2,000
2009	180	666	1,740	1956	166	794	2,410
2008	265	859	2,070	1955	321	1,140	2,220
2007	193	722	1,820	1954	133	508	1,520
2006	296	1,230	3,790	1953	132	763	2,510
2005	373	1,099	2,580	1952	133	791	2,040
2004	213	825	2,570	1951	181	674	1,480
2003	160	604	1,420	1950	112	536	1,160
2002	217	806	1,980	1949	171	540	1,010
2001	275	921	2,340	1948	186	823	1,920
2000	145	931	3,570	1947	132	579	1,810
1999	301	1,161	2,970	1946	109	574	1,450
1998	355	1,255	2,670	1945	282	806	1,630
1997	306	884	1,952	1944	249	1,058	1,960
1996	188	769	2,174	1943	147	391	675
1995	150	919	2,660	1942	216	961	2,380
1994	174	770	2,180	1941	818	1,784	3,260
1993	82.1	598	2,220	1940	312	1,305	3,060
1992	87.3	650	1,890	1939	170	721	1,340
1991	189	650	2,280	1938	302	825	1,780
1990	73.3	520	1,180	1937	302	864	2,060
1989	228	812	2,310	1936	355	707	1,120
1988	222	816	2,470	1935	169	605	1,560
1987	125	689	2,390	1934	278	543	1,400
1986	101	713	2,070	1933	210	919	1,840
1985	241	990	2,310	1932	211	992	3,490
1984	163	607	2,030	1931	288	845	1,690
1983	146	618	1,880	1930	191	672	1,170
1982	123	540	1,640	1929	230	604	1,290
1981	334	1,106	3,180	1928	163	630	1,640
1980	353	1,318	2,910	1927	359	736	1,210
1979	285	1,150	3,130	1926	478	1,154	2,220
1978	277	1,130	2,430	1925	142	749	1,350
1977	209	1,046	2,640	1924	160	914	3,090
1976	200	819	2,200	1923	144	834	1,720
1975	350	981	2,340	1922	230	1,070	2,790
1974	251	1,166	2,790	1921	118	436	776
1973	174	542	1,520				

=== Szolnok ===
Water discharge of the Tisza River at the Szolnok gauging station. Period 1953–2022.

Average, minimum and maximum discharge (m^{3}/s)
Year	Min	Mean	Max	Year	Min	Mean	Max
2025				1988	85.1	490	1,550
2024				1987	80.6	387	1,660
2023				1986	65.5	485	1,390
2022	65.6	403.5	1,263	1985	127	653	1,500
2021		512		1984	68.3	382	1,320
2020	120	405	744	1983	82.7	430	1,510
2019	90.6	370	853	1982	123	540	1,640
2018	121	414	1,096	1981	154	626	2,130
2017		416		1980	170	877	2,030
2016	87	439	1,500	1979	129	797	2,660
2015	63.5	317	1,130	1978	121	709	1,650
2014	91.2	298	760	1977	150	727	2,490
2013		523		1976	89.8	521	1,850
2012	86	207	820	1975	124	565	1,760
2011	79.5	454	1,710	1974	125	742	2,000
2010		1,083		1973	61	293	944
2009		400		1972	123	347	1,220
2008		527		1971	102	465	1,310
2007		469		1970	219	907	2,440
2006	136	740	2,440	1969	108	480	1,460
2005		639		1968	54.5	515	1,500
2004		525		1967	89	666	3,030
2003		317		1966	224	769	2,750
2002	98.3	517	1,440	1965	128	694	2,190
2001	184	649	1,990	1964	77.5	456	2,730
2000	93	563	2,600	1963	60	388	1,560
1999	136	704	2,360	1962	74.5	499	2,560
1998	215	808	2,060	1961	59	243	878
1997		509		1960	173	527	1,290
1996		440		1959	105	346	1,070
1995	101	557	1,450	1958	150	628	1,650
1994	66.9	462	1,500	1957	112	519	1,630
1993	61.6	363	1,510	1956	109	548	1,800
1992	58.7	424	1,460	1955	171	788	1,640
1991	118	368	1,550	1954	99	316	1,300
1990	69.8	336	858	1953	94.8	534	2,600
1989	80.6	387	1,660				

== Tributaries ==
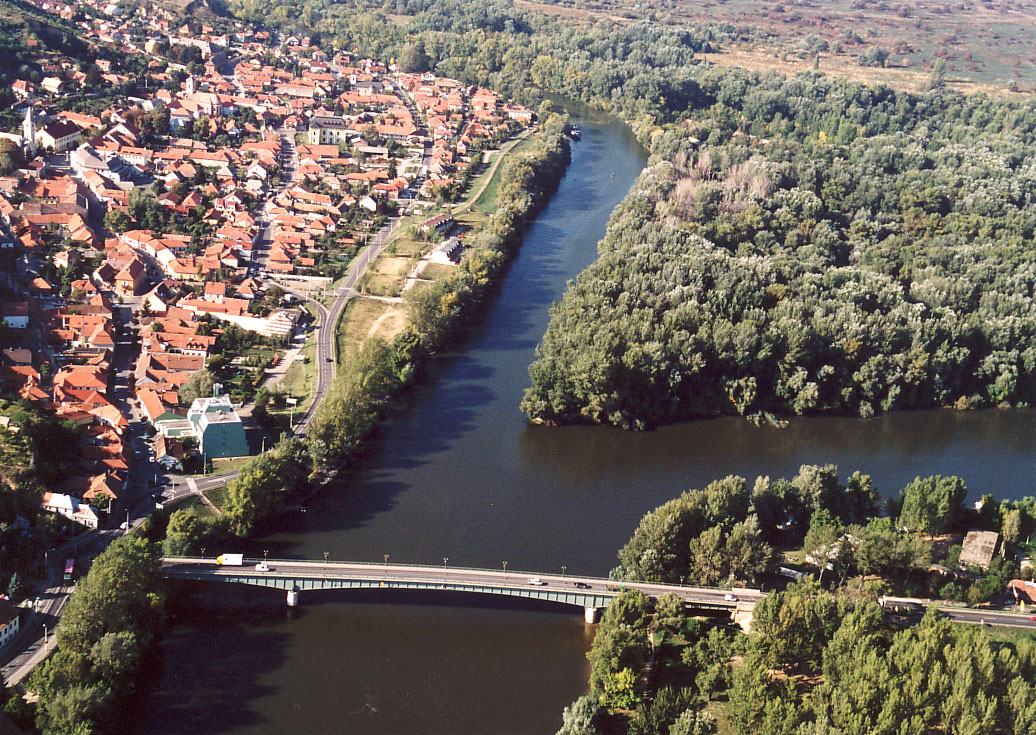
The rivers of Tisza and Bodrog at Tokaj, from above

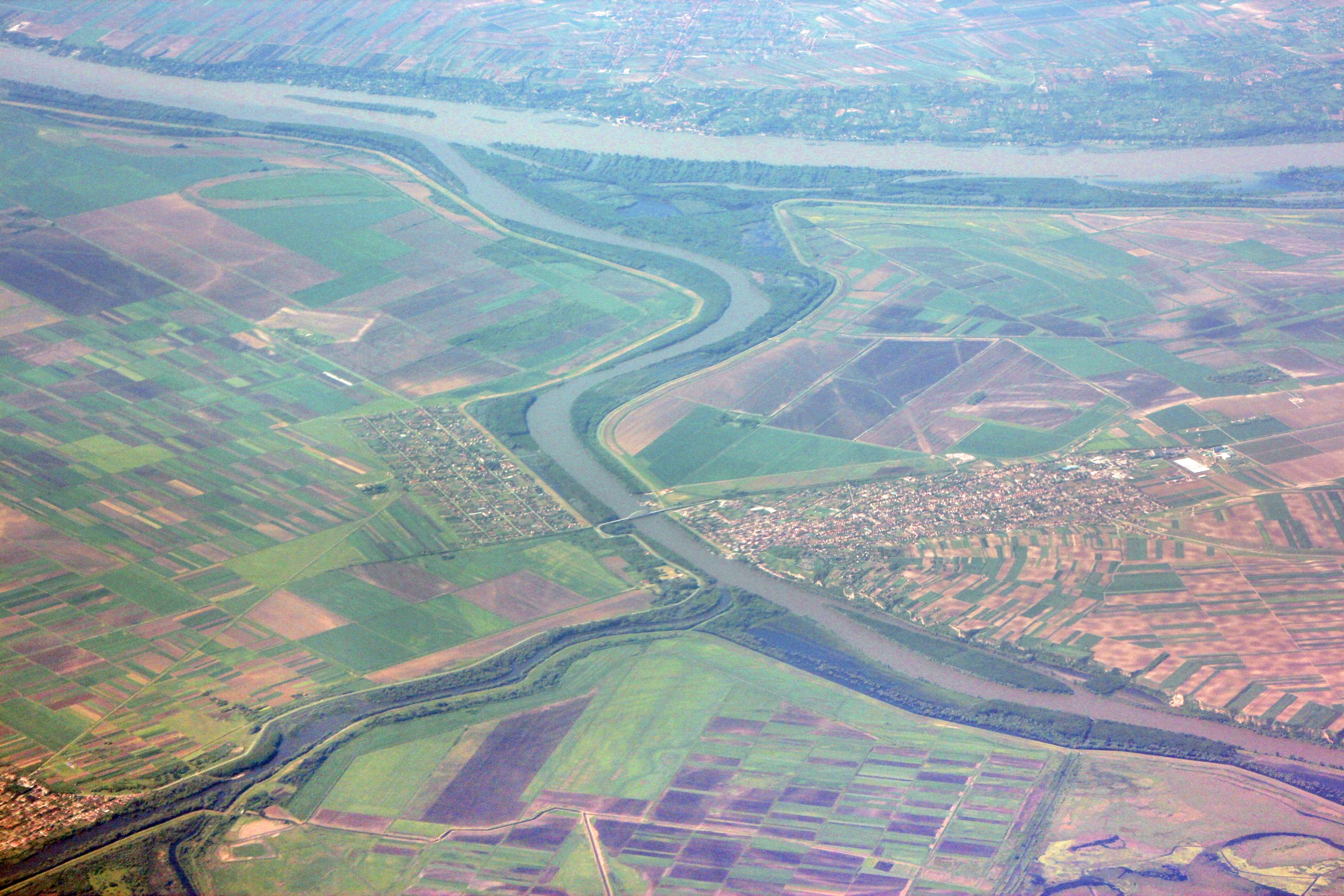
The Tisza joins the Danube.

The following rivers are tributaries to the river Tisza:

- Vișeu (entering at Valea Vișeului)
- Kosivska (entering at Luh)
- Shopurka (entering at Velykyi Bychkiv)
- Iza (entering at Sighetu Marmației)
- Sarasău
- Bic
- Săpânța
- Șaroș
- Teresva (entering near Teresva)
- Baia
- Valea lui Francisc
- Tereblia (entering at Bushtyno)
- Rika (entering near Khust)
- Batar
- Borzhava
- Tur
- Szamos (entering near Vásárosnamény)
  - Someșul Mare (in Dej)
    - Șieu (in Beclean)
      - Bistrița (near Bistrița)
  - Someșul Mic (in Dej)
    - Someșul Cald (in Gilău)
    - Someșul Rece (in Gilău)
- Kraszna (entering in Vásárosnamény)
- Bodrog (entering in Tokaj)
  - Ondava (near Cejkov)
  - Latorica (near Cejkov)
    - Laborec (near Oborín)
      - Uzh (near Pavlovce nad Uhom)
      - Cirocha (in Humenné)
    - Stara
    - Vicha
    - Kerepets
- Sajó (entering near Tiszaújváros)
  - Hornád (near Kesznyéten)
- Eger (entering in Poroszló)
- Zagyva (entering in Szolnok)
- Körös (entering near Csongrád)
  - Sebes-Körös (near Gyoma)
    - Berettyó (Barcău) (in Szeghalom)
  - White-Körös (near Gyula)
  - Black-Körös (near Gyula)
- Maros (entering near Szeged)
  - Arieș (near Gura Arieșului)
  - Târnava (near Teiuș)
    - Târnava Mare (in Blaj)
    - Târnava Mică (in Blaj)
- Aranca (entering near Padej)
- Čik (entering near Bačko Petrovo Selo)
- Jegrička (entering near Žabalj)
- Bega (entering near Titel)

The main tributaries of the Tisza:

Left tributary	Right tributary	Length (km)	Basin size (km^{2})	Average discharge (m^{3}/s)^{*}
Lower Tisza
Bega		254.8	6,249.6	19.01
	Jegrička	65.4	616	1.62
	Čik (Csík)	95	629.7	1.39
	Budzak		146.2	0.31
Zlatica (Aranca)		117	1,430.2	2.03
	Kiriš (Keres-patak)		862.3	1.84
	Köröséri főcsatorna	77.3	804.8	0.29
	Gyálaréti Holt-Tisza	18.6	481.8	0.93
	Szegedi csatorna	17.8	79	0.12
Maros		754.1	30,331.8	190.3
Middle Tisza
Kósdi-csatorna		37	416.4	
	Algyői főcsatorna	42.6	1,370.8	2.79
Percsorai főcsatorna		16.2	92.1	0.1
Kurca		36.9	1,266.3	2.7
	Dong-ér	84.4	1,672.2	2.97
	Vidre-ér	22	246.7	0.28
Körös		363.4	27,537.4	115.86
	Alpár–Nyárlőrinci csatorna	41	271.3	0.2
	Peitsik-ér	9.5	199	0.15
	Körös-ér	56.4	564.5	1.07
	Gerje–Perje főcsatorna	60.5	903.9	2.17
	Zagyva	179.4	5,676.6	16.85
Görbe-ér			358.5	1.11
	Millér-ér	60.4	505.9	1.84
	Dobai főcsatorna	18.2	139.7	0.21
	Saj-foki főcsatorna			1.1
	Hanyi-ér	22	331.5	0.97
	Laskó	69.2	367.5	1.11
Tiszafüredi főcsatorna				0.12
	Eger (Rima)	87.4	1,378.6	3.24
	Tiszavalki főcsatorna	20.4	299	0.53
	Sulymos főcsatorna	17.3	105.4	0.39
	Rigós	39.3	148.3	0.48
	Hejő	44	293.3	0.66
	Sajó	229.4	12,708.3	78.62
	Bodrog	266.9	13,578.9	119.62
Upper Tisza
Lónyai főcsatorna		91.4	1,957.8	4.4
	Tiszakarádi főcsatorna	38.9	324.8	0.5
	Belfő csatorna	53	636	1.58
	Szipa csatorna	37.6	225.2	0.49
Kraszna		193.4	3,142.3	8.22
Szamos		415.1	15,881.4	135.37
Túr főcsatorna		65.2	614.9	
Túr		94.6	1,261.8	14.03
	Borzhava (Borsa)	103.5	1,417.9	18.78
Batar (Batár-patak)		53.8	395.6	3.87
	Rika (Nagyág)	92.8	1,161.4	20.19
	Khustets (Husztica)			1.52
	Bailova		134.8	2.04
	Tereblia (Talabor)	91	769.5	13.47
	Martos	13	23.6	0.27
	Tyachivets (Técső-patak)	29	86.5	1.46
	Teresva (Tarac)	84.8	1,224	22.74
Săpănța			127.4	1.54
	Apsica (Apsa-patak)	39	257	4.17
Isa (Iza)		77.6	1,293.5	18.74
	Shopurka (Gyertyá-nos)	41.4	286	5.31
	Kosivska (Kaszó)	41	157.3	2.96
Vișeu (Visó)		77.5	1,581.8	39.08
Bilij (Fejér-patak)		12	45.5	0.87
	Silskij			0.72
Moskva		1.5		0.22
White Tisza		33.6	484.7	10.17
	Black Tisza	50.3	566.2	11.48

^{*}Period: 1971–2000

== Cities and towns ==
The Tisza (Tisa) flows through the following countries and cities (ordered from the source to mouth):

- Ukraine
  - Rakhiv
  - Tiachiv
  - Khust
  - Vynohradiv
- Slovakia
  - Malé Trakany
  - Veľké Trakany
  - Biel
- Romania
  - Sighetu Marmației
- Hungary
  - Vásárosnamény
  - Záhony
  - Tokaj
  - Tiszalök
  - Tiszaújváros
  - Tiszafüred
  - Szolnok
  - Tiszakécske
  - Csongrád
  - Szentes
  - Szeged
- Serbia
  - Kanjiža
  - Novi Kneževac
  - Senta
  - Ada
  - Mol
  - Bačko Petrovo Selo
  - Bečej
  - Novi Bečej
  - Titel

== Cultural legacy ==
Among Hungary's rivers, the Tisza holds a special place in the hearts of the Hungarian people. This is reflected in the countless Hungarian folk songs and poems that celebrate it, making it the most frequently praised river in Hungarian culture. The Tisza is portrayed as a temperamental yet deeply cherished force of nature. Often described as "blonde", "wild", "muddy", "winding". Until the Treaty of Trianon in 1920, the Tisza was commonly described as "the most Hungarian river", because unlike the Danube, which passes through several countries, the Tisza flowed entirely within the borders of historical Hungary. Even today the Tisza fundamentally influences the surface-water conditions of more than half of Hungary.

== See also ==
- Tice (wetlands)
- Ečka fish pond
