= Teresva (river) =

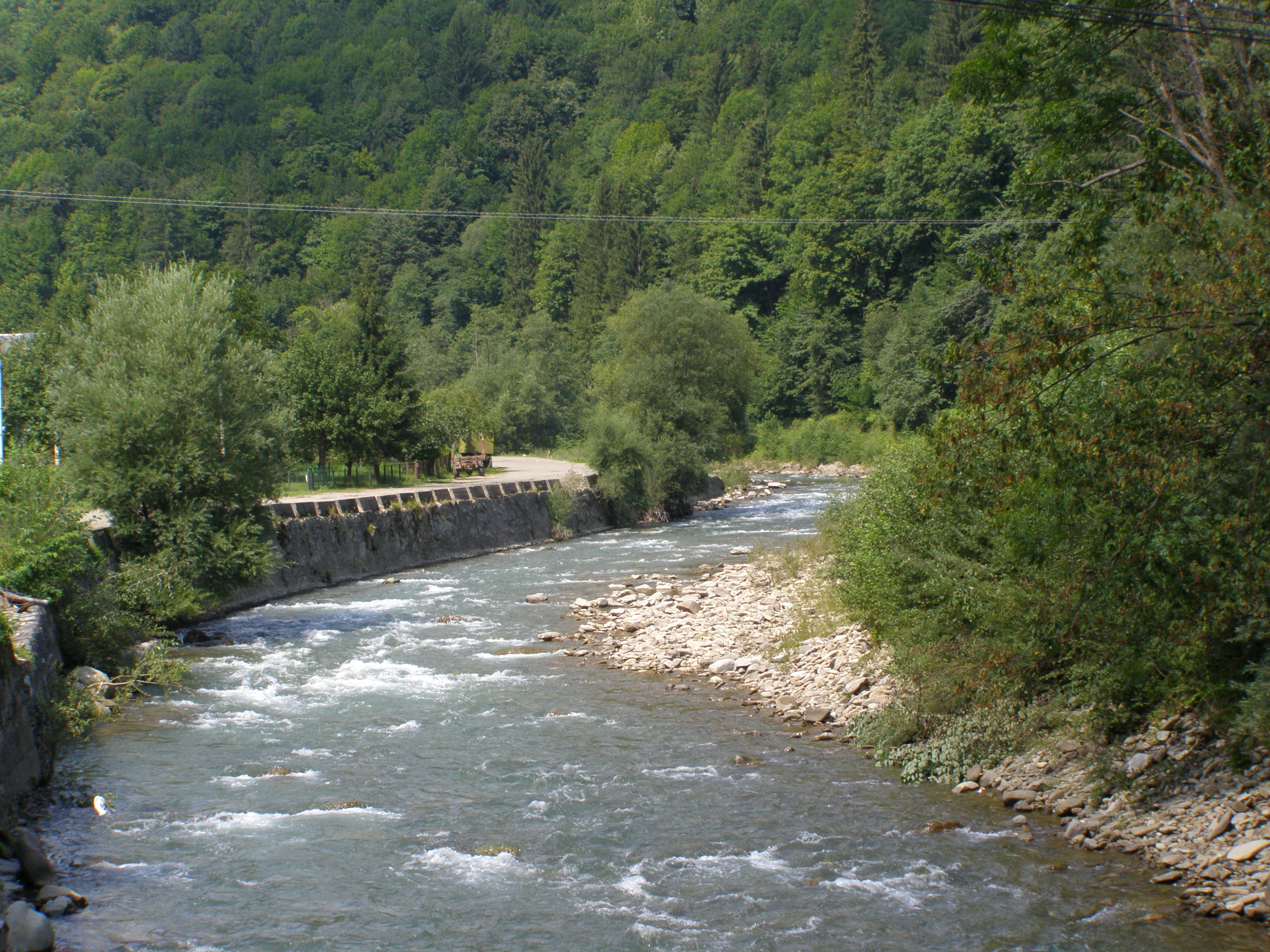

Location
- Country: Ukraine

Physical characteristics
- Source
  - location: Eastern Carpathians
- Mouth
  - location: Tisza at Teresva
  - coordinates: 47.9887°N 23.6576°E
- Basin size: 1,220 km^{2} (470 sq mi)

Basin features
- Progression: Tisza→ Danube→ Black Sea

The Teresva (Ukrainian: Тересва) is a right tributary of the river Tisza in the Zakarpattia Oblast, western Ukraine. Its drainage basin covers an area of 1,220 km^{2} (470 sq mi). It rises in the Eastern Carpathians. It flows through the towns Ust-Chorna and Dubove, and it discharges into the Tisza near the town Teresva, on the border with Romania.
