= Malé Trakany =

Municipality of Slovakia

Malé Trakany Kistárkány
- Municipality
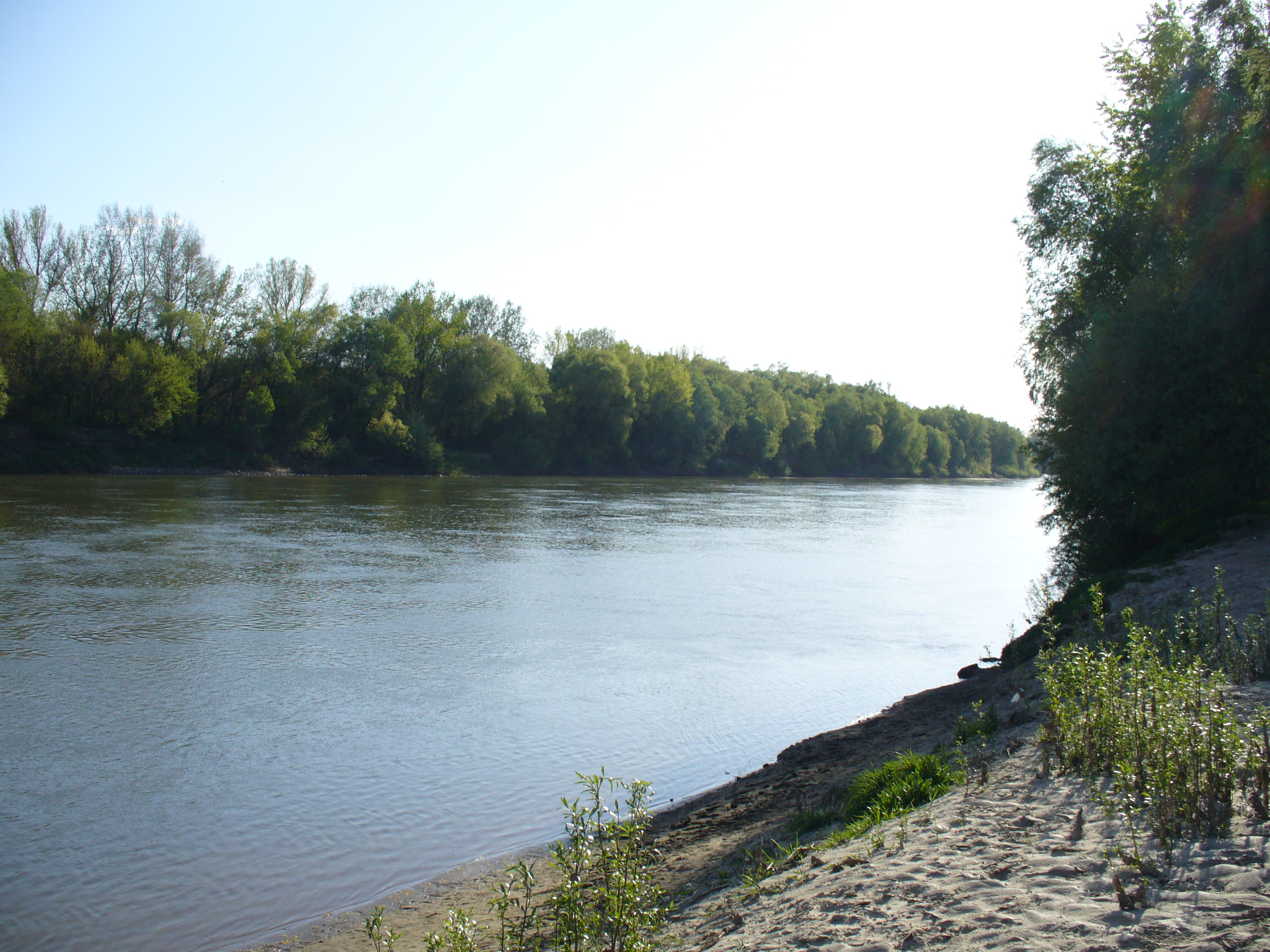
- Tisza River in the village

- Flag

- Location of Malé Trakany in the Košice Region Location of Malé Trakany in Slovakia
- Coordinates: 48.40°N 22.12°E
- Country: Slovakia
- Region: Košice Region
- District: Trebišov District
- First mentioned: 1332

Area
  - Total: 11.08 km^{2} (4.28 sq mi)
- Elevation: 105 m (344 ft)

Population (2025)
  - Total: 1,084
- Time zone: UTC+1 (CET)
  - Summer (DST): UTC+2 (CEST)
- Postal code: 764 2
- Area code: +421 56
- Vehicle registration plate (until 2022): TV
- Website: www.maletrakany.sk

Malé Trakany (Hungarian: Kistárkány) is a village and municipality in the Trebišov District in the Košice Region of south-eastern Slovakia.

== History ==
In historical records the village was first mentioned in 1332.

== Geography ==
The municipality lies at an altitude of 105 metres (344 ft) and covers an area of 11.08 km^{2} (4.28 sq mi) (2025). It is next to the Hungarian border (at Tiszabezdéd, Győröcske and Záhony) and near the Ukrainian border (at Solomonovo).

== Population ==
Population statistic (10 years)
Year	1995	2005	2015	2025
Count	901	1159	1101	1084
Difference		+28.63%	−5.00%	−1.54%

Population statistic
Year	2024	2025
Count	1087	1084
Difference		−0.27%

It has a population of 1084 people (31 December 2025).

=== Ethnicity ===
Census 2021 (1+ %)
Ethnicity	Number	Fraction
Hungarian	930	82.74%
Slovak	176	15.65%
Not found out	83	7.38%
Total	1124	

In year 2021 was 1124 people by ethnicity 930 as Hungarian, 176 as Slovak, 83 as Not found out, 5 as Romani, 2 as Czech, 2 as Ukrainian, 2 as Rusyn and 1 as German.

Note on population: The difference values of population numbers in the table "Population statistic" and in the sections "Ethnicity" & "Religion" is caused by the use of various statistical methods.

=== Religion ===
Census 2021 (1+ %)
Religion	Number	Fraction
Roman Catholic Church	491	43.68%
Calvinist Church	360	32.03%
Greek Catholic Church	100	8.9%
None	90	8.01%
Not found out	66	5.87%
Total	1124	

In year 2021 was 1124 people by religion 491 from Roman Catholic Church, 360 from Calvinist Church, 100 from Greek Catholic Church, 90 from None, 66 from Not found out, 9 from Evangelical Church, 3 from Christian Congregations in Slovakia, 2 from Apostolic Church, 1 from Jehovah's Witnesses, 1 from Islam and 1 from Ad hoc movements.

== Facilities ==
The village has a public library and a football pitch.
