= Čik =

Coordinates: 45°42′N 20°03′E

Čik (Чик)
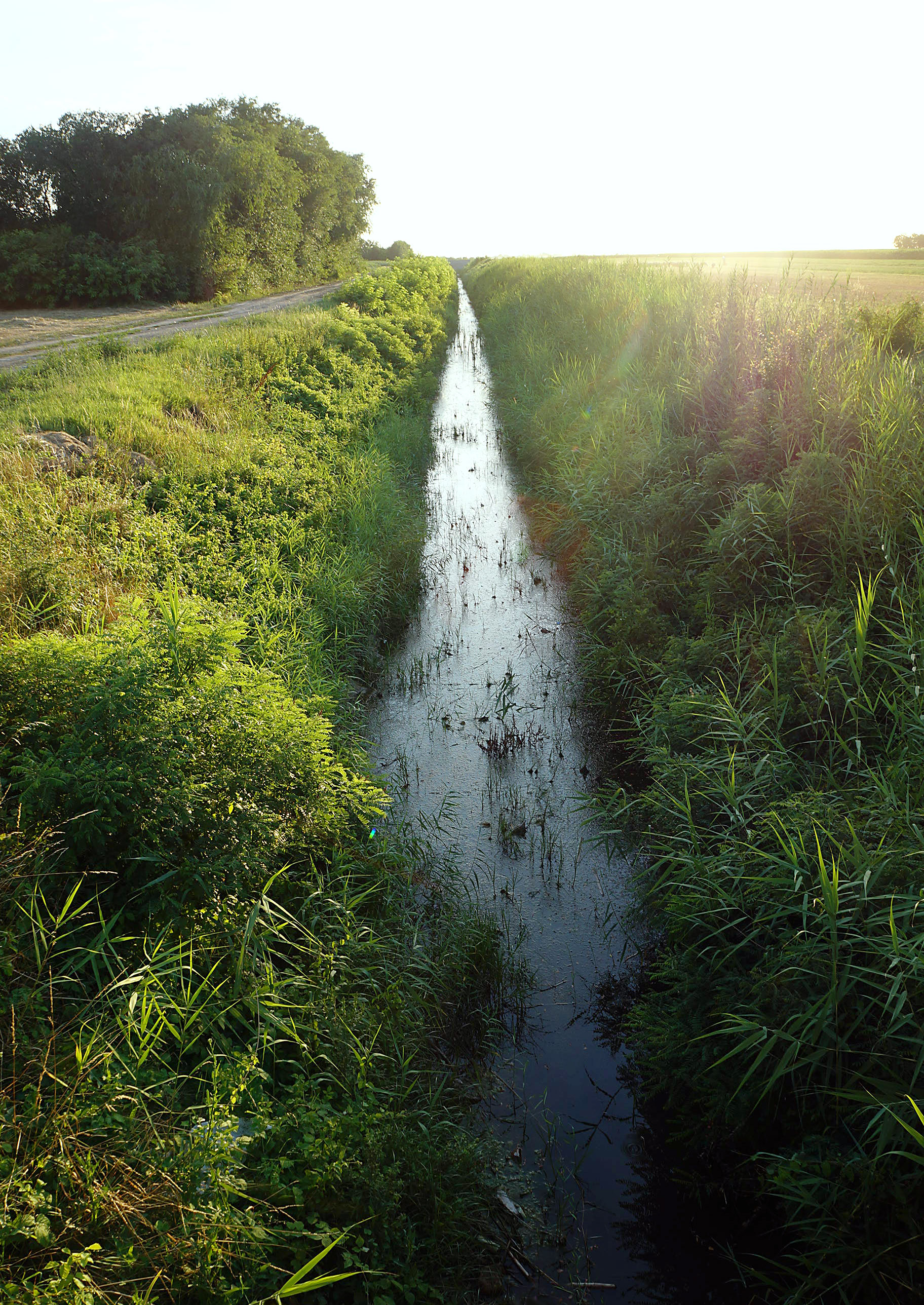

Location
- Country: Serbia

Physical characteristics
- Source
  - location: Subotička Peščara, Vojvodina, Serbia
  - elevation: 128 m (420 ft)
- Mouth
  - location: Tisa river at Bačko Petrovo Selo, Vojvodina, Serbia
- Length: 95 km (59 mi)
- Basin size: 481 km^{2} (186 sq mi)

Basin features
- Progression: Tisza→ Danube→ Black Sea

The Čik or Čiker (Serbian Cyrillic: Чик or Чикер; Hungarian: Csík-ér, Croatian: Čik or Čiker) is a river in northern Serbia. A 95 km (59 mi) long right tributary to the Tisa river, it flows entirely within the Bačka region of Vojvodina province.

== Course ==
The Čik springs out in the northwestern part of the Subotička Peščara, between the village of Donji Tavankut and the city of Subotica, near the Hungarian border, at an altitude of 128 m (420 ft). It starts as an unimportant slow stream of water near the Tavankut hamlets of Čikerija and Kobino Selo. From its source to the mouth, the river flows in the southeast direction, next to the hamlets of Verušić and Naumovićevo.

As the river grows, next to the villages of Višnjevac, Čantavir and Bačko Dušanovo, dams were constructed to regulate the flow, in both upper and lower course. In the lower course there are thick growths of reed on the banks of the river, which is at this point 2–4 m deep. After the villages of Tornjoš, Svetićevo and Obornjača, the river empties into the Tisa at the village of Bačko Petrovo Selo, at an altitude of 74 m (243 ft).

== Characteristics ==
The Čik has been neglected by environmental institutions for some time, but in the 1990s the lower part of the course was cleaned and the once almost-dead river was re-populated with many species of fish (carp, pike, bream, pike-perch, tench), becoming a major fishing resort.

The Čik belongs to the Black Sea drainage basin and it is neither channeled nor navigable. Itself, it drains an area of 481 km^{2} (186 sq mi). The name of the river comes from the Hungarian word csikó, meaning foal.

After World War I, a new border was drawn between Hungary and the newly formed Kingdom of the Serbs, Croats, and Slovenes (future Yugoslavia), as stipulated by the 1920 Treaty of Trianon. The border left significant number of divided ethnic population on both sides, so both states encouraged the relocation. Those who decided to move were called "optants". Serbian optants changed their land in Hungary for the land of the Hungarian optants in Yugoslavia. A group of optants settled along the Čik river close to the border and formed a new settlement called Čikerija. It mirrored the Csikéria village on the Hungarian side. Čikerija originally consisted of 28 salaši, individual family farms, founded by the optants from the Hungarian village of Deszk, near Szeged, which still has a Serbian minority. By 2018, only one salaš was still operational. The hamlet belonged to the village of Tavankut, until Tavankut was divided in three separate settlements in 1978 when Čikerija became part of the newly carved village of Ljutovo.
