= Tiszabezdéd =

Coordinates: 48°22′N 22°09′E

- Coat of arms
- Interactive map of Tiszabezdéd
- Country: Hungary
- County: Szabolcs-Szatmár-Bereg

Area
  - Total: 18.60 km^{2} (7.18 sq mi)

Population (2015)
  - Total: 1,889
  - Density: 101/km^{2} (260/sq mi)
- Time zone: UTC+1 (CET)
  - Summer (DST): UTC+2 (CEST)
- Postal code: 4624
- Area code: 45
- Website: http://www.tiszabezded.hu

Location of Szabolcs-Szatmar-Bereg county in Hungary

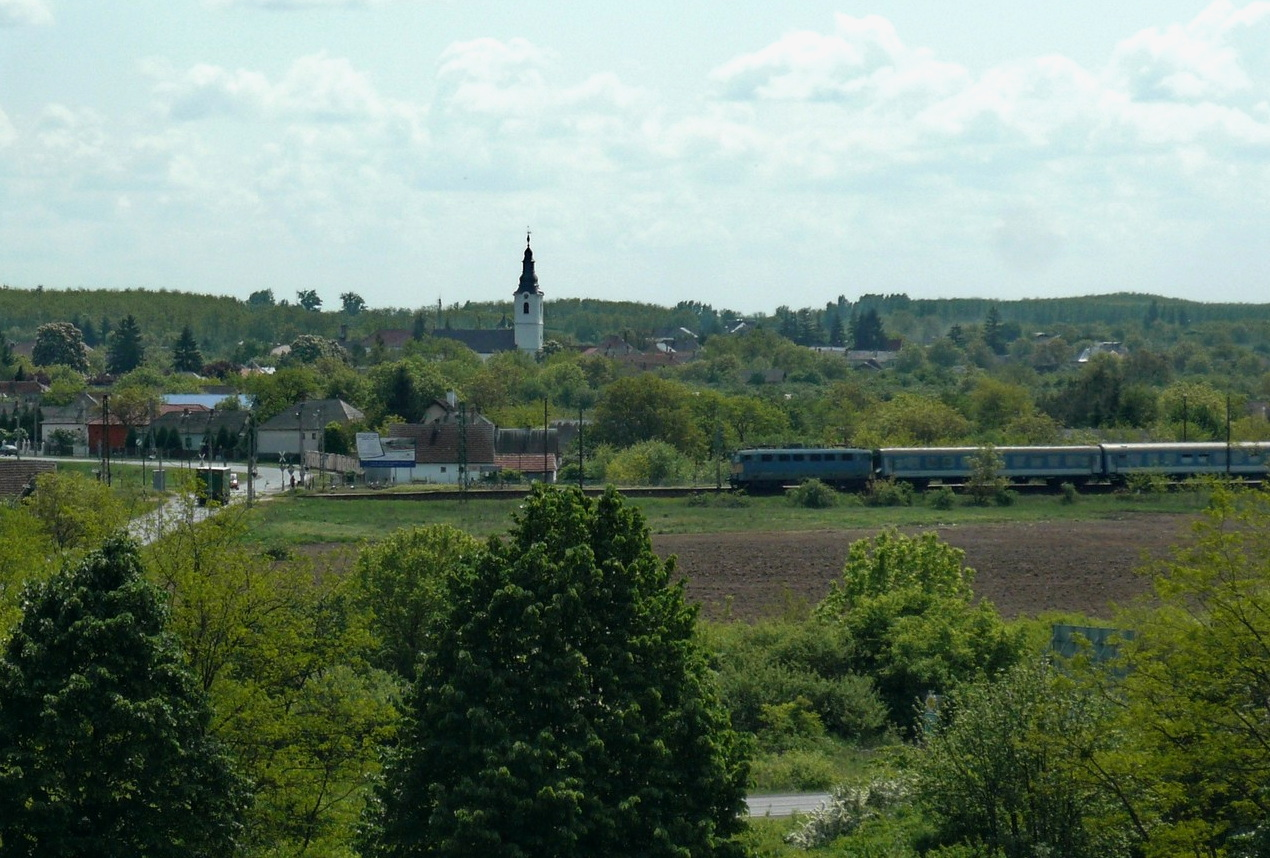
Tiszabezded, Hungary

Tiszabezdéd is a village in Szabolcs-Szatmár-Bereg county, in the Northern Great Plain region of eastern Hungary.

== Geography ==
It covers an area of 18.60 km^{2} (7 sq mi) and has a population of 1,889 people (2015). It is next to the Slovak border (at Veľké Trakany and Malé Trakany) and near the Ukrainian border.

== History ==
His name is personal, of Slavic origin. It may have existed as early as the 13th century (H VIII. 14.), as a settlement adjacent to Zsurk.

At the beginning of the 14th century, it was the property of the Tomaj clan; the serfs of Dénes in Szentmártoni of this genus destroyed the neighboring Tuzsér and Kálonga estates of the Várdai family. This quarrel lasted for several years in the 14th century and resumed in the 18th century.

During the lawsuit, a border section called Földvár was mentioned on the border of Bezdéd in 1406, and the family was already called Bezdéd at that time.

In 1422 it was still owned by the Bezdédi family.

In 1423, on the other hand, the Móré family from Dada was the landlord.

During the 16th century, the Losonczians recovered it and were constantly sued for it by the Csapi, Báthori, Homonna and Várdai families.

In 1588, however, only Kristóf Csapi and Péter are said to be landlords; Significant place with 50 serf households.

In 1596 it may have had a population of about 130-140.

In 1629 it was destroyed by the soldiers of Péter Melith, a landlord from Kisvárda and the captain of the castle in Satu Mare. However, in 1618 Péter Melith was already partly - but there were seven other landlords besides him - and István Kendi had a significant part with 24 serfs.

The Melith family lasted until 1703, when the family became extinct and went to the treasury.

In the 18th century there were ten landlords from the following families for royal donation and purchase: br. Ghillányi br. Dőry, Sághy, Jósa, Péczely, Ormos, Lónyay, Somlyódy, Uszkay.

After the emancipation of serfs, it was held by the descendants of roughly the same families, and in 1839 had a population of 1,257.
