= Teresva =

Rural locality in Zakarpattia Oblast, Ukraine

Teresva Тересва Theresiental • Taracköz
- Rural settlement
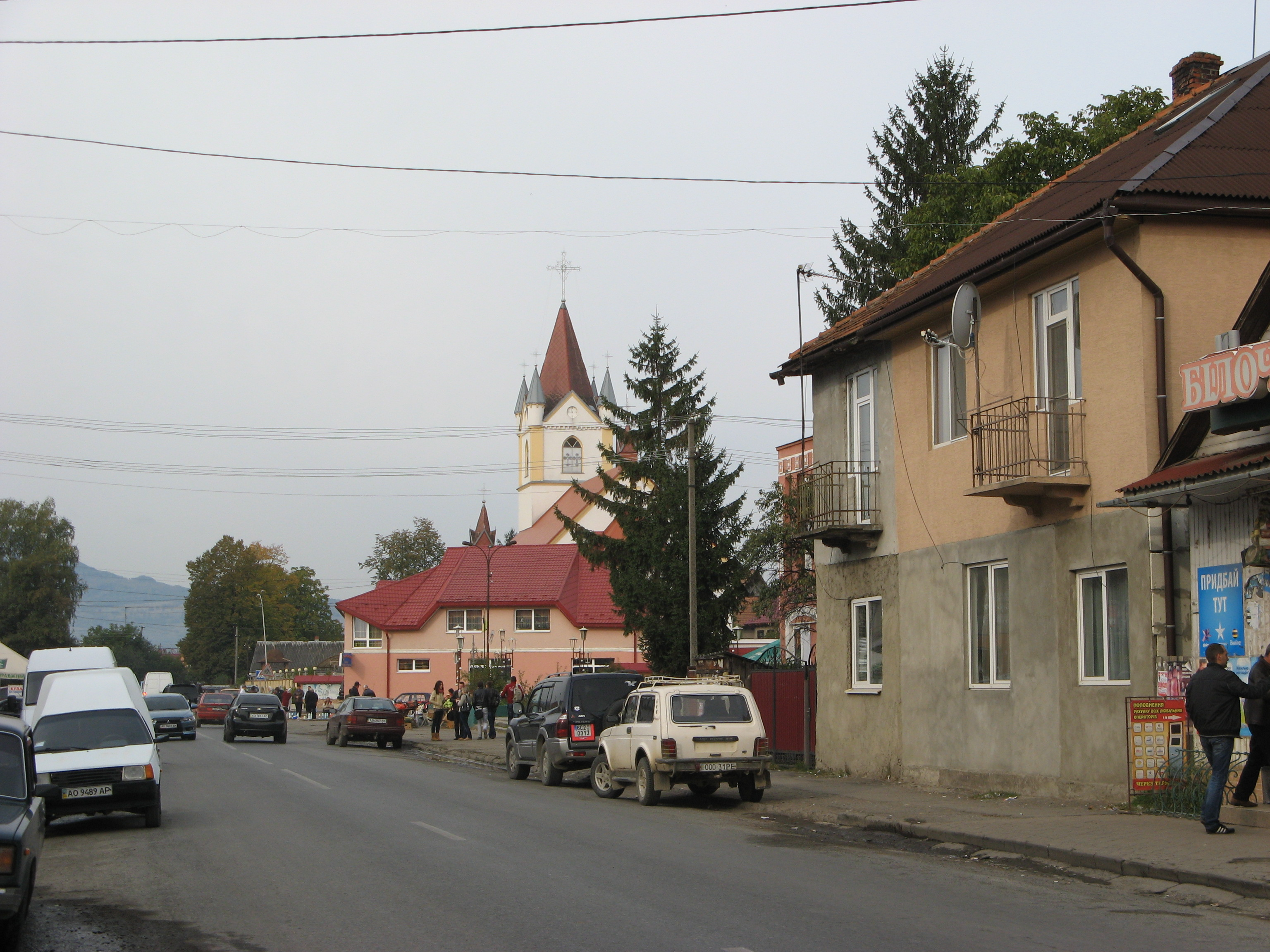
- Street in downtown

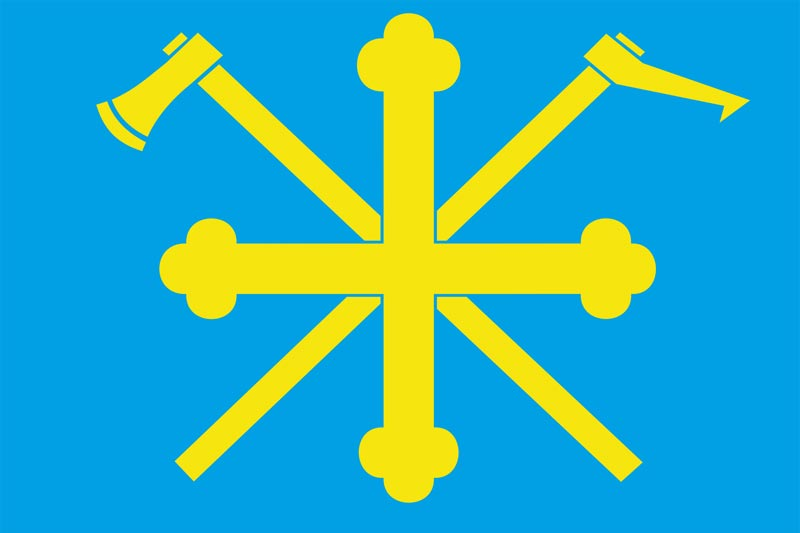
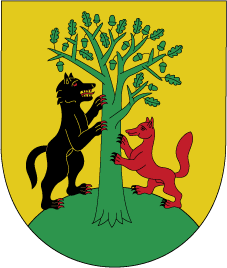
- Flag Coat of arms

- Location of Teresva in Zakarpattia Oblast Location of Teresva in Ukraine
- Coordinates: 48°00′04″N 23°41′30″E
- Country: Ukraine
- Oblast: Zakarpattia Oblast
- Raion: Tiachiv Raion
- Established: 1450
- Town status: 1957

Government
  - Town Head: Vasyl Oleksiy
- Elevation: 235 m (771 ft)

Population (2022)
  - Total: ▼7,480
- Time zone: UTC+2 (EET)
  - Summer (DST): UTC+3 (EEST)
- Postal code: 90564
- Area code: +380 3134
- Website: http://rada.gov.ua/

Teresva (Ukrainian: Тересва, German: Theresiental, Romanian: Teresva, Hungarian: Taracköz, Slovak: Terešva) is a rural settlement in Tiachiv Raion (district) of Zakarpattia Oblast (region) in western Ukraine. It is situated at the confluence of the rivers Tisza and Teresva. The town's population was 7,554 at the 2001 Ukrainian Census. Current population is 7,480 (2022 estimate).

== History ==
Until 26 January 2024, Teresva was designated urban-type settlement. On this day, a new law entered into force which abolished this status, and Teresva became a rural settlement.

In 2023 the rail line between Teresva and Romania reopened.
