= Lake Tisza =

Artificial lake in Hungary

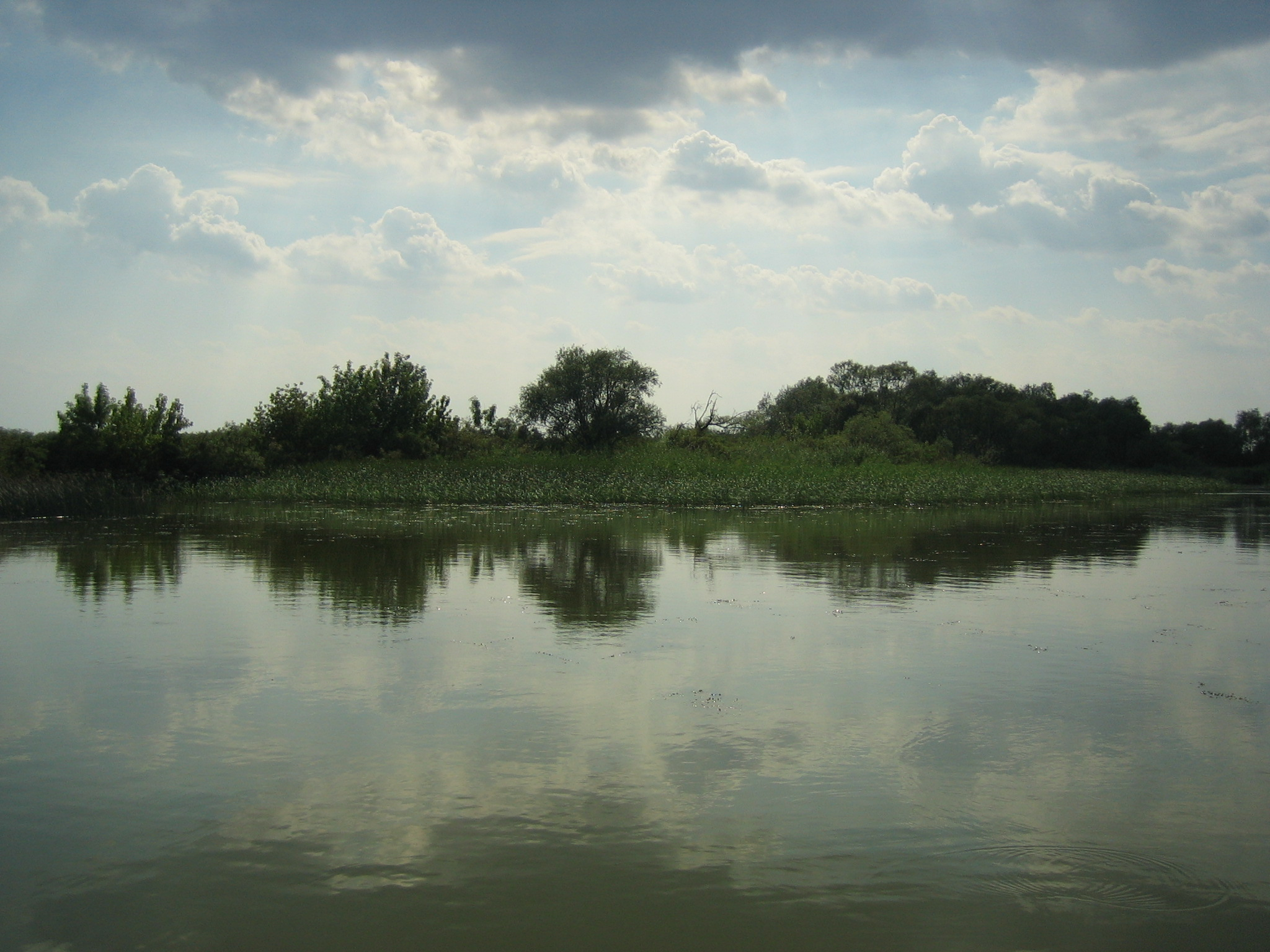

- Location within Hungary
- Coordinates: 47°36′N 20°40′E
- Lake type: reservoir
- Primary inflows: Tisza River, Eger Stream, Laskó Stream
- Primary outflows: Tisza River
- Basin countries: Hungary
- Max. length: 27 km (17 mi)
- Surface area: 127 km^{2} (49 sq mi)
- Average depth: 1.3 m (4 ft 3 in)
- Max. depth: 17 m (56 ft)

Lake Tisza (Hungarian: Tisza-tó), also known as Kisköre Reservoir (Hungarian: Kiskörei-víztározó), is the largest artificial lake in Hungary. It is located at the southeastern edge of Heves county, next to counties Borsod-Abaúj-Zemplén, Hajdú-Bihar and Jász-Nagykun-Szolnok.

As part of the ongoing Tisza River flood control project, the Tisza Dam was built in 1973. Its filling was finished in the 1990s, resulting in a 127 km^{2} lake. The lake is 27 km in length, with an average depth of 1.3 m and a maximum depth of 17 m; it contains 43 km^{2} of small islands.

Following the reservoir's completion, Hungarians began to flock to the site for holidays, since it compared favourably with the crowded and expensive Lake Balaton, the traditional holiday site. As a result, tourist infrastructure has been developed on the reservoir—renamed Lake Tisza—and the government has designated it an official tourism destination.

The lake (or reservoir) has a perfect ecology with a diversity of birds, plants, and animals. The Hortobágy National Park has been a UNESCO World Heritage Site since 1999.

Lake Tisza Ecocentre in Poroszló was erected to collect and display the nature and wildlife of the Tisza River valley and Lake Tisza. It was opened to the public on 27 April 2012.
