= Bushtyno =

Rural locality in Zakarpattia Oblast, Ukraine

Bushtyno Буштино Bustyaháza
- Rural settlement
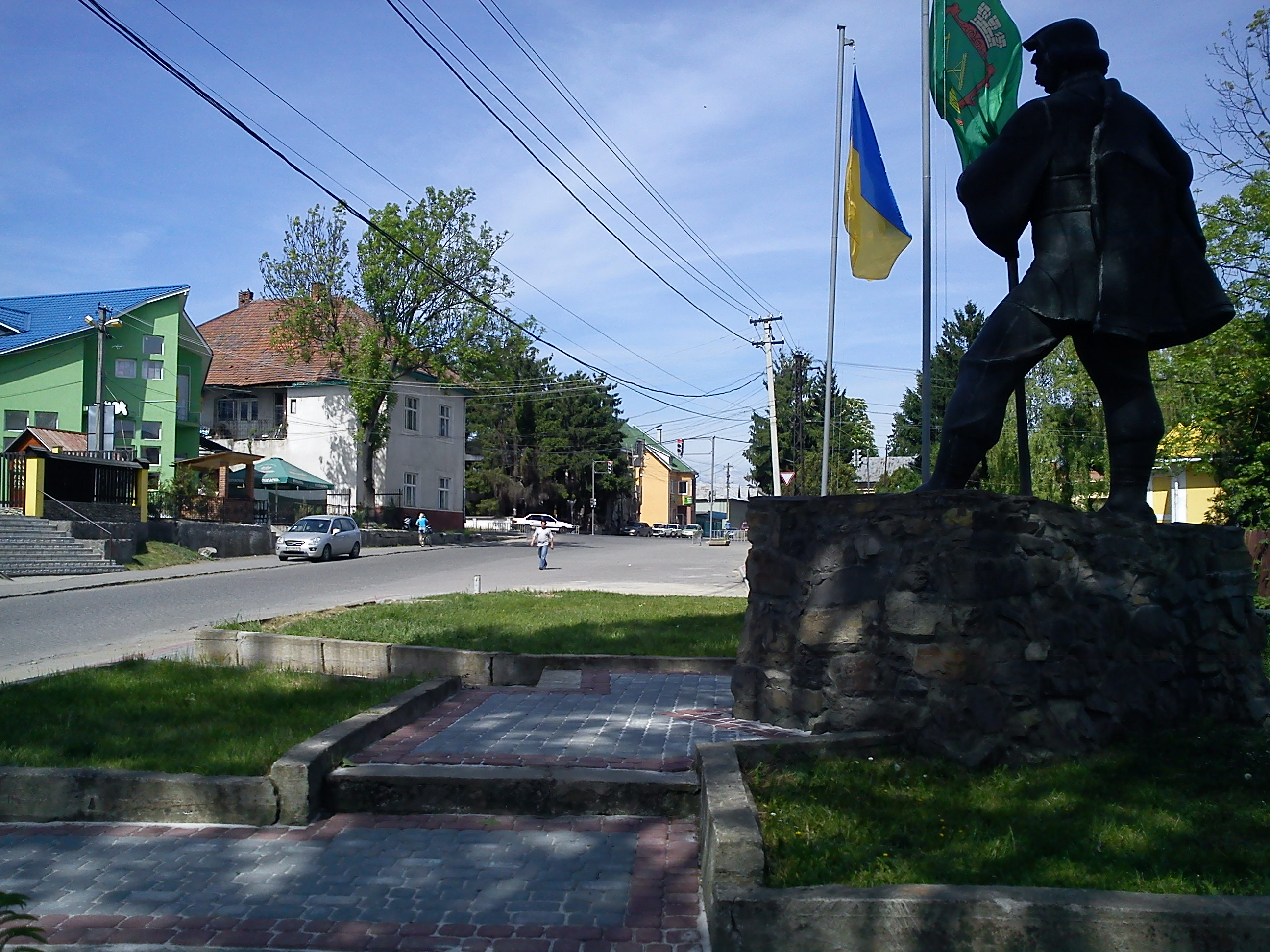
- Bushtyno center

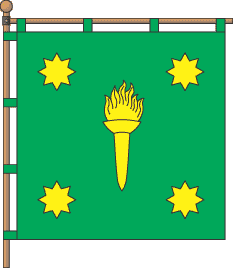
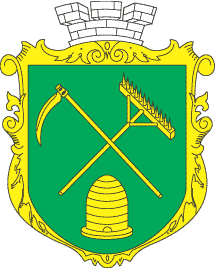
- Flag Coat of arms

- Location within Zakarpattia Oblast Location within Ukraine
- Coordinates: 48°03′13″N 23°28′36″E
- Country: Ukraine
- Oblast: Zakarpattia Oblast
- Raion: Tiachiv Raion
- First mentioned: 1373
- Town status: 1957

Government
  - Town Head: Ivan Sabadosh

Area
  - Total: 12 km^{2} (4.6 sq mi)
- Elevation: 207 m (679 ft)

Population (2022)
  - Total: 8,444 ▼
  - Density: 700/km^{2} (1,800/sq mi)
- Time zone: UTC+2 (EET)
  - Summer (DST): UTC+3 (EEST)
- Postal code: 90556
- Area code: +380 3134
- Website: http://rada.gov.ua/

Bushtyno (Ukrainian: Буштино [ˈbuʃtɪno]; Hungarian: Bustyaháza; Romanian: Bustea; Slovak: Buštín; Yiddish: בישטינא) is a rural settlement in Tiachiv Raion, Zakarpattia Oblast, western Ukraine. Bushtyno is located in a small valley where the Tereblia and the Tisza rivers meet. The town's population was 8,506 as of the 2001 Ukrainian census. Population: 8,444 (2022 estimate).

== History ==
The settlement was first mentioned in 1373 as the village of Bushta. In 1910, the settlement belonged to the Máramaros County of the Kingdom of Hungary. At the time the settlement was known as Bustyaháza, a Hungarian variant of the name, and contained a total of 2,056 inhabitants, the majority of which were Ruthenians.

In 1930, the settlement's Jewish population was 1,042. Known for its wood industry, during the period of existence of Carpatho-Ukraine Bushtyno housed the State Forestry Directorate.

In 1957, Bushtyna was granted the status of an urban-type settlement. In 1995, the settlement was renamed from Bushtyna (Ukrainian: Буштина) to the current "Bushtyno." On 26 January 2024, a new law entered into force which abolished the status of an urban-type settlement, and Bushtyno became a rural settlement.

Rabbi Mordechai Leifer of Nadvorna is buried there.

== Geography ==
The village is located in the eastern part of Zakarpattia Oblast, at the confluence of the Terebli River into the Tisza, next to the Gutin Mountains. The district center Tiachiv is located 8 kilometers from Bushtyno. The territory of the village has a flat relief.

The climate is temperate continental with warm summers and mild winters. Southwest winds prevail throughout the year.

The national highway Mukachevo - Rohatyn and the Chop - Solotvino railway pass through the settlement, connecting the village with other settlements in Ukraine and other countries. The village borders the villages of Yablunivka, Steblivka, Vonihove, Ruske Pole, Novobarovota and the village of Vyshkovo.

The village is inhabited by Ukrainians, Hungarians, Russians, Romanians, Roma, Slovaks, Germans, etc.

== Notable people ==
- Alina Pash (born 1993), Ukrainian singer and rapper
