= Tereblia (river) =

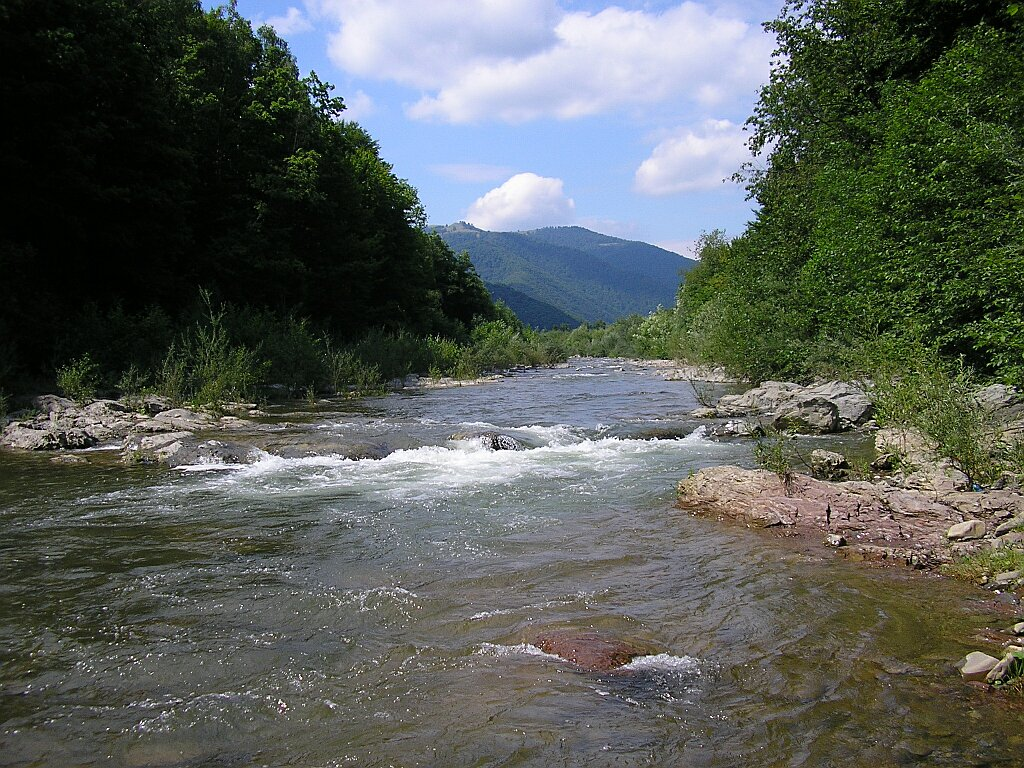

Location
- Country: Ukraine

Physical characteristics
- Source
  - location: Eastern Carpathians
- Mouth
  - location: Tisza in Bushtyno
  - coordinates: 48.0355°N 23.4751°E

Basin features
- Progression: Tisza→ Danube→ Black Sea

The Tereblia (Ukrainian: Теребля) is a right tributary of the river Tisza in the Zakarpattia Oblast, western Ukraine. It flows through the villages Synevyr, Kolochava, Drahovo and Tereblia, and discharges into the Tisza in Bushtyno.
