= Tereblia =

Tereblia Теребля
- Village
- Location within Zakarpattia Oblast Location within Ukraine
- Coordinates: 48°06′41″N 23°35′35″E
- Country: Ukraine
- Oblast: Zakarpattia Oblast
- Raion: Tiachiv Raion

Population (2001)
  - Total: 3,705

Tereblia (Ukrainian: Теребля) is a village in Zakarpattia Oblast (province) of western Ukraine. The village is located around 11 km north of Tiachiv, on the river Tereblia. Administratively, the village belongs to the Tiachiv Raion, Zakarpattia Oblast. As of 2023, its population was 3,685.
