= Eger (Tisza) =

Stream in Hungary

Eger Rima
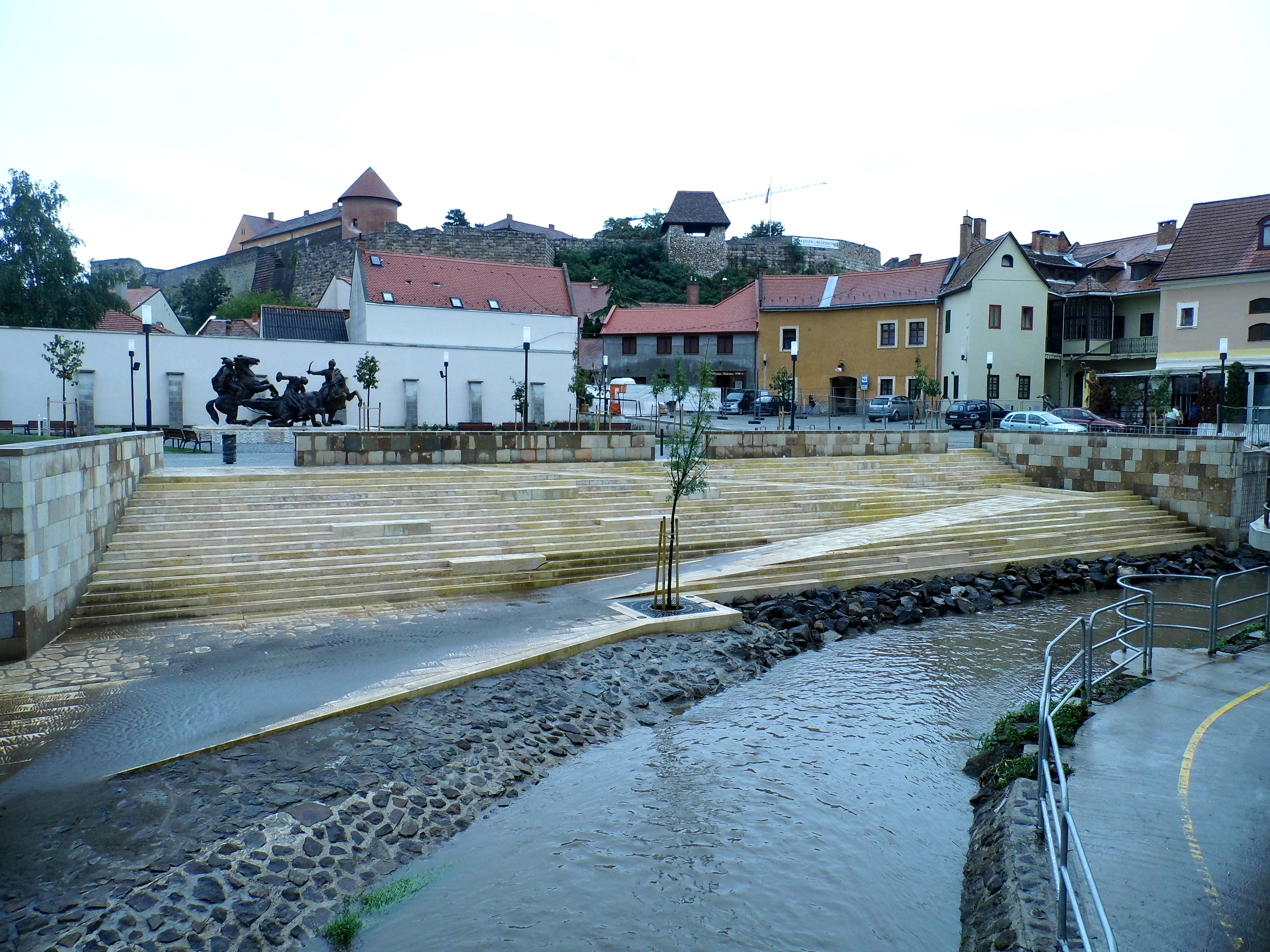
- Eger Stream in Eger

Location
- Country: Hungary

Physical characteristics
- Source: Close to the village of Balaton, Bükk Mountains
  - location: Hungary
  - coordinates: 48.1108°N 20.2884°E
  - elevation: 360 m (1,180 ft)
- Mouth
  - location: Lake Tisza
  - coordinates: 47.6788°N 20.7131°E
  - elevation: 83 m (272 ft)
- Length: 68 km (42 mi)
- Basin size: 1,378.6 km^{2} (532.3 sq mi)
- Discharge
  - average: 3.237 m^{3}/s (114.3 cu ft/s) to 4.105 m^{3}/s (145.0 cu ft/s)

Basin features
- Progression: Tisza→ Danube→ Black Sea
- Tributaries
  - left: Csincse-patak, Kánya-patak, Tárkányi-patak, Gilitka-patak, Recska-patak
  - right: Almár-patak, Villói-patak, Bekölcei-patak

Eger (Hungarian: Eger-patak; "Eger Stream") is the longest watercourse in and around the city Eger in Hungary. From the area by the village of Balaton, by the Vajda well, the stream flows through the valley of Eger between the Bükk and Mátra mountains. After 68 kilometers in a south-easterly direction, the stream empties into Lake Tisza (Tisza) from the right side. The length of the main branch is about 40 kilometers. Almost the entire area of the districts of Eger and Bélapátfalva lies in the catchment area of the watercourse, therefore it is a crucial component in the hydrography of the region. The stream is part of the Eger–Laskó–Csincse water system.

The stream is known by the name Rima (Rima-patak) in the lower reaches, downstream from the village of Nagytálya.

== Geography ==
The Eger stream originates in the western foothills of the Bükk Mountains, in the Ózd-Egercsehi basin, at an altitude of 360 metres above sea level. The stream runs southwards across the foothills of the western half of the mountain range in the north-south direction in the trench of its own fault line, then cuts through the Egri-Bükk valley to the Hevesi plain, which forms the northern edge of the lowlands, and then turns eastwards across the county border to form the western edge of the Borsodi-Mezőség region. The stream finally flows into the artificially created Lake Tisza between Poroszló and Négyes at an altitude of 89 m above sea level. When the reservoir was created, a large stretch of the former bed of the Eger stream and its surroundings was brought below the water level of the artificial lake. At the low water level of Lake Tisza, the former bed is still visible in places.

== Tributaries ==
The main tributaries of the Eger:

| Left | Right | Length (km) | Basin size (km^{2}) | Average discharge (m^{3}/s) |
|---|---|---|---|---|
| | Bekölcei-patak | 7 | 21 | 0.057 |
| | Villói-patak | 10.5 | 22.3 | 0.061 |
| Gilitka-patak | | 8.5 | 4.7 | |
| Tárkányi-patak | | 16.4 | 103.4 | 0.369 |
| Ostoros-patak | | 30.4 | 105.7 | 0.414 |
| Kánya-patak | | 35 | 262.8 | 0.569 |
| Csincse | | 48 | 430.4 | 1.849 |
| Eger | | 68 | 1,378.6 | 4.105 |

The main watercourses of the Eger stream catchment

| River | Mouth coordinates | Source level (m) | Estuary level (m) | Highest point (m) | Length (km) | Basin size (km^{2}) | Average discharge (m^{3}/s) |
|---|---|---|---|---|---|---|---|
| Eger-patak | 47°40′24.7404″N 20°42′44.7012″E | 360 | 89 | 959 | 87.4 | 1378.6 | 4.105 |
| Bekölcei-patak | 48°3′53.1396″N 20°19′1.9848″E | 380 | 280 | 457 | 7 | 21 | 0.057 |
| Recska-patak | 48°3′14.6628″N 20°19′2.982″E | 550 | 290 | 880 | 6.5 | 24.5 | 0.091 |
| Kecső-patak | 48°3′39.168″N 20°19′59.3436″E | 368 | 291 | 880 | 5.5 | | |
| Melés-patak | 48°2′13.7004″N 20°19′26.886″E | 482 | 299 | 880 | 4.0 | | |
| Villó-patak | 47°59′39.7716″N 20°19′16.2588″E | 330 | 250 | 454 | 10.5 | 22 | 0.061 |
| Mónos-patak | 48°1′58.8036″N 20°19′32.3004″E | 350 | 272 | 525 | 1.5 | | |
| Gilitka-patak | 47°59′13.7112″N 20°20′4.0344″E | 380 | 248 | 630 | 8.5 | 4.7 | |
| Almár-patak | 47°57′23.9904″N 20°21′21.9852″E | 328 | 189 | 396 | 4.5 | | |
| Tárkányi-patak | 47°55′58.8504″N 20°21′56.142″E | 275 | 180 | 959 | 16.4 | 103.4 | 0.369 |
| Löki-patak | 47°59′31.7004″N 20°27′30.1644″E | 500 | 275 | 959 | 6.5 | 9.2 | |
| Tárkányi-víz | 47°59′31.7004″N 20°27′30.1644″E | 500 | 275 | 554 | 4.5 | 6.6 | |
| Vöröskő-patak | 47°58′44.1156″N 20°25′44.1948″E | 400 | 210 | 950 | 8 | 29.3 | 0.096 |
| Hideg-patak | 47°59′41.64″N 20°26′9.0312″E | 554 | 257 | 899 | 6.8 | 0.038 | |
| Peskő-völgyi-patak | 47°59′41.6508″N 20°26′9.0096″E | 557 | 318 | 899 | 4.5 | | |
| Mellér-völgyi-patak | 47°58′39.2124″N 20°25′18.588″E | 600 | 208 | 791 | 8.5 | 8.6 | |
| Mész-völgyi-patak | 47°58′12.1908″N 20°24′38.1564″E | 662 | 208 | 815 | 9 | | |
| Berva-patak | 47°56′28.6404″N 20°22′51.3516″E | 518 | 186 | 645 | 11.5 | 16.9 | 0.054 |
| Ostoros-patak | 47°44′2.9148″N 20°32′31.1352″E | 207 | 100 | 569 | 30.4 | 105.6 | 0.414 |
| Novaji-patak | 47°48′12.1212″N 20°30′23.598″E | 163 | 124 | 336 | 9 | 33.1 | 0.06 |
| Kánya-patak | 47°42′24.948″N 20°38′54.2904″E | 470 | 94 | 950 | 35 | 262.8 | 1.054 |
| Hór-patak | 47°42′24.9696″N 20°38′54.2652″E | 503 | 106 | 950 | 30.5 | 151.7 | 0.497 |
| Mész-patak | 47°56′37.2552″N 20°32′21.498″E | 260 | 212 | 595 | 3.5 | | |
| Cseresznyés-patak | 47°55′30.5976″N 20°31′55.6212″E | 466 | 192 | 658 | 8 | 9.8 | |
| Szoros-patak | 47°46′50.0556″N 20°35′18.5496″E | 412 | 172 | 669 | 9.5 | 16.9 | 0.066 |
| Kövesdi-ér | 47°44′25.8396″N 20°38′38.4684″E | 106 | 96 | 111 | 7.5 | | |
| Csincse | 47°45′10.6308″N 20°42′13.446″E | 337 | 92 | 720 | 48 | 430.4 | 1.849 |
| Geszti-patak | 47°42′18.558″N 20°41′5.5044″E | 260 | 120 | 316 | 13 | 27.8 | 0.11 |
| Kis-Csincse | 47°54′19.9152″N 20°44′1.8636″E | 207 | 105 | 224 | 9 | 29.3 | 0.076 |
| Nagy-Csincse | 47°48′31.9824″N 20°44′58.4304″E | 337 | 95 | 720 | 34.2 | 145.1 | 0.478 |
| Kácsi-patak | 47°48′31.9824″N 20°44′58.4304″E | 230 | 95 | 683 | 26 | 170.2 | 0.552 |
| Sályi-patak | 47°51′54.6984″N 20°41′9.4668″E | 216 | 113 | 668 | 19 | 57.2 | 0.183 |
| Réti-patak | 47°51′5.4828″N 20°40′54.5592″E | 305 | 112 | 377 | 11.5 | 22.3 | 0.073 |
| Gyilkos-ér | 47°48′33.0264″N 20°44′55.5828″E | 110 | 95 | 115 | 8 | 18 | 0.078 |
| Lator-patak | 47°46′29.2944″N 20°43′51.1464″E | 290 | 94 | 377 | 28.5 | 55.5 | 0.203 |
| Cserépváraljai-patak | 47°53′31.0704″N 20°35′18.312″E | 212 | 142 | 325 | 8 | 13.3 | 0.04 |
| Tardi-ér | 47°45′10.6308″N 20°42′13.446″E | 116 | 94 | 180 | 11.5 | 40.7 | 0.241 |
