= Borzhava =

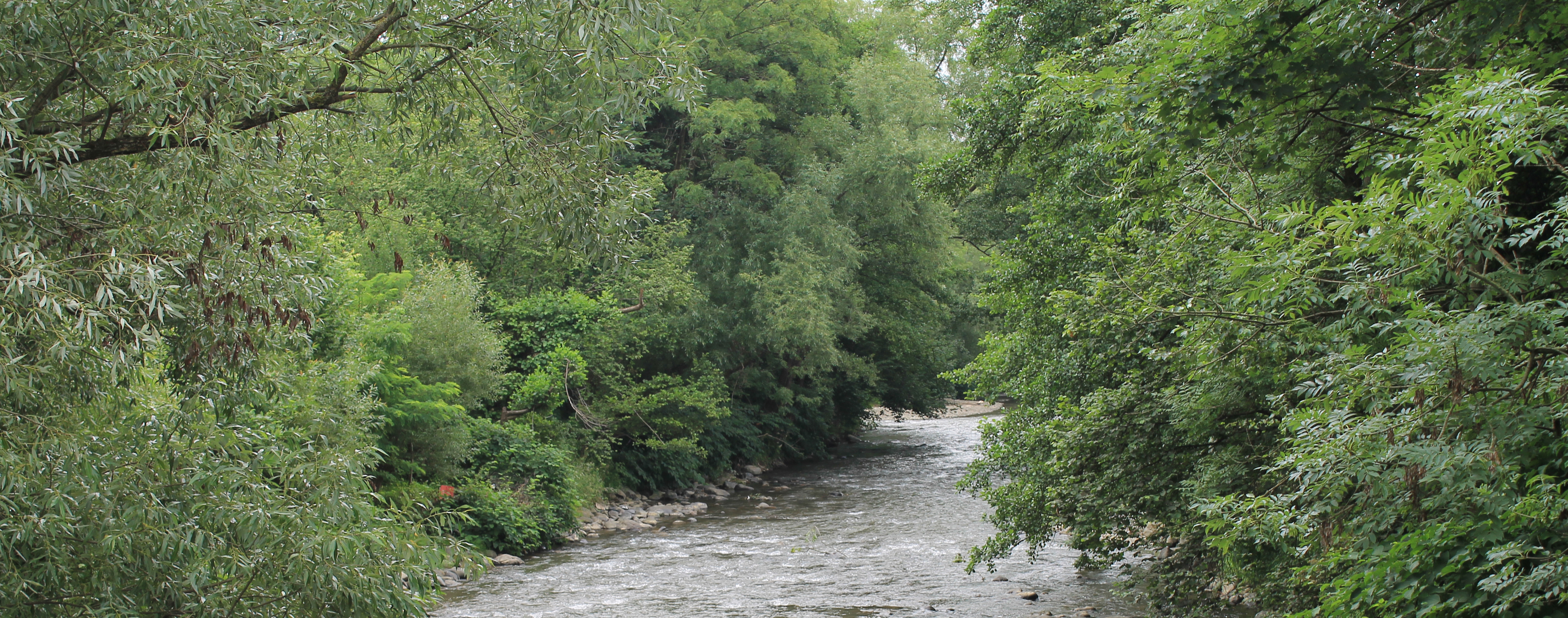

Location
- Country: Ukraine

Physical characteristics
- Source
  - location: Eastern Carpathians
- Mouth
  - location: Tisza at Vary
  - coordinates: 48.1107°N 22.7064°E
- Basin size: 1,450 km^{2} (560 sq mi)

Basin features
- Progression: Tisza→ Danube→ Black Sea

The Borzhava (Ukrainian: Боржава; Hungarian: Borzsa) is a right tributary of the river Tisza in the Zakarpattia Oblast, western Ukraine. Its basin covers an area of 1,450 km^{2} (560 sq mi). It rises in the Eastern Carpathians. It discharges into the Tisza near Vary, on the border with Hungary.
