= Dubove, Zakarpattia Oblast =

Rural locality in Zakarpattia Oblast, Ukraine

Dubove Дубове Dombó • Дубовое
- Rural settlement
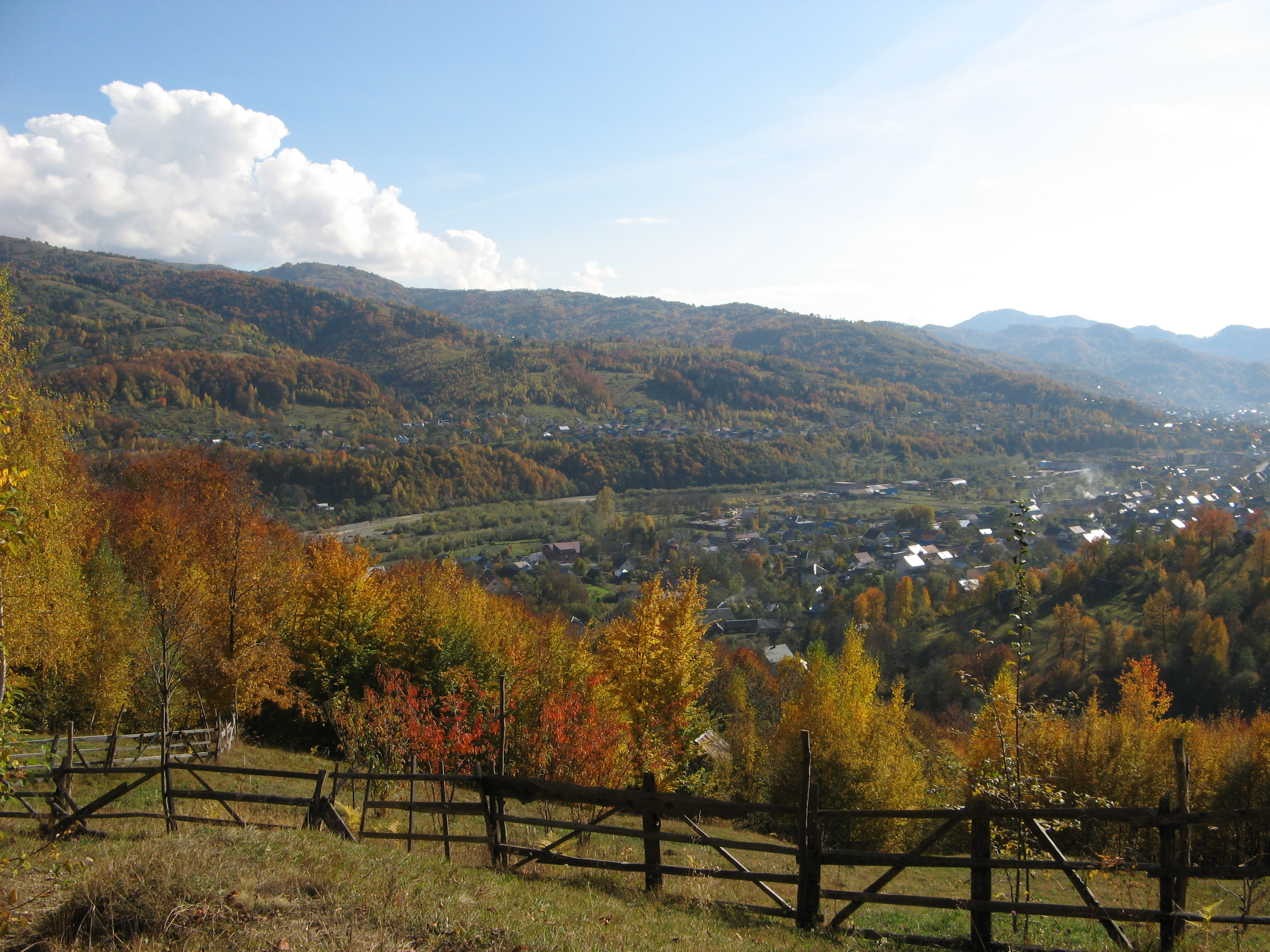
- The mountain village of Dubove

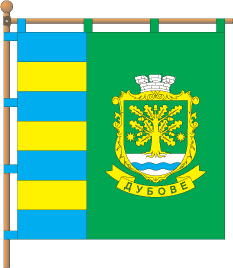
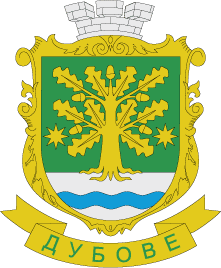
- Flag Coat of arms
- Interactive map of Dubove
- Location within Zakarpattia Oblast Location within Ukraine
- Coordinates: 48°11′10″N 23°53′02″E
- Country: Ukraine
- Oblast: Zakarpattia Oblast
- Raion: Tiachiv Raion
- Elevation: 411 m (1,348 ft)

Population
  - Total: 9,848 (2022 estimate)
- Time zone: UTC+2 (EET)
  - Summer (DST): UTC+3 (EEST)
- Postal code: 90531
- Area code: +380 3134
- KOATUU: 2123656200
- KATOTTH: UA21060070010074038

Dubove (Ukrainian: Дубове; Hungarian: Dombó; Romanian: Delureni; Russian: Дубовое, romanized: Dubovoye; Slovak: Dubové; Yiddish: דיבעווע) is a rural settlement situated in the Carpathian Mountains in Tiachiv Raion, Zakarpattia Oblast, western Ukraine. While officially designated as an urban-type settlement, Dubove's character and composition more closely resembles that of a village. Population: 9,848 (2022 estimate).

== History ==
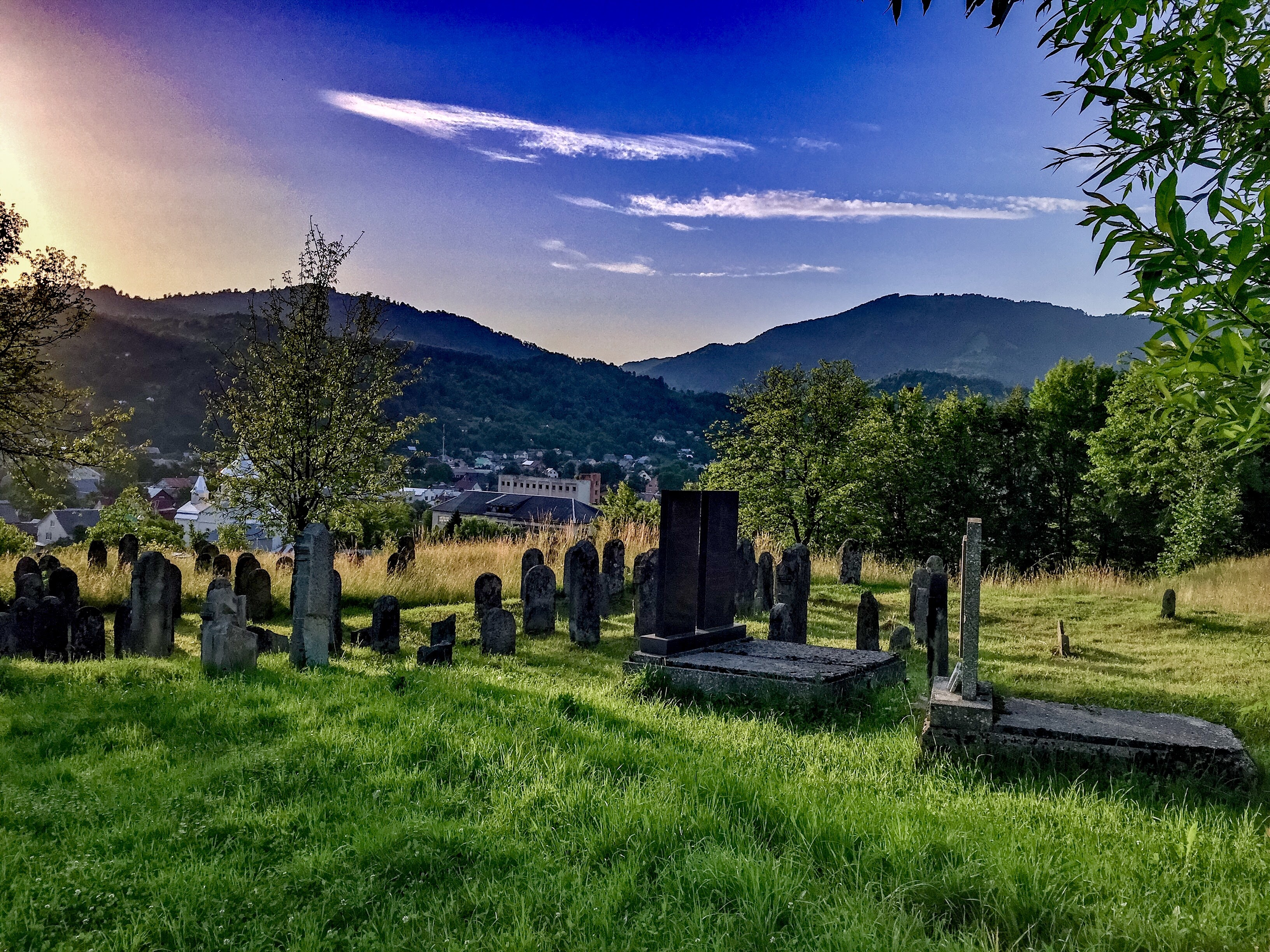
Dubove's old Jewish cemetery. Prior to World War II, the village had a sizable Jewish community.

The area once known as Subcarpathia, which includes present-day Dubove (originally settled as Dombó), was part of the Kingdom of Hungary from the 10th century until 1919. Located in the county of Máramaros, Dombo gained prominence in 1755 when it became the site of the district's forestry office, which drew skilled lumberjacks and their families from Bohemia. Following the end of World War I in 1919, Subcarpathia, including Dombo, was annexed by the newly created Czechoslovak Republic and was given its current name, Dubove, a derivative of the Slavic word for oak tree (дуб, dub).

During World War II, Dubove was occupied by pro-Nazi Hungary. In 1930, 706 (or nearly 16%) of Dubove's 4,416 inhabitants were Jewish. But by the end of World War II, virtually all of the Jews had been exterminated. The Red Army occupied Dubove in 1945 and the village was officially incorporated into the Soviet Union the following year.

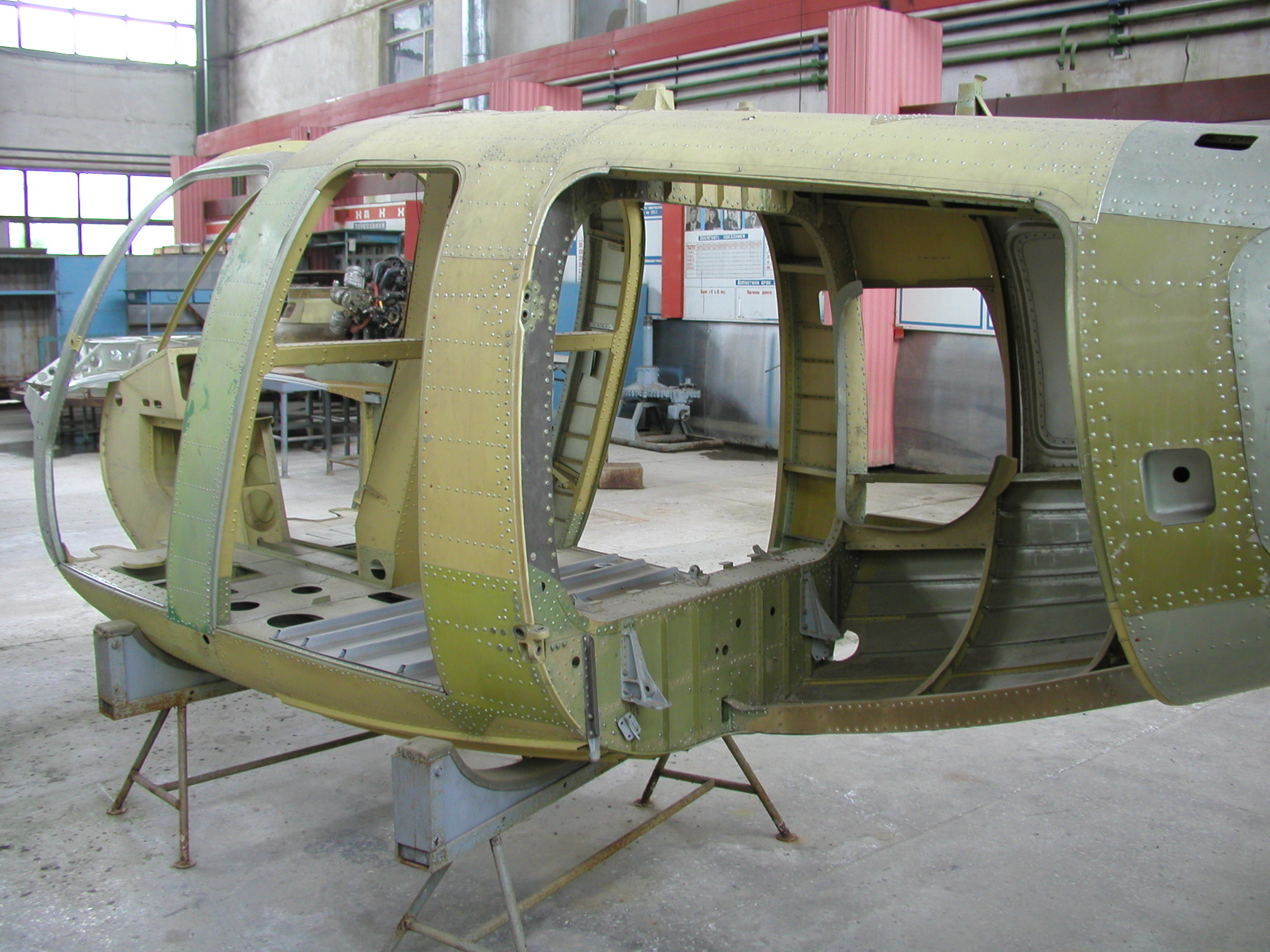
A Mil Mi-34 light helicopter being assembled at Dubove's Zakarpattia Helicopter Production Enterprise

In 1969, Dubove became home to a major Soviet plant, the Zakarpattia Helicopter Production Enterprise, creating an influx of new settlers and eventually raising the population of the village to over 10,000. By far the largest employer in the area, the factory was responsible for funding several projects in the village, including a stadium and technical school. But after the fall of the Soviet Union in 1991, the factory laid off roughly 5,000 workers and Dubove fell on hard times. Although the factory still creates helicopters today, most of its resources are devoted to producing commercial airplane seats, satellite antennas, and children's sleds.

Until 26 January 2024, Dubove was designated urban-type settlement. On this day, a new law entered into force which abolished this status, and Dubove became a rural settlement.

== Geography ==
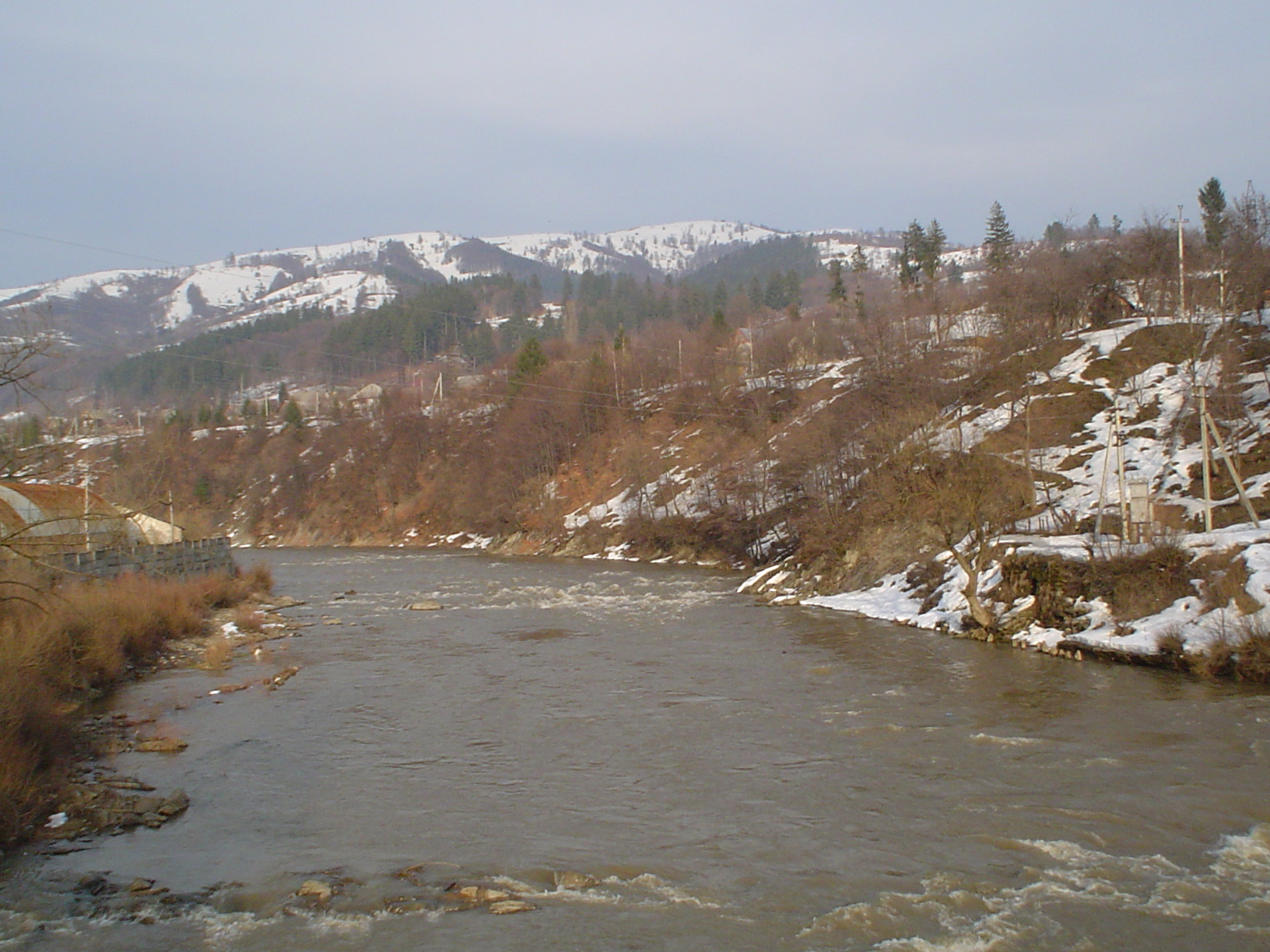
The River Teresva divides part of the village in half.

Dubove is located approximately halfway along the path of the River Teresva. It is regarded as the economic center of the tri-village area, which includes Ganichi and Kalyny.

=== Nearby villages ===
- Krasna - north 5.6 km
- Ust'-Chorna (Királymező in Hungarian and Königsfeld in German) - north 15 km
- Kalyny - south 3 km
- Ganichi - south 6 km
- Neresnytsya - southwest 10.4 km

=== Nearby towns ===
- Tiachiv - southwest 37 km
- Khust - southwest 70 km
- Mukachevo - southwest 120 km

== Education ==
Dubove has one technical school, one secondary school, three primary schools, and a music school.

== Demographics ==
The majority of the inhabitants are Ukrainian, with Russian, Hungarian, and Roma minorities.
