= Kosivka, Kirovohrad Oblast =

Village in Oleksandriia Raion, Kirovohrad Oblast, Ukraine

Kosivka (Ukrainian: Косівка) is a village in Oleksandriia Raion, Kirovohrad Oblast, Ukraine, located at 48°49′00″N 033°01′00″E.
