= Land of the Living =

Land of the Living may refer to:

- Land of the Living (album), an album by Kristine W
  - Land of the Living (Kristine W song)
- Land of the Living (Pam Tillis song)
- Land of the Living (novel), a 2003 novel by Nicci French
