= Győröcske =

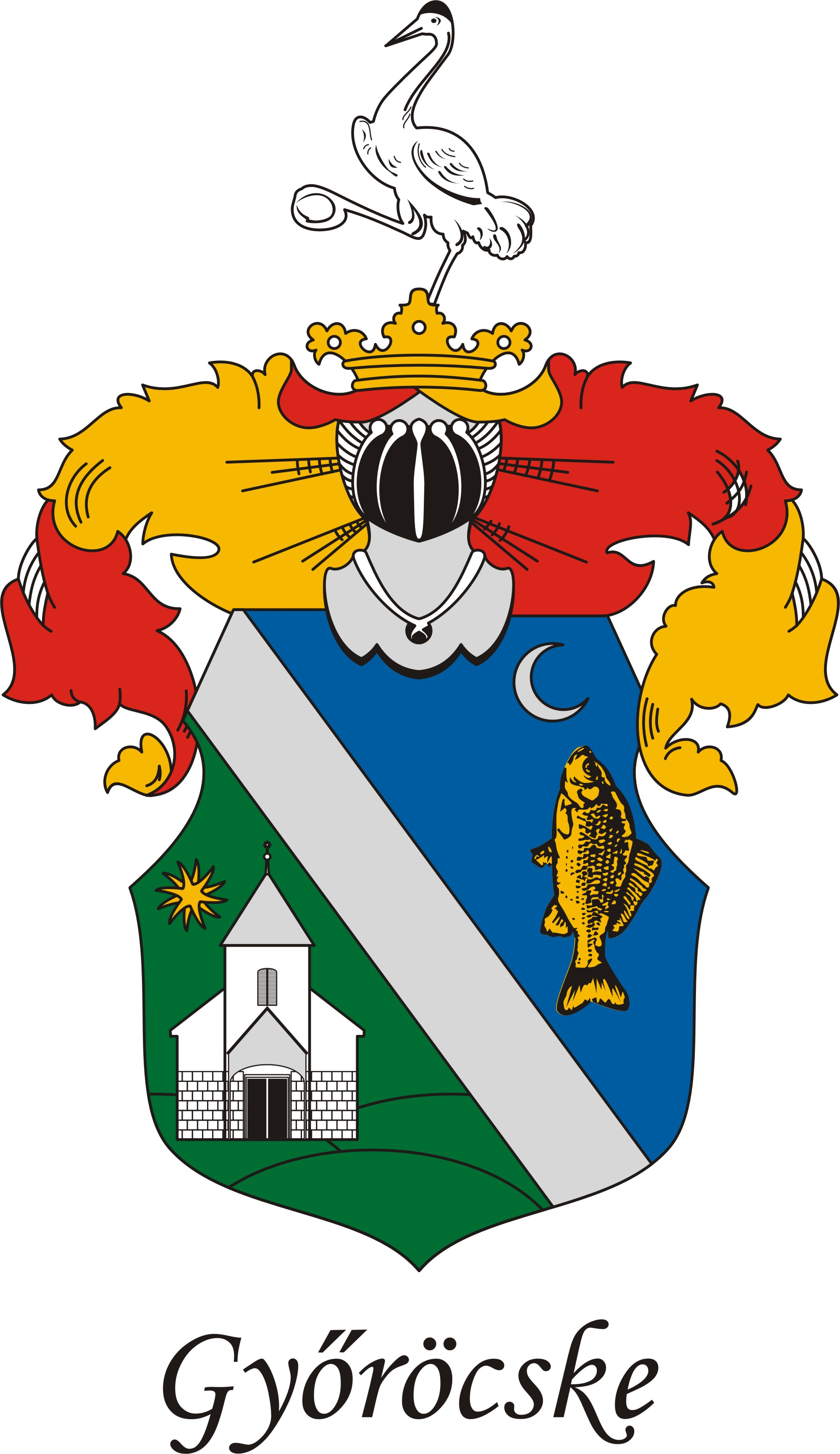
- Coat of arms

- Location of Győröcske in Hungary
- Coordinates: 48.3853608°N 22.1515533°E
- Country: Hungary
- Region: Northern Great Plain
- County: Szabolcs-Szatmár-Bereg

Area
  - Total: 2.08 km^{2} (0.80 sq mi)

Population (2013)
  - Total: 124
  - Density: 59.6/km^{2} (154/sq mi)
- Time zone: UTC+1 (CET)
  - Summer (DST): UTC+2 (CEST)
- Postal code: 4625
- Area code: +36 45

Győröcske is a small village in Szabolcs-Szatmár-Bereg county, in the Northern Great Plain region of eastern Hungary. It is next to the Slovak border (at Malé Trakany) and near the Ukrainian border (at Chop and Solomonovo) and was part of Ung county before the Treaty of Trianon.

== Geography ==
It covers an area of 2.08 km^{2} (1 sq mi) and has a population of 124 people (2013 estimate).

== Population ==
Year	1980	1990	2001	2010	2011	2013
Population	234 (census)	152 (census)	130 (census)	132 (estimate)	129 (census)	124 (estimate)
