= Veľké Trakany =

Municipality of Slovakia

Veľké Trakany Nagytárkány
- Municipality
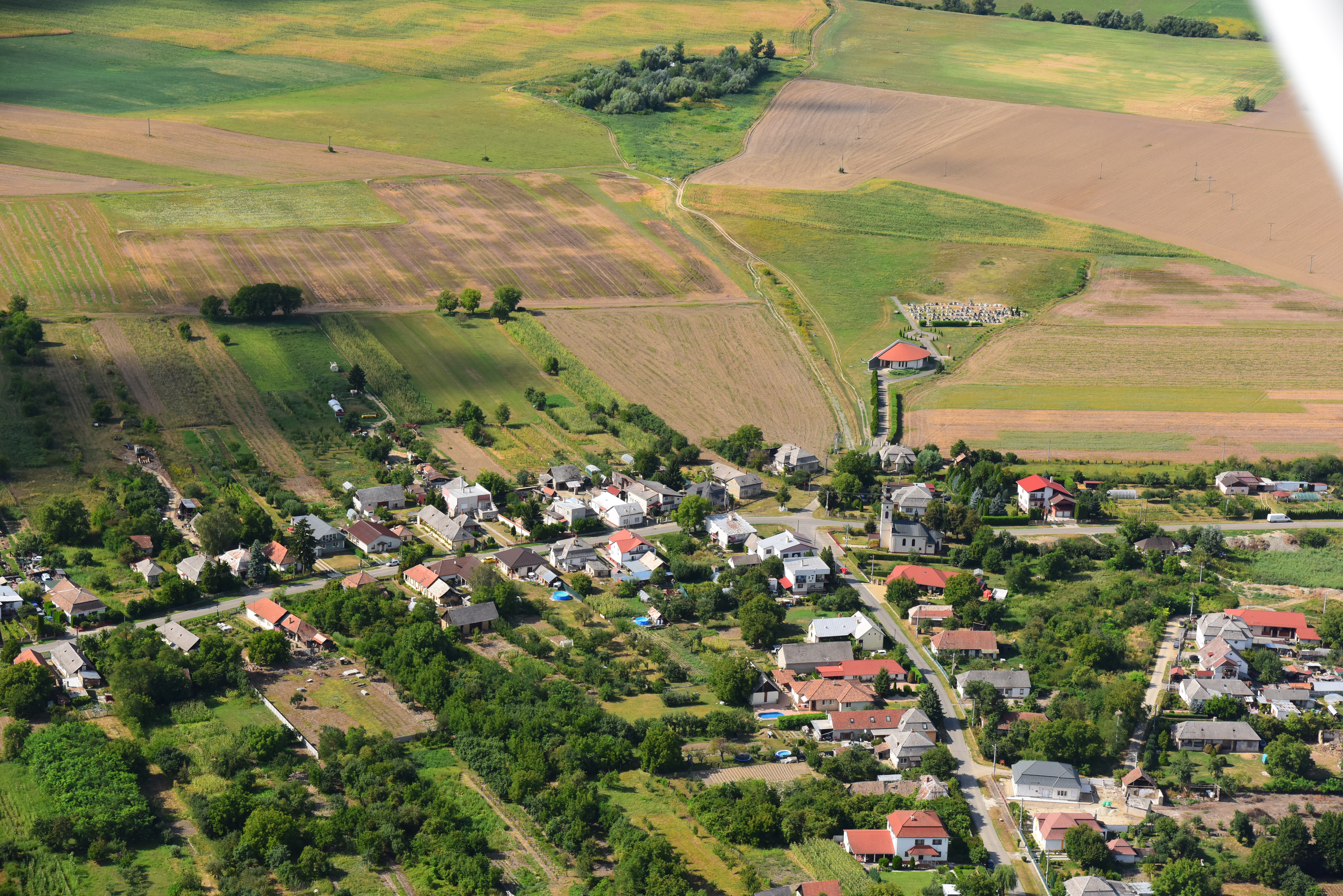
- Aerial view of the village

- Flag

- Location of Veľké Trakany in the Košice Region Location of Veľké Trakany in Slovakia
- Coordinates: 48.38°N 22.10°E
- Country: Slovakia
- Region: Košice Region
- District: Trebišov District
- First mentioned: 1320

Area
  - Total: 10.67 km^{2} (4.12 sq mi)
- Elevation: 101 m (331 ft)

Population (2025)
  - Total: 1,525
- Time zone: UTC+1 (CET)
  - Summer (DST): UTC+2 (CEST)
- Postal code: 764 2
- Area code: +421 56
- Vehicle registration plate (until 2022): TV
- Website: www.velketrakany.sk

Veľké Trakany (Slovak pronunciation: [ˈʋeʎkeː ˈtrakani]; Hungarian: Nagytárkány) is a village and municipality in the Trebišov District in the Košice Region of south-eastern Slovakia.

== History ==
In historical records the village was first mentioned in 1320.

== Geography ==
The municipality lies at an altitude of 101 metres (331 ft) and covers an area of 10.67 km^{2} (4.12 sq mi) (2025). It is next to the Hungarian border (at Tiszabezdéd).

== Population ==
Population statistic (10 years)
Year	1995	2005	2015	2025
Count	1204	1400	1439	1525
Difference		+16.27%	+2.78%	+5.97%

Population statistic
Year	2024	2025
Count	1532	1525
Difference		−0.45%

It has a population of 1525 people (31 December 2025).

=== Ethnicity ===
Census 2021 (1+ %)
Ethnicity	Number	Fraction
Hungarian	1138	76.12%
Slovak	364	24.34%
Not found out	69	4.61%
Total	1495	

In year 2021 was 1495 people by ethnicity 1138 as Hungarian, 364 as Slovak, 69 as Not found out, 5 as Ukrainian, 4 as Romani, 2 as Czech, 2 as German, 1 as Rusyn and 1 as Other.

Note on population: The difference values of population numbers in the table "Population statistic" and in the sections "Ethnicity" & "Religion" is caused by the use of various statistical methods.

=== Religion ===
Census 2021 (1+ %)
Religion	Number	Fraction
Roman Catholic Church	866	57.93%
Calvinist Church	235	15.72%
Greek Catholic Church	161	10.77%
None	117	7.83%
Not found out	59	3.95%
Evangelical Church	18	1.2%
Christian Congregations in Slovakia	17	1.14%
Total	1495	

In year 2021 was 1495 people by religion 866 from Roman Catholic Church, 235 from Calvinist Church, 161 from Greek Catholic Church, 117 from None, 59 from Not found out, 18 from Evangelical Church, 17 from Christian Congregations in Slovakia, 11 from Jehovah's Witnesses, 5 from Eastern Orthodox Church, 3 from Other, 2 from United Methodist Church and 1 from Buddhism.

== Facilities ==
The village has a public library a gym and a football pitch.
