= Kosovskoye Lake =

Lake in Novgorod Oblast, Russia

- Косовское озеро (Russian)
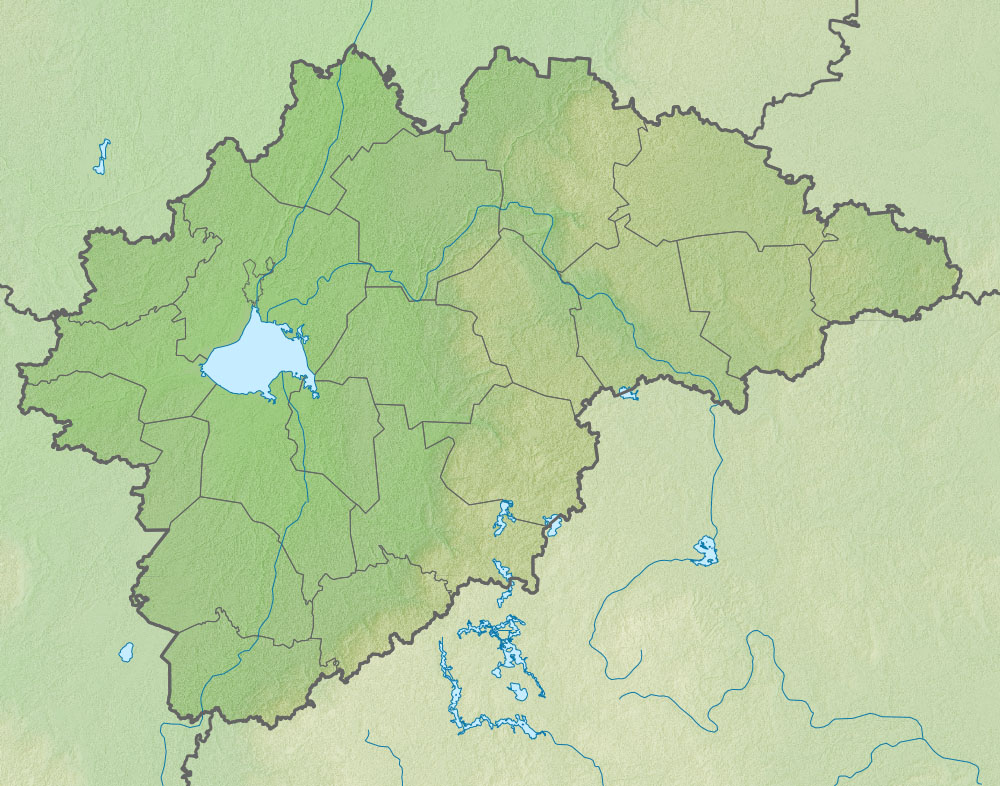
- Location within Novgorod Oblast
- Location: Russia
- Coordinates: 58°21′16″N 30°35′28″E
- Basin countries: Russia
- Surface area: 50 ha (120 acres)

Kosovskoye Lake (Russian: Косовское озеро) is a lake in Russia near Shimsk.
