= Kosivska =

Location
- Country: Ukraine

Physical characteristics
- Source
  - location: Eastern Carpathians
- Mouth
  - location: Tisza near Lunca la Tisa
  - coordinates: 47.9539°N 24.0577°E

Basin features
- Progression: Tisza→ Danube→ Black Sea

Kosivska (Ukrainian: Косівська; Hungarian: Kaszó-patak) is a river in Zakarpattia Oblast of Ukraine. Right tributary of Tisza. It flows into the Tisza at the border with Romania, near the village Lunca la Tisa.

== Sources ==
- Географічна енциклопедія України: в 3-х томах / Редколегія: О. М. Маринич (відпов. ред.) та ін. — К.: «Українська радянська енциклопедія» імені М. П. Бажана, 1989.
