= Bačko Petrovo Selo =

Bačko Petrovo Selo Бачко Петрово Село (Serbian) Péterréve (Hungarian)
- Village (Selo)
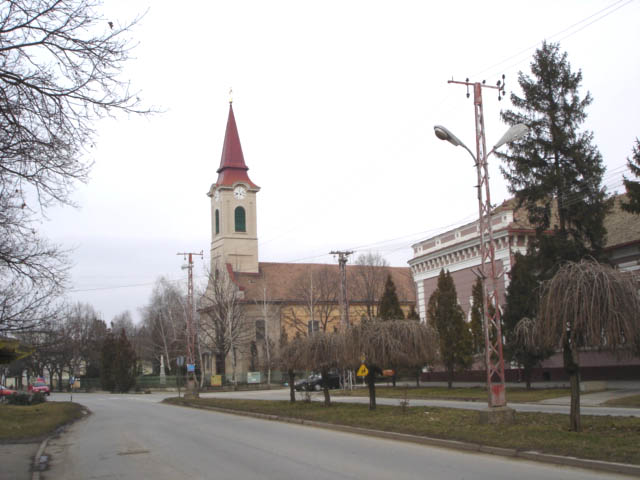
- Center of the village with the Catholic Church

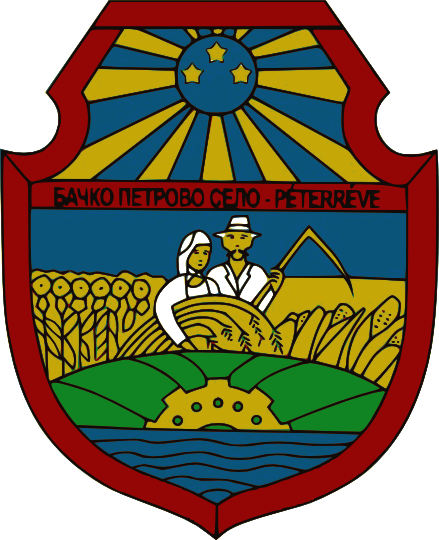
- Seal
- Nickname: Pecelló
- Location within Vojvodina Location within Serbia Location within Europe
- Coordinates: 45°42′N 20°5′E
- Country: Serbia
- Province: Vojvodina
- Region: Bačka (Podunavlje)
- District: South Bačka
- Municipality: Bečej

Area
  - Total: 115.36 km^{2} (44.54 sq mi)
- Elevation: 86 m (282 ft)

Population (2011)
  - Total: 6,350
  - Density: 55.0/km^{2} (143/sq mi)
- Time zone: UTC+1 (CET)
  - Summer (DST): UTC+2 (CEST)

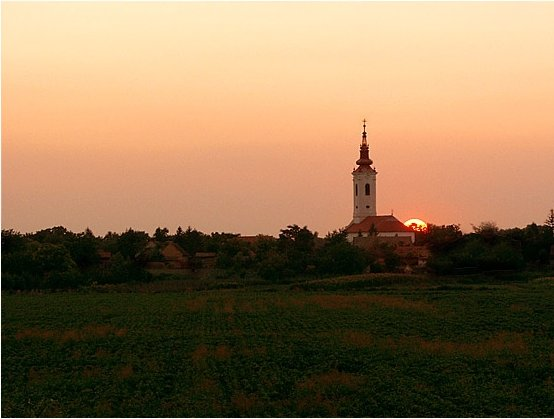
Backo Petrovo Selo and Orthodox Church in sunset

Bačko Petrovo Selo (Serbian Cyrillic: Бачко Петрово Село; Hungarian: Péterréve, German: Batschko Petrovo Selo) is a village located in the Bečej Municipality, in the South Bačka District of Serbia. It is situated in the Autonomous Province of Vojvodina. The village has a Hungarian ethnic majority and its population numbering 7,318 people (2002 census).

== Features ==
The village is located on the right bank of the river Tisa. There are two monuments in the village in memory of the people who lost their lives in the Second World War. After World War II, Bačko Petrovo Selo developed into an economic hub, due to its thriving agricultural industry, however, it experiences an economic downturn nowadays. In the transition era that followed the fall of communism, and the Yugoslav Wars a large percentage of the population lost their jobs and many left the village in search for better opportunities elsewhere.

== Demographics ==
=== Historical population ===
- 1961: 10,410
- 1971: 9,645
- 1981: 8,959
- 1991: 7,958
- 2002: 7,318

=== Ethnic groups ===
Population of the village include (as of 2002 census):

- 5,175 (70.72%) Hungarians
- 1,567 (21.41%) Serbs
- 243 (3.32%) Romani
- others.

== Culture ==
A Serbian Orthodox monastery is Bačko Petrovo Selo's most famous landmark. It features a fountain whose holy water, according to local lore, has healing properties. It attracts many visitors at the celebration day of the monastery every year to take holy water from the fountain.

== Economy ==
Bačko Petrovo Selo has a very developed economy and agriculture. It possess very rich and flat land with highly fertile soil. The village has two economical factories that are indebted to produce fruits and vegetables, which are later delivered to Bečej, to the vegetable factory "Flora".

== Education ==
There is an elementary school in Bačko Petrovo Selo, "Šamu Mihalj" / "Samu Mihály" Elementary School. The school consists of two buildings. The old one houses the classes from the first to the fourth grade and the new from the fifth to the eighth. The lectures are attended in both Serbian and Hungarian, where both nations have their classes in their respective languages.

== Sport ==
Bačko Petrovo Selo has a football (soccer) and handball teams. Both teams are called "Jedinstvo".

== Gallery ==
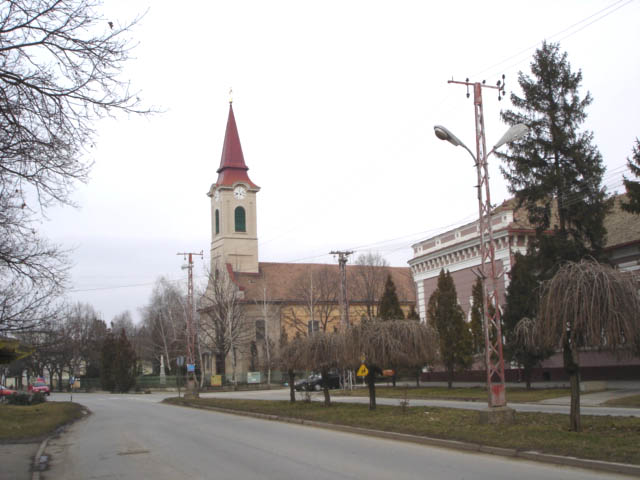
Bačko Petrovo Selo - Péterréve

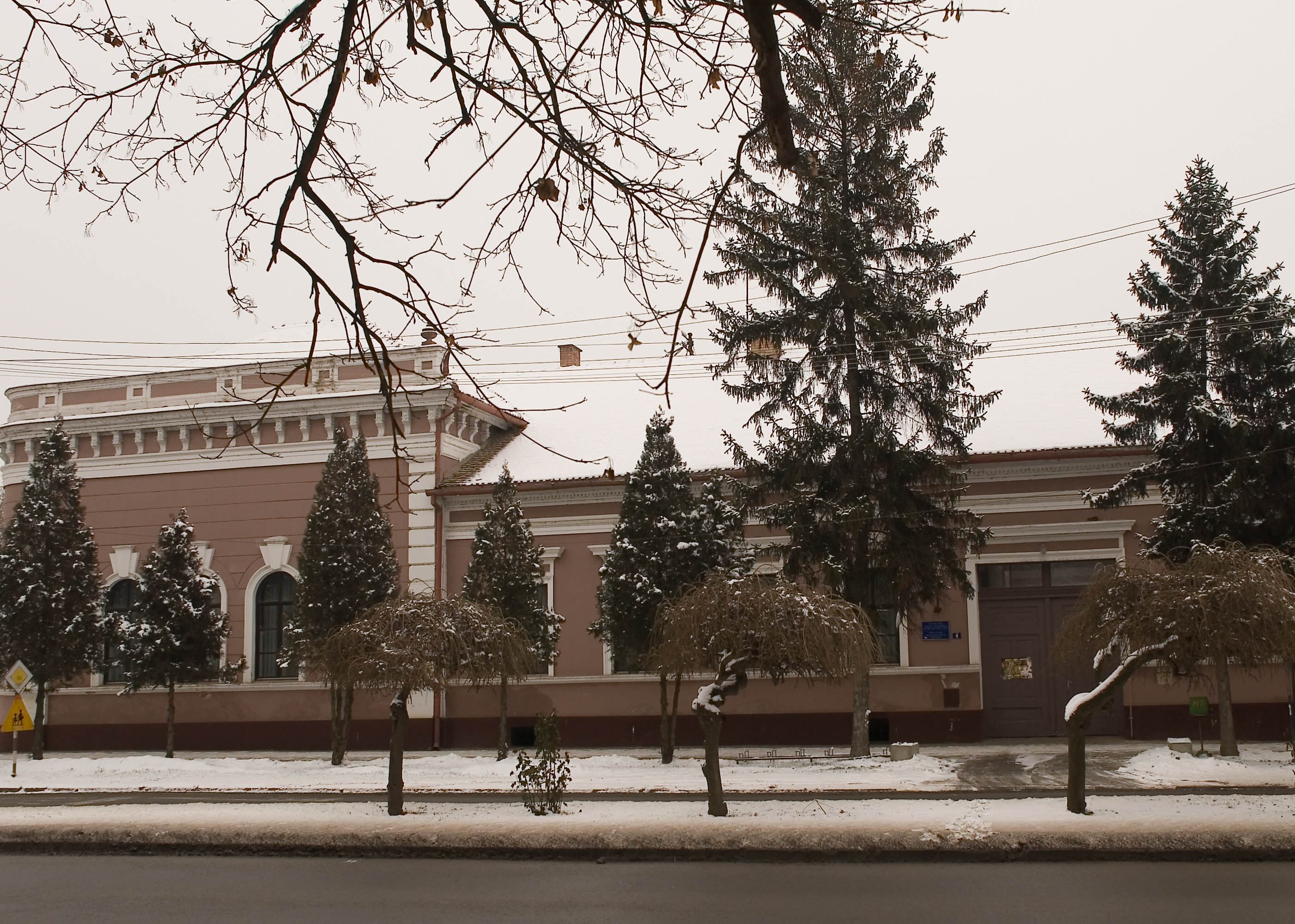
Bačko Petrovo Selo - Péterréve

== Notable individuals ==
- Vikentije II, Serbian Patriarch

== See also ==
- List of places in Serbia
- List of cities, towns and villages in Vojvodina

== Sources ==
- Slobodan Ćurčić, Broj stanovnika Vojvodine, Novi Sad, 1996.
