= List of cities in Zakarpattia Oblast =

Location of cities in Zakarpattia Oblast

There are 11 populated places in Zakarpattia Oblast, Ukraine, that have been officially granted city status (Ukrainian: місто, romanized: misto) by the Verkhovna Rada, the country's parliament. Settlements with more than 10,000 people are eligible for city status, although the status is typically also granted to settlements of historical or regional importance. As of 5 December 2001, the date of the first and only official census in the country since independence, (Note: As of 11 July 2023) the most populous city in the oblast was the regional capital, Uzhhorod, with a population of 117,317 people, while the least populous city was Perechyn, with 7,083 people.

From independence in 1991 to 2020, five cities in the oblast were designated as cities of regional significance (municipalities), which had self-government under city councils, while the oblast's remaining six cities were located amongst thirteen raions (districts) as cities of district significance, which are subordinated to the governments of the raions. On 18 July 2020, an administrative reform abolished and merged the oblast's raions and cities of regional significance into six new, expanded raions. The six raions that make up the oblast are Berehove, Khust, Mukachevo, Rakhiv, Tiachiv, and Uzhhorod.

== List of cities ==
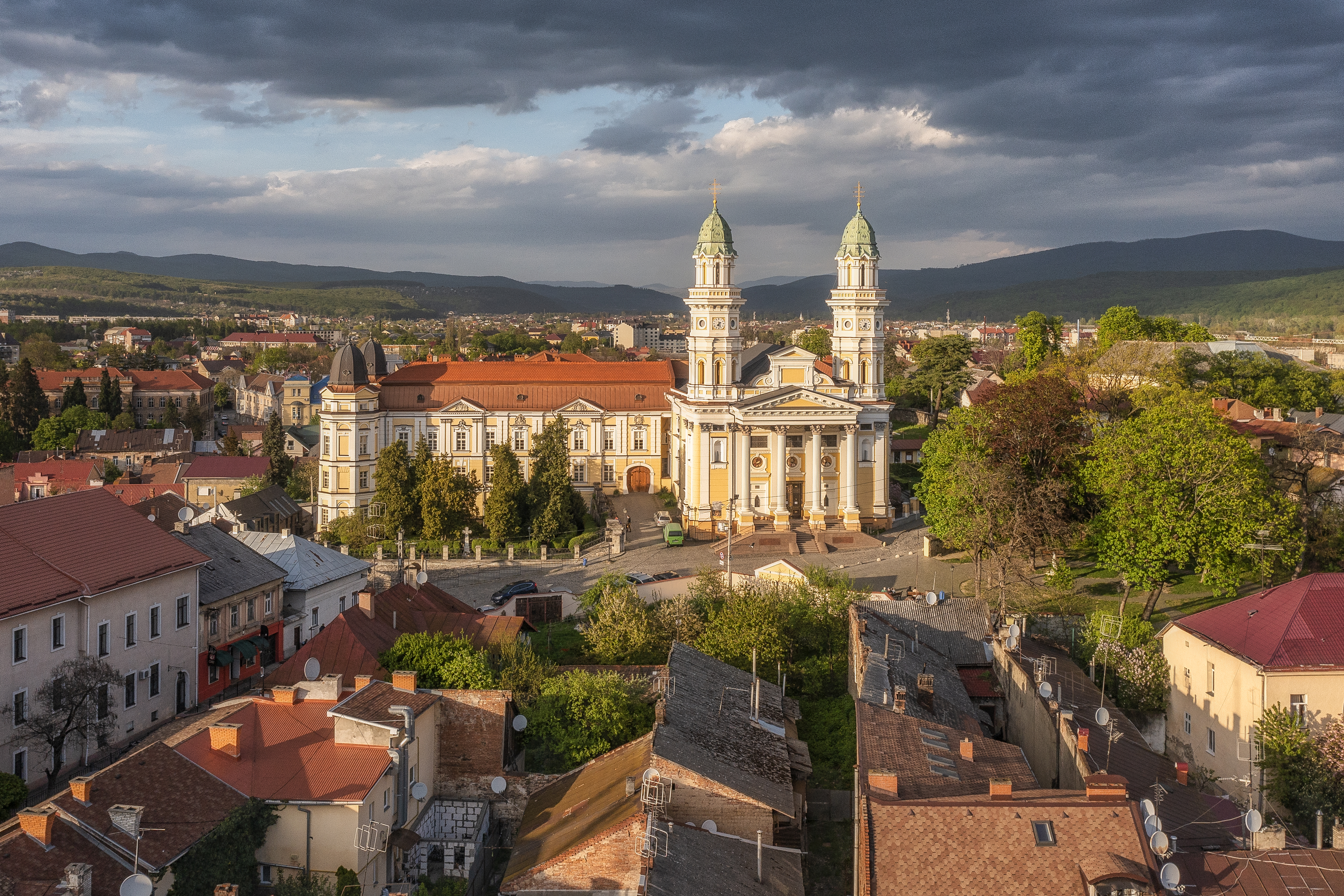
Uzhhorod, capital and most populous city in Zakarpattia Oblast

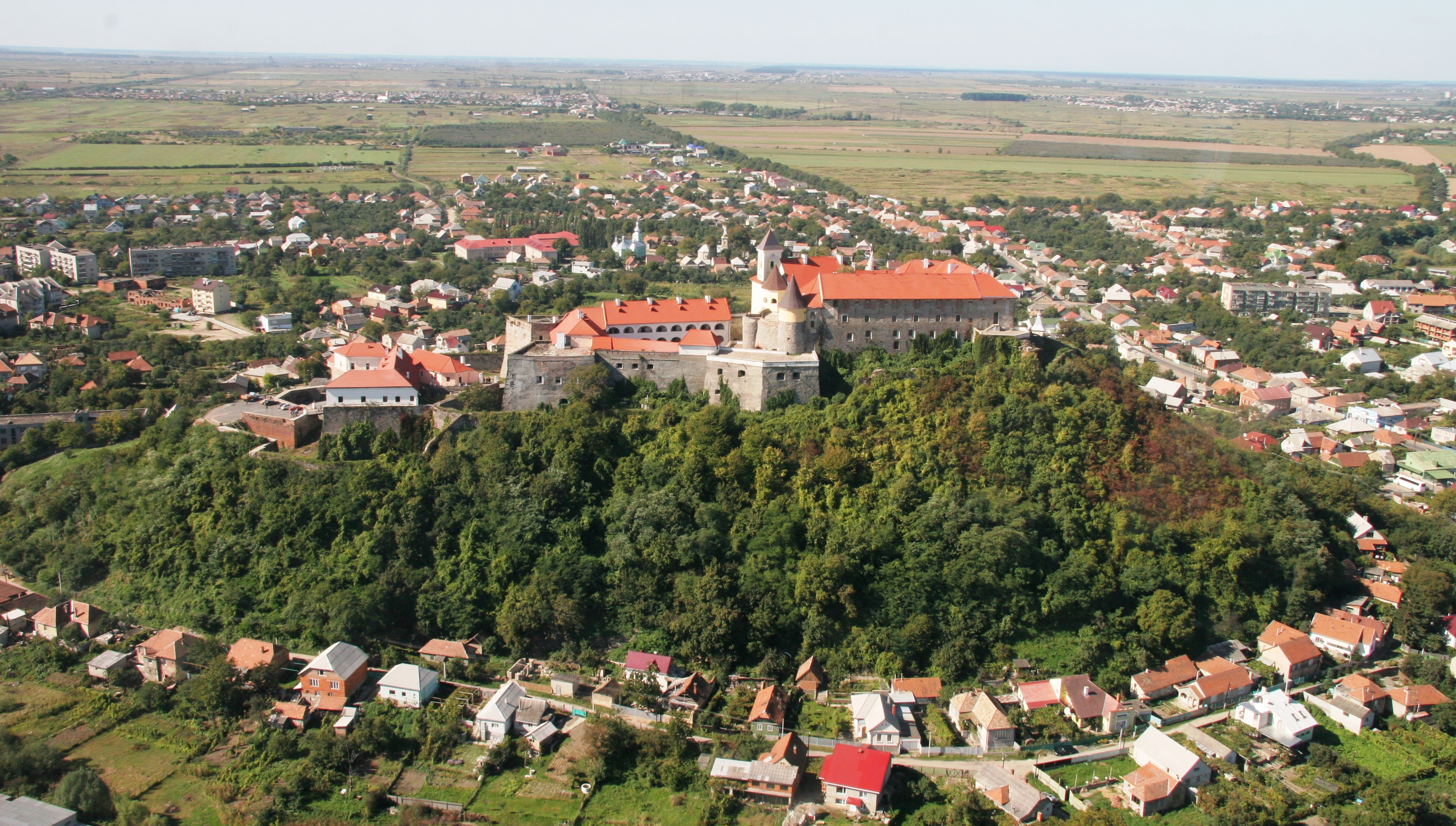
Mukachevo, second most populous city in the oblast known for its castle

Cities in Zakarpattia Oblast
| Name | Name (in Ukrainian) (Note: Links to the Ukrainian Wikipedia articles for each city) | Raion (district) | Population (2022 estimates) | Population (2001 census) | Population change |
|---|---|---|---|---|---|
| Berehove | Берегове | Berehove | 23,325 | 26,735 | −12.75% |
| Chop | Чоп | Uzhhorod | 8,626 | 8,919 | −3.29% |
| Irshava | Іршава | Khust | 9,163 | 9,515 | −3.70% |
| Khust | Хуст | Khust | 28,039 | 29,080 | −3.58% |
| Mukachevo | Мукачево | Mukachevo | 85,569 | 82,346 | +3.91% |
| Perechyn | Перечин | Uzhhorod | 6,477 | 7,083 | −8.56% |
| Rakhiv | Рахів | Rakhiv | 15,536 | 15,241 | +1.94% |
| Svaliava | Свалява | Mukachevo | 17,068 | 17,145 | −0.45% |
| Tiachiv | Тячів | Tiachiv | 8,887 | 9,786 | −9.19% |
| Uzhhorod | Ужгород | Uzhhorod | 115,449 | 117,317 | −1.59% |
| Vynohradiv | Виноградів | Berehove | 25,317 | 25,760 | −1.72% |

== See also ==
- List of cities in Ukraine
