= Soviet annexation of Transcarpathia =

1945–46 land transfer from Czechoslovakia

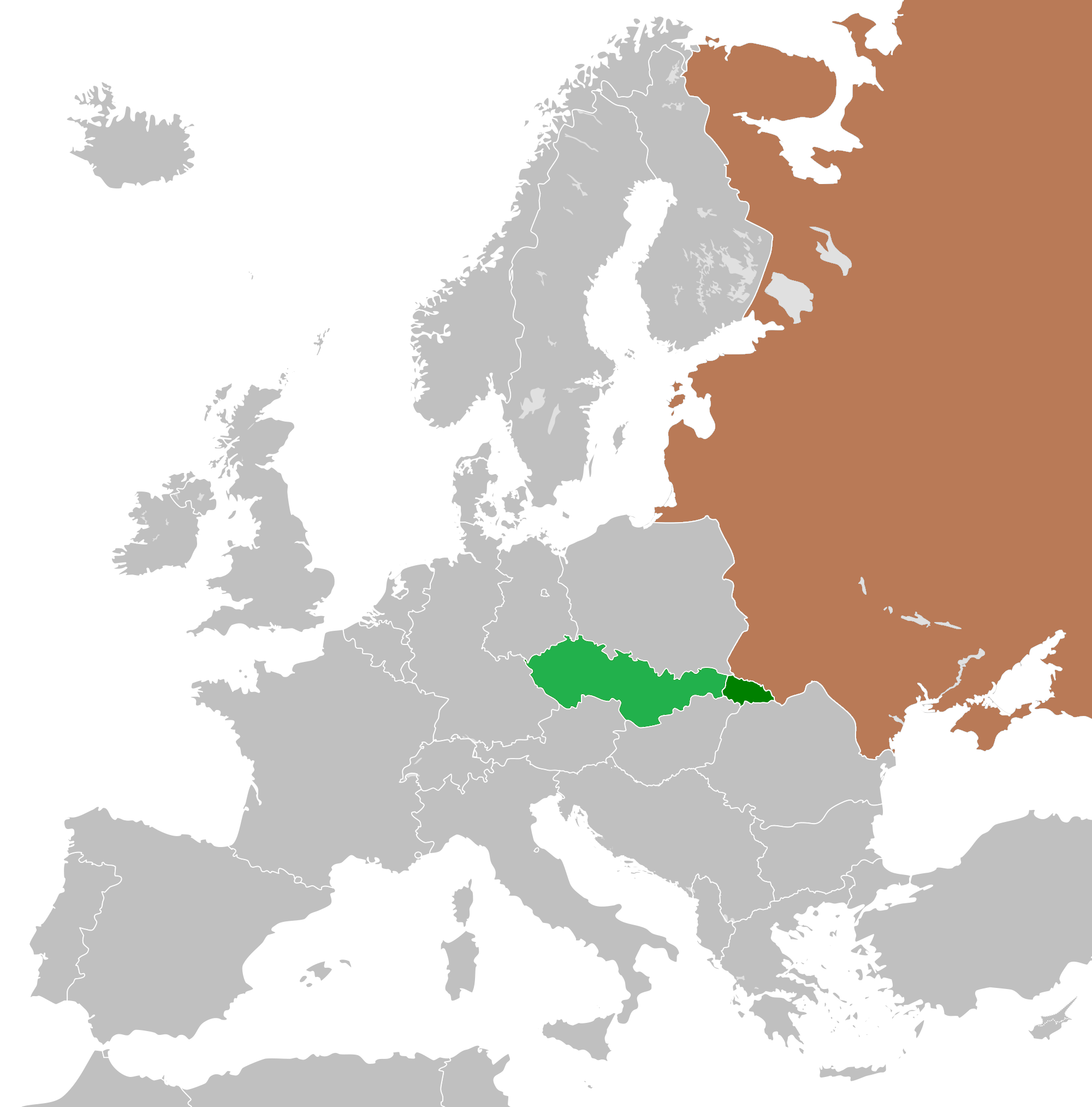
Location of Transcarpathia between Czechoslovakia and the Soviet Union Transcarpathia Czechoslovakia Soviet Union

In 1944 and 1945, the Red Army pushed out the Royal Hungarian Army and took control of Carpathian Ruthenia, also called Transcarpathia. In 1945 and 1946, the region was annexed by the Soviet Union from the Third Czechoslovak Republic, which the Allies considered to be the legal owner of the territory beforehand.

== Previous history ==
At the beginning of the 20th century, the population of the mountainous, economically underdeveloped region known as Carpathian Ruthenia consisted mainly of Ruthenians and Hungarians. The region of Transcarpathia was part of Hungary since the Hungarian conquest of the Carpathian Basin in the end of the 9th century to 1918. Historically it was one of the Lands of the Hungarian Crown before it was detached from the Kingdom of Hungary and attached to the newly created Czechoslovakia in 1918, following the disintegration of Austria-Hungary as a result of World War I. This was then confirmed by the Treaty of Trianon in 1920. However, the autonomy of Carpathian Ruthenia, which was also formally agreed upon in the Treaty of Saint-Germain, was not fully recognized by the Czechoslovak government. When Czechoslovakia came under pressure from Nazi Germany during the Sudeten crisis, nationalists of all stripes seized the opportunity and, beginning in the spring of 1938, attempted to impose full autonomy for Carpatho-Ukraine within the Czechoslovak Republic. About a month after the Munich Agreement of September 1938, an autonomous government was formed under Avgustyn Voloshyn. Hungary had sought to restore its historical borders and the revision of the Treaty of Trianon, on 2 November 1938, the First Vienna Award separated territories from Czechoslovakia, including the southern Carpathian Rus' that were mostly Hungarian-populated and returned them to Hungary. In the dispute between the various ethnic groups, the "Ukrainophiles" now prevailed in Carpathian Ruthenia, who increasingly favored the option of annexation to an independent Ukraine. All political parties except the Ukrainian National Unification were banned. On 14 March 1939, Jozef Tiso proclaimed the independence of Slovakia. Carpathian Ruthenia also declared itself independent. The Hungarian Teleki government and Miklós Horthy were informed by Hitler on 12 March that they had 24 hours to resolve the Ruthenian question. Hungary responded immediately with the military occupation of the entire Carpathian Ruthenia. As a result of the annexation, Hungary gained a territory with 552,000 inhabitants, 70.6% of whom were Ruthenian, 12.5% Hungarian, and 12% were Carpathian Germans.

The region remained under Hungarian control until the end of World War II in Europe, after which it was occupied by the Soviet Union. Hungary had to renounce the territories won in the Vienna Awards in the Armistice Agreement signed in Moscow on January 20, 1945, which stated that:

Hungary has accepted the obligation to evacuate all Hungarian troops and officials from the territory of Czechoslovakia, Yugoslavia, and Rumania occupied by her within the limits of the frontiers of Hungary existing on December 31, 1937, and also to repeal all legislative and administrative provisions relating to the annexation or incorporation into Hungary of Czechoslovak, Yugoslav and Rumanian territory.

The renunciation was reconfirmed at the Paris Peace Conference in 1946 and recorded in the Peace Treaty of 1947, which stated that:

The frontier between Hungary and the Union of Soviet Socialist Republics, from the point common to the frontier of those two States and Rumania to the point common to the frontier of those two States and Czechoslovakia, is fixed along the former frontier between Hungary and Czechoslovakia as it existed on January 1, 1938.

=== Accession to the Ukrainian SSR ===
The London government-in-exile under Edvard Beneš negotiated the restoration of the state of Czechoslovakia with the Soviet Union, with which it had been allied since 1943, in Moscow. On May 8, 1944, Beneš and Soviet leader Joseph Stalin signed a treaty of alliance that guaranteed that the territory of Czechoslovakia would be liberated by the Red Army and returned to Czechoslovak civilian control. Carpathian Ruthenia was to be reincorporated into Czechoslovakia while maintaining this status. In October 1944, Carpathian Ruthenia was liberated by the Red Army and occupied by the Soviet Union. The Czechoslovak government delegation led by minister František Němec arrived in Khust to establish the provisional Czechoslovak administration, according to the treaties between the Soviet and Czechoslovak governments on 8 May 1944. According to the Soviet–Czechoslovak treaty, it was agreed that once any liberated territory of Czechoslovakia ceased to be a combat zone of the Red Army, those lands would be transferred to full control of the Czechoslovak state. However, after a few weeks, the Red Army and NKVD started to obstruct the Czechoslovak delegation's work. Communications between Khust and the government center in exile in London were obstructed and the Czechoslovak officials were forced to use underground radio. Furthermore, the delegation had to win the support of the population to remain with Czechoslovakia, because the loyalty of Carpathian Ruthenia to a new Czechoslovak state was weak as a result of World War II. In April 1944, all former collaborators were excluded from the political arena. Collaborators included Magyars, Germans, and those Ruthenians who were supporters of István Fencik's party (which had collaborated with the Magyars). This concerned about one third of the population. Another third were communists, so that only a third of the Ukrainian population probably sympathized with the Czechoslovak Republic.

After arriving in Carpathian Ruthenia, the Czechoslovak delegation announced its planned mobilization at its headquarters in Khust on October 30. The Red Army prevented the dissemination of this news and instead began to rally popular support. Protests from Beneš's government were ignored. The Czechoslovak delegation was also allegedly hindered in building relations with the Ukrainian minority, which caused the disappointment of the population. Soviet activities resulted in 73% of the population being in favor of annexation.

== Soviet annexation ==
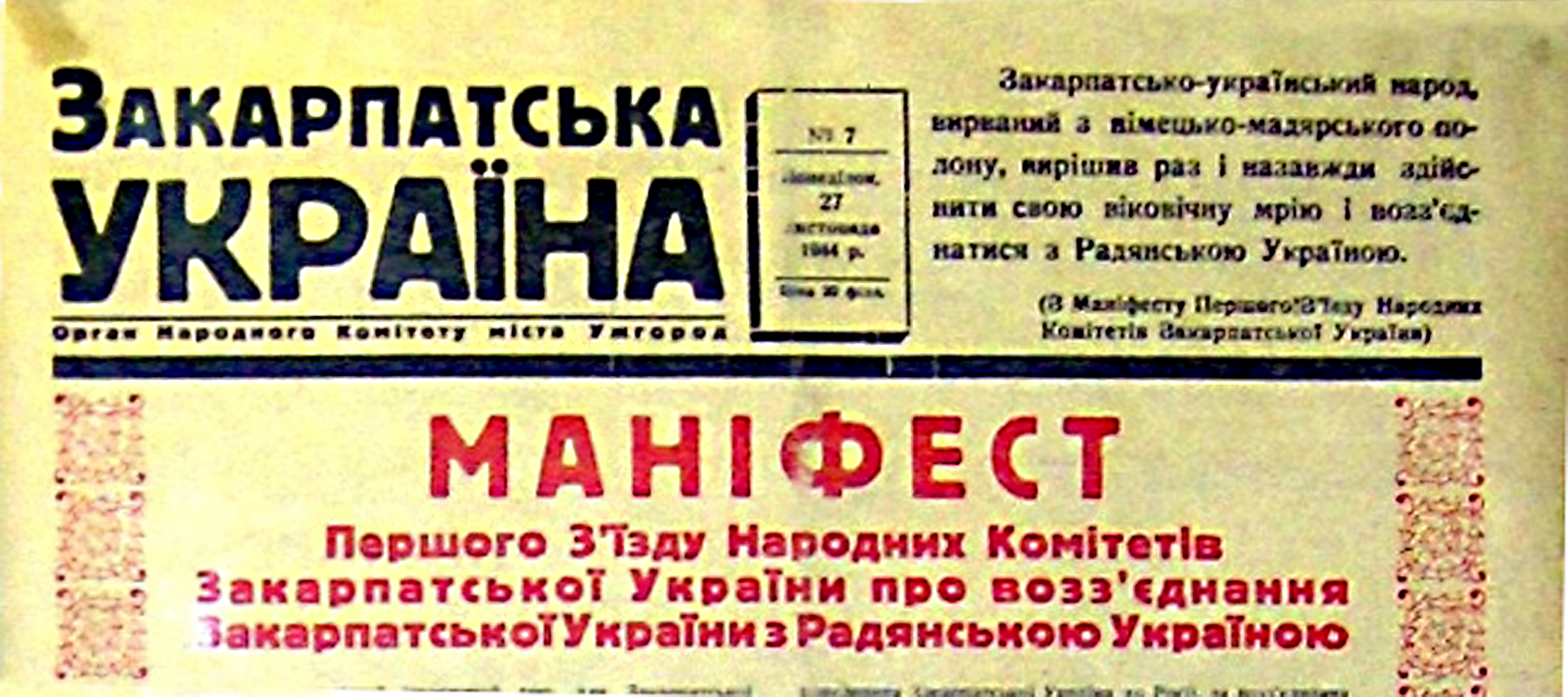
Front page of the Zakarpattia Ukraine newspaper (1944) with manifest of unification with Soviet Ukraine

On 26 November 1944, the first meeting of the newly elected People's Committee, organized by representatives of the Communist Party of Carpathian Ruthenia, was held in Mukachevo. It proclaimed withdrawal from Czechoslovakia and "unification with its great mother, Soviet Ukraine." The Czechoslovak delegation was asked to leave the area. After two months of conflicts and negotiations the Czechoslovak government delegation departed from Khust on February 1, 1945, leaving Carpathian Ruthenia under Soviet control.

Nevertheless, negotiations between the Czechoslovak government and the Soviet government were not concluded. While the right-wing conservative Czechoslovak parties voted against a cession, the KSČ promoted a cession of Carpathian Ruthenia. At the end of 1945, Beneš also confirmed the cession. An agreement was reached with the Soviet Union to postpone the annexation until 1946; the cession to the Soviet Union was agreed by treaty in Moscow on June 29, 1945, and the agreement entered into force on January 30, 1946. Czechoslovaks and Ukrainians living in Carpathian Ruthenia were given the choice between Czechoslovak and Soviet citizenship.

== Consequences ==
Over 120,000 people emigrated from the former part of the country. Of the 15,800 Ruthenian Jews, 8,000 emigrated. As a result of the cession, Czechoslovakia lost 12,777 km^{2} (4,933 sq mi) of its territory and about 450,000 inhabitants.

== Literature ==
- Paul Robert Magocsi: The Shaping of a National Identity. Subcarpathian Rus', 1848–1948. Cambridge, Massachusetts/London, 1978.
- Vincent Shandor: Carpatho-Ukraine in the Twientieth Century. A Political and Legal History. Cambridge, Mass.: Harvard U. P. for the Ukrainian Research Institute, Harvard University, 1997.
- Ivan Pop: Enzyklopedija Podkarpatskoj Rusi, Uschhorod 2001 (Ukrainian); Encyclopedia of Rusyn history and culture, University of Toronto Press, 2002/05, ISBN 0-8020-3566-3
