= Vorozheska =

Lake in Ukraine

Lake Vorozheska
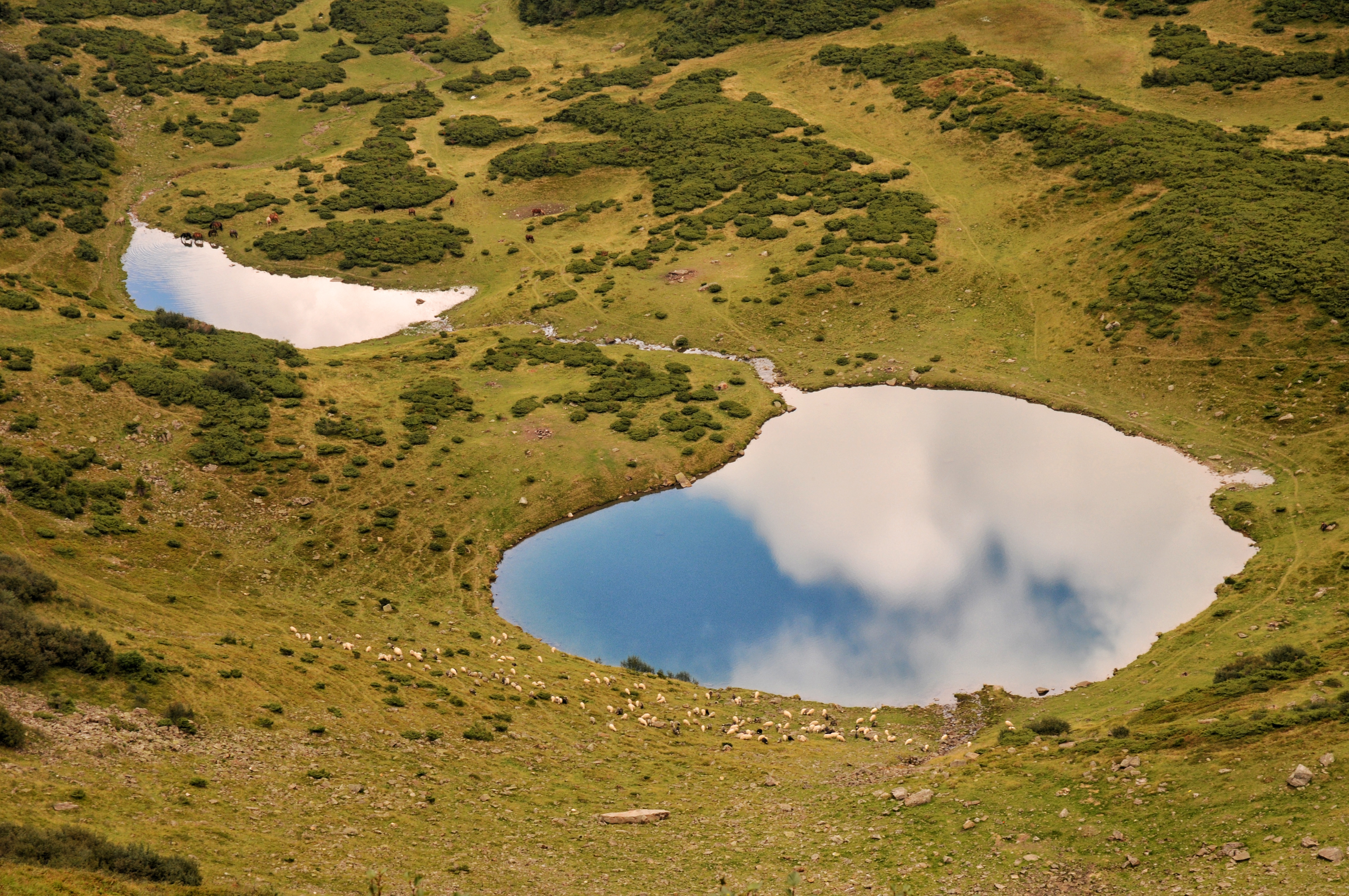

- Location within Zakarpattia Oblast Location within Ukraine
- Interactive map of Lake Vorozheska
- Location: Rakhiv Raion, Zakarpattia Oblast
- Coordinates: 48°16′34″N 24°11′34″E
- Basin countries: Ukraine
- Surface area: 0.9 ha (2 acres)
- Max. depth: 4.5 m (15 ft)
- Surface elevation: 1,460 m (4,790 ft)

Lake Vorozheska (Ukrainian: озеро Ворожеська) is a lake in the Carpathian Mountains of Ukraine. It is a hydrological natural monument of local significance.

Lake Vorozheska is located on the northern slopes of the Svydovets massif at an elevation of 1,460 metres (4,790 ft) above sea level. It has glacial origin and is situated in a cirque. The lake consists of two connected bodies of water, a bigger and a smaller one. The water of the lake is clear and cool. Thickets of juniper and blueberry grow around it.
