= Sub-Carpathian Reformed Church =

The Sub-Carpathian Reformed Church (SCRC) (Ukrainian: Закарпатська Реформатська Церква, romanized: Zakarpatska Reformatska Tserkva; Hungarian: Kárpátaljai Református Egyház(kerület)) is a Christian Reformed Protestant association in Ukraine that traces its roots to the works of Huldrych Zwingli and John Calvin from the 1520s and 1530s. By 2007, it had 105 communities, 55 ministers and 105 churches. The Church is located in the Sub-Carpathian region, with its center in Berehove (Beregszász). The area borders on several Eastern European countries, and is home to various ethnic groups, including Hungarians, Slovaks and Ukrainians.

The SCRC is regarded as the oldest Protestant community in Ukraine, with the first group of Reformers arriving in Sub-Carpathia in the 1530s. It is also the only church of the Calvinist tradition in the region. The Church is organizationally divided into three regions: Uzhanskyi, Berezskyi, Maromorosh-Ugochanskyi, each overseen by the Church's governing board. The highest governing and regulating bodies are the General Assembly and Synod of the Governing Board of the Church. Bishops and members of the Synod are elected for four-year terms. The majority of the SCRC faithful are ethnic Hungarians. The Church promoted the establishment of three specialized secondary schools (with teaching of additional religious and theological subjects), operates 80 Sunday schools, has its special charitable foundation, and publishes a quarterly journal Mission (with 500 copies circulation). Pastoral leaders are educated and trained mainly in Hungary, Romania, and Slovakia. The present leader of the community is Bishop Zán Fábián Sándor (since January 2007). The Church is a member of World Alliance of Reformed Churches and by some estimations involves about 140,000 parishioners.

Several church buildings of reformers are well-known historical monuments and tourist attractions to Zakarpattya, namely a stone Gothic church in Muzhievo (Nagymuzsaly), a Gothic church in Csetfalva (15th century).

Leaders and members of the Sub-Carpathian Reformed Church were persecuted by the communist authorities in the Soviet Union and were sent to Gulag labour camps in Siberia. By some estimations, 40,000 persons from Sub-Carpathia perished between Fall 1944 (when the Soviet Army invaded the territory) and 1956.

== See also ==
- Protestants in Ukraine
