= Zakarpattia Oblast =

Oblast (region) of Ukraine

Zakarpattia Oblast Закарпатська область (Ukrainian) Kárpátalja
- Oblast
- Zakarpatska oblast
- Flag Coat of arms
- Nickname: Закарпаття (Zakarpattia)
- Coordinates: 48.41°N 23.29°E
- Country: Ukraine
- Established: 22 January 1946
- Administrative center: Uzhhorod

Government
  - Governor: Myroslav Biletskyi (RZ)
  - Oblast council: 64 seats
  - Chairperson: Roman Saray

Area
  - Total: 12,777 km^{2} (4,933 sq mi)
  - Rank: Ranked 24th

Population (2022)
  - Total: 1,244,476 ▼
  - Rank: Ranked 15th
  - Density: 97.400/km^{2} (252.26/sq mi)

GDP
  - Total: ₴ 76 billion (€2.0 billion)
  - Per capita: ₴ 60,632 (€1,600)
- Time zone: UTC+2 (EET)
  - Summer (DST): UTC+3 (EEST)
- Postal code: 88-90xxx
- Area code: +380-31
- ISO 3166 code: UA-21
- Vehicle registration: РЕ, АО
- Raions: 6
- Hromadas: 64
- HDI (2022): 0.722 high
- FIPS 10-4: UP25
- NUTS statistical regions of Ukraine: UA71
- Website: carpathia.gov.ua
- ^{1} The Hungarian language has some minority rights in seven villages of the Mukachivskyi Raion.

Zakarpattia Oblast (Ukrainian: Закарпатська область, romanized: Zakarpats'ka Oblast'), also referred to as simply Zakarpattia (Ukrainian: Закарпаття; Hungarian: Kárpátalja), Subcarpathia, or Transcarpathia in English, is an oblast located in the Carpathian Mountains in western Ukraine, mostly coterminous with the historical region of Carpathian Ruthenia. Its administrative centre is the city of Uzhhorod. Other major cities within the oblast include Mukachevo, Khust, Berehove, and Chop, the last of which is home to railroad transport infrastructure.

Zakarpattia Oblast was established on 22 January 1946, following Czechoslovakia's abandonment of its claim to the territory of Subcarpathian Ruthenia (Czech and also Slovak: Podkarpatská Rus) under a treaty between Czechoslovakia and the Soviet Union. The territory of Subcarpathian Ruthenia was then taken over by the USSR and became part of the Ukrainian SSR.

During the Ukrainian independence referendum held in 1991, a referendum on autonomy was also held in the region. 78% of voters voted in favor of autonomy, but the region was never granted an autonomous status.

Situated in the Carpathian Mountains of western Ukraine, except the southwestern Hungarian-populated region that belongs to the Hungarian plain, Zakarpattia Oblast borders four countries: Poland, Slovakia, Hungary, and Romania. Since the Carpathian Mountains have a reputation as an important tourist and travel destination (home to many ski and spa resorts), they play a major role in the oblast's economy.

With a land area of almost 13,000 square kilometres (5,000 sq mi), the oblast is ranked 23rd by area and 15th by population; according to the 2001 Ukrainian Census, the population of Zakarpatska Oblast stood at 1,254,614. In 2022, the region's population was estimated at approximately 1,244,476 (2022 estimate). This total includes people of many nationalities, among which Hungarians, Romanians, and Rusyns constitute significant minorities in some of the province's cities, while in others, they form the majority of the population (as in the case of Berehove).

== Name ==
The oblast's name Zakarpattia (Ukrainian: Закарпаття, romanized: Zakarpattia), which translates as "Transcarpathian" or literally "beyond the Carpathians," refers to its location on the western side of the Carpathian Mountains, a major mountain range that forms an arc across Central and Southeast Europe. As a result, the oblast is also often called Transcarpathian Oblast or Transcarpathia, although the historical region of Transcarpathia also includes areas outside the oblast, specifically small parts of Slovakia (mostly in Prešov Region and Košice Region) as well as Poland's Lemko Region. Other historical names for both the oblast and broader region include Transcarpathian Ruthenia, Transcarpathian Ukraine, and Carpathian Ruthenia. The region is also sometimes referred to as "Subcarpathian" (which translates literally to "below (or "feet of") the Carpathians"), such as in Subcarpathian Rus' and Subcarpathia. This name refers to the area's location in the lower-elevation Carpathian Basin (also known as the Pannonian Basin) and is also a reference to the largely overlapping physical geographical region of Prykarpattia (the Ukrainian name for Ciscarpathia), which encompasses the northeastern foothills of the Carpathian Mountains.

Many historical names included Rus' or Ruthenian when referring to the region because of the area's large population of Rusyns (also known as Carpatho-Rusyns, Ruthenians, or Rusnaks), an East Slavic ethnic group that speaks the Rusyn language and descends from the original East Slavic population that had inhabited the northeastern regions of the Eastern Carpathians since the Early Middle Ages. Transcarpathian/Carpathian Ruthenia, Subcarpathian Rus', and the Ukrainian diminutive name Rusinko are amongst some of the names that reference the Rusyn-speaking population.

The oblast has various names in other languages, including:

- Hungarian: Kárpátalja (transl. hu – transl. Base of the Carpathians)
- Slovak: Zakarpatská oblasť; Podkarpatská Rus
- Czech: Zakarpatská oblast; Podkarpatská Rus
- Polish: Obwód zakarpacki
- Romanian: Regiunea Transcarpatia ([red͡ʒiˈune̯a transkarˈpat͡i.a])
- Russian: Закарпатская область (translit. Zakarpatskaya oblast)
- Ukrainian: Закарпатська область (translit. Zakarpatska oblast)
- Rusyn: Закарпатська область
- English: Subcarpathia, Subcarpathian Rus', Subcarpathian Ruthenia, Sub-Carpathian Ukraine
- French: Ukraine Subcarpathique
- German: Karpatenland, Karpathenland, Karpatenukraine, Karpato-Ukraine

While the name Transcarpathia is a translation of the Ukrainian version of the name, the Hungarian name translates as Subcarpathia, in line with the names of other Hungarian regions such as Alpokalja, a sub-Alpine territory in western Hungary. The Transcarpathia name and its variants instead reflect the East Slavic language practice of emphasizing the area's location "past" or "beyond" the Carpathians (as opposed to "below"). Western European languages have variously translated from the Hungarian or East Slavic language versions of the name, with the English and French names generally deriving from the Hungarian Subcarpathia.

== History ==
=== Early history ===
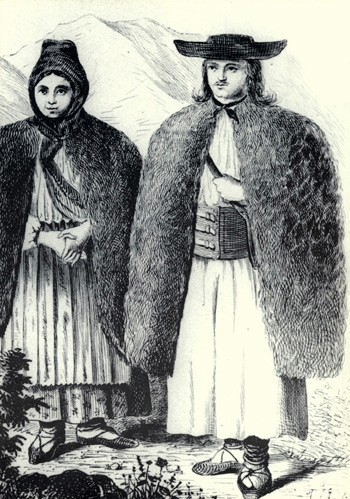
Carpathian highlanders

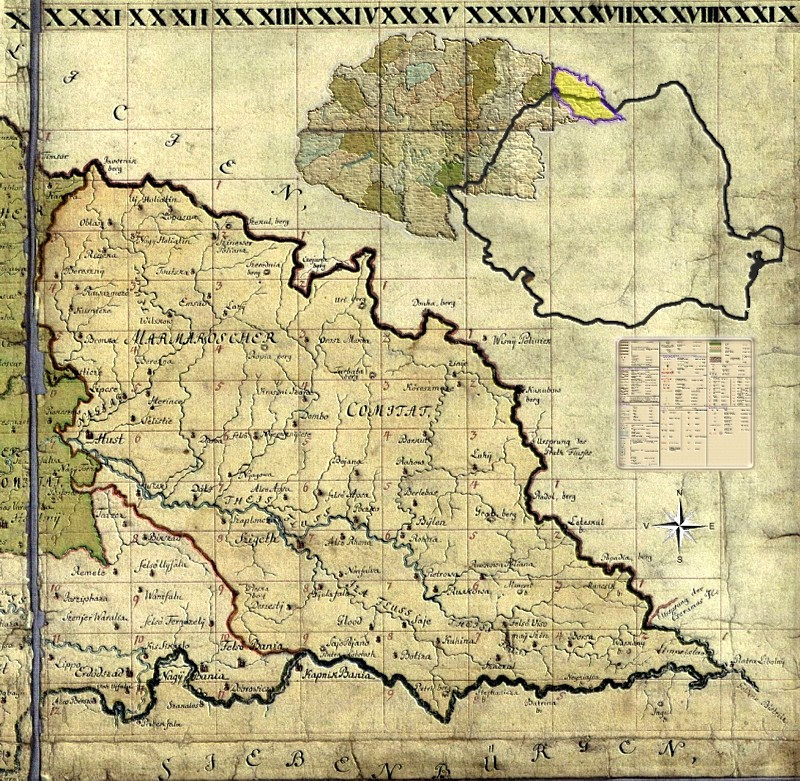
The County of Maramures in the Kingdom of Hungary overlaid with the current states of Ukraine and Romania

According to the Chronicon Pictum, the earliest state established in Zakarpattia was Ungvari in 677 AD. The name Ungvar derives from a migration of the Onogurs of Poltava, who were ruled by the northern Kubiar sons of Kubrat. The Onogur tribes entered Etelköz through the Verecke Pass. Some of Ungvari's Kubiars under Khan-Tuvan eventually joined the Rus' to form the Rus' Khaganate. In the late 9th century, Ungvari's ruling Árpád dynasty began to fulfil their ambitions for the Carpathian basin, where, by 895, they had relocated to rule over the Magyars.

According to the Gesta Hungarorum, as Prince Álmos entered on the castle of Hung and there he appointed his son Árpád as the primary ruler, hence he was called of the leader of Hungvária, while all of his valiant soldiers were known as Hungvárus, so since then all the Magyars have been known by this name internationally.

In 895, the Hungarian tribes entered the Carpathian Basin from here through the Verecke pass, and the lands of Transcarpathia were influenced by the Principality of Hungary since 895, which transformed the Kingdom of Hungary in 1000. In Transcarpathia, the Voivodeship of Maramureș, granted to a small Romanian nobility, was established in 1343. The region was reorganized into the Máramaros County in 1402.

Since 1867, it was part of the Hungarian side of Austria-Hungary until the latter's demise at the end of World War I. It approximately consisted of four Hungarian counties (comitatus): Bereg, Ung, Ugocsa, and Maramaros. This region was briefly part of the short-lived West Ukrainian National Republic in 1918. The region was occupied by Romania by the end of that year, mostly the eastern portion, such as Rakhiv and Khust. It was later recaptured by the Hungarian Soviet Republic in the summer of 1919. Finally, after the Treaty of Trianon of 1920, it became part of Czechoslovakia with a supposedly equal level of autonomy as the Slovak lands and Bohemia-Moravia-Czech Silesia (Czech lands).

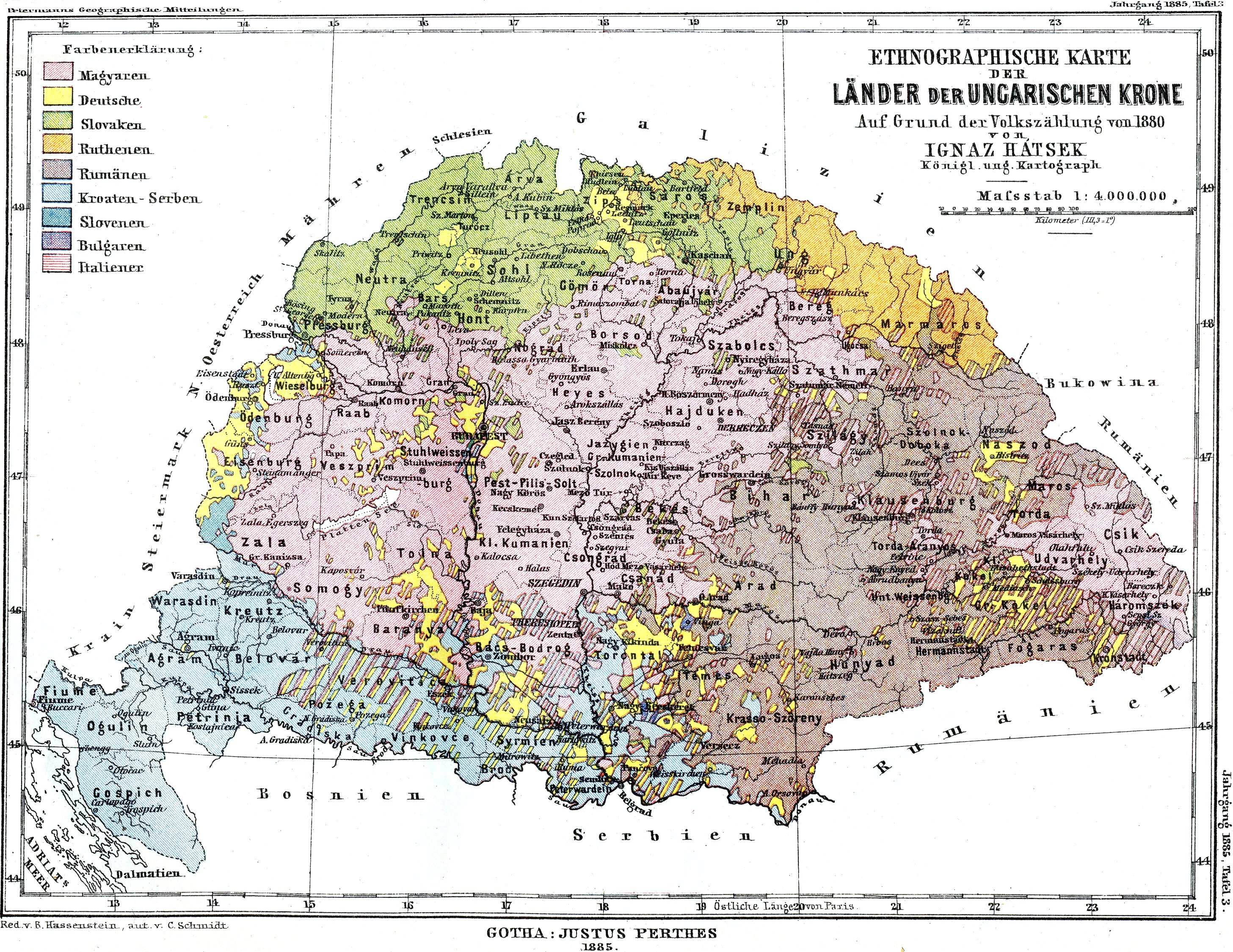
The 1885 ethnographic map of the Kingdom of Hungary, based on the 1880 census, with Ruthenians identified in orange (northeastern, upper-right-hand corner)

The province has a unique footnote in history as the only region in the former Czechoslovakia to have had an American governor: its first governor was Gregory Zhatkovich, an American citizen who had earlier emigrated from the region and represented the Rusyn community in the U.S. Zhatkovich was appointed governor by Czechoslovakia's first president, T. G. Masaryk in 1920, and served for about one year until he resigned over differences regarding the region's autonomy. In 1928, it adopted the name of Subcarpathian Rus' (Czech: Podkarpatská Rus). Nevertheless, such autonomy was granted as late as in 1938, after detrimental events of the Munich Conference; until then, this land was administered directly from Prague by the government-appointed provincial presidents (zemští prezidenti) and/or elected governors (guvernéři).

Following the Munich Agreement, the southern part of the region was awarded to Hungary under the First Vienna Award in 1938. The remaining portion was constituted as an autonomous region of the short-lived Second Czechoslovak Republic.

=== World War II ===
After the Slovak declaration of an independent state on 14 March, the next day, Carpatho-Ukraine was proclaimed as an independent republic but was immediately occupied and annexed by Hungary, and the Protectorate of Bohemia and Moravia was proclaimed a day after. Voloshyn asked Hitler for support and recognition in advance, but received no answer. The state is known as 'the one-day republic' because it did not exist more than one day. The military operations and the occupation of Carpatho-Ukraine were finished by the Hungarian troops on March 18.

The Hungarian invasion was followed by a few weeks of terror in which more than 27,000 people were shot dead without trial or investigation. Over 75,000 Ukrainians decided to seek asylum in the Soviet Union; of those, almost 60,000 died in Gulag prison camps. Others joined the Czechoslovak Army.

Map of Carpatho-Ukraine, an entity that lasted only one day (March 15, 1939)

The major Jewish communities of the region had existed in Mukachevo, Ungvar, and Khust. During the German occupation of Hungary (March–December 1944), almost the entire Jewish population was deported; few survived the Holocaust.

In October 1944, the region was occupied by the Red Army. On 26 November 1944, the First Congress of People's Committees of Zakarpattia Ukraine took place in Mukachevo, and sham elections were organized on 10–25 November 1944. On 29 June 1945, Czechoslovak President Edvard Beneš, seeking to postpone the inevitable incorporation of Czechoslovakia into the Soviet Bloc, signed a treaty formally ceding the area to the Soviet Union, and the next month it was united with the Ukrainian SSR through the "Manifest for unification with Soviet Ukraine" that was accepted by the 1st Congress of People's Committees of Sub-Carpathian Ukraine without any knowledge or approval of the common people. It was then annexed into the Soviet Union as Zakarpattia Oblast.

=== In the Soviet Union ===
Between 1945 and 1947, the new Soviet authorities fortified the new borders and, in July 1947, declared Transcarpathia as "a restricted zone of the highest level", with checkpoints on the mountain passes connecting the region to mainland Ukraine.

In December 1944, the National Council of Transcarpatho-Ukraine set up a special people's tribunal in Uzhgorod to try and condemn all collaborationists with the previous governments, both Hungary and Carpatho-Ukraine. The court was allowed to hand down either 10 years of forced labour or the death penalty. Several Ruthenian leaders, including Andrej Bródy and Štefan Fencik, were condemned and executed in May 1946. Avgustyn Voloshyn also died in prison. The extent of the repression showed to many Carpatho-Ruthenian activists that it was not possible to find an accommodation with the coming Soviet regime, as it had been with all previous ones.

After breaking the Greek Catholic Church in Eastern Galicia in 1946, Soviet authorities pushed for the return to Orthodoxy of Greek-Catholic parishes in Transcarpathia too, including by engineering the accident and death of recalcitrant bishop Theodore Romzha on 1 November 1947. In January 1949, the Greek Catholic Eparchy of Mukachevo was declared illegal; remaining priests and nuns were arrested, and church properties were nationalised and parcelled for public use or lent to the Russian Orthodox Church (Moscow Patriarchate) as the only accepted religious authority in the region.

Cultural institutions were also forbidden, including the Russophile Dukhnovych Society, the Ukrainophile Prosvita, and the Subcarpathian Scholarly Society. New books and publications were circulated, including the Zakarpatsk'a Pravda (130,000 copies). The Uzhhorod National University was opened in 1945. Over 816 cinemas were open by 1967 to ensure the indoctrination of the population with Marxist-Leninist propaganda. The Ukrainian language was the first language of instruction in schools throughout the region, followed by Russian, which was extensively used at the university level. Most new generations had a passive knowledge of the Rusyn language, but no knowledge about local culture. XIX-century Rusyn intellectuals were labelled as "members of the reactionary class and instruments of Vatican obscurantism." The Rusyn anthem and hymn were banned from public performance. Carpatho-Rusyn folk culture and songs, which were promoted, were presented as part of Transcarpathian regional culture as a local variant of Ukrainian culture.

As early as 1924, the Comintern had declared all East Slavic inhabitants of Czechoslovakia (Rusyns, Carpatho-Russians, Rusnaks) to be Ukrainians. As of the 1946 census, all Rusyns were recorded as Ukrainians; anyone clinging to the old label was considered a separatist and a potential counter-revolutionary.

Already in February 1945, the National Council proceeded to confiscate 53,000 hectares of land from big landowners and redistribute it to 54,000 peasant households (37% of the population). Forced collectivisation of land started in 1946; around 2,000 peasants were arrested during protests in 1948–49 and sent for forced labour in the Gulag. Collectivisation, including of mountain shepherds, was completed by May 1950. Central planning decisions set Transcarpathia to become a "land of orchards and vineyards" between 1955 and 1965, planting 98,000 hectares with little result. Attempts to cultivate tea and citrus also failed due to the climate. Most vineyards were uprooted twenty years later, during Mikhail Gorbachev's anti-alcohol campaign in 1985–87.

The Soviet period also meant the upscaling of industrialisation in Transcarpathia. State-owned lumber mills, chemical and food-processing plants widened, with Mukachevo's tobacco factory and Solotvyno's salt works as the biggest ones, providing steady employment to the residents of the region, beyond the traditional subsistence agriculture. And while traditional labour migration routes to the fields of Hungary or the factories of the North-West United States were now closed, Carpathian Ruthens and Romanians could now move for seasonal work in Russia's North and East.

The inhabitants of the oblast grew steadily in the Soviet period, from 776,000 in 1946 to over 1,2 million in 1989. Uzhgorod increased its residents fivefold, from 26,000 to 117,000, and Mukachevo likewise from 26,600 to 84,000. This population increase also reflected demographic changes. The arrival of the Red Army meant the departure of 5,100 Magyars and 2,500 Germans, while the 15–20,000 Jewish survivors of the Holocaust also decided to move out before the borders were sealed. By 1945, around 30,000 Hungarians and Germans had been interned and sent to labour camps in Eastern Ukraine and Siberia; while amnestied in 1955, around 5,000 did not come back. In January 1946, 2,000 more Germans were deported. In return, a large number of Ukrainians and Russians moved to Transcarpathia, where they found jobs in the industry, the military, or the civilian administration. By 1989, around 170,000 Ukrainians (mainly from nearby Galizia) and 49,000 Russians were living in Transcarpathia, mainly in new residential blocks in the main towns of Uzhgorod and Mukachevo, where the dominant language had soon turned from Hungarian and Yiddish to Russian. They kept being considered newcomers (novoprybuli) due to their disconnect from the Rusyn- and Hungarian-speaking countryside.

=== In independent Ukraine ===
After the fall of the Soviet Union in 1991, Ukraine held an independence referendum in which the residents of Zakarpattia were asked about the Zakarpattia Oblast Council's proposal for self-rule. About 78% of the oblast's population voted in favour of autonomy; however, it was not granted.

At the first Presidential elections in Ukraine in 1991, voters from Transcarpathia supported Leonid Kravchuk by 58%. At the 1994 Ukrainian parliamentary election, Transcarpathia elected 9 independent MPs over 11 to the Rada. The same year, voters in the region supported the incumbent Leonid Kravchuk over Leonid Kuchma by 70.5% At the 1998 Ukrainian parliamentary election, Transcarpathia turned out to be one of the strongholds (together with Kyiv and L'viv) of Viktor Medvedchuk's Social Democratic Party of Ukraine (united), which back then ran on a moderate Ukrainian nationalist ideology. One year later, at the Presidential elections, Transcarpathian voters supported the re-election of Leonid Kuchma by 85%.

At the 2002 Ukrainian parliamentary election, voters from Transcapathia supported the Our Ukraine Bloc, in line with voters from all Western Ukraine. At the 2004 Ukrainian presidential election, Transcarpathians voted in the majority for Viktor Yushchenko. At the 2006 Ukrainian parliamentary election, voters from Transcapathia supported the Our Ukraine Bloc and the Yulia Tymoshenko Bloc, in line with voters in Ciscarpatian East Galizia. At the 2007 Ukrainian parliamentary election, the Our Ukraine–People's Self-Defense Bloc linked to former President Viktor Yushchenko, won in most of the region, while the Yulia Tymoshenko Bloc came out first in Uzhhorod and its raion.

On 7 March 2007, the Zakarpattia Oblast Council recognized the Rusyn ethnicity.

On October 25, 2008, 100 delegates to the Congress of Carpathian Ruthenians declared the formation of the "Republic of Carpathian Ruthenia". The prosecutor's office of Zakarpattia region filed a case against priest Dymytrii Sydor and Yevhen Zhupan (members of the Ukrainian Orthodox Church (Moscow Patriarchate) in Ukraine and in close relations with the Russkiy Mir Foundation), an Our Ukraine deputy of the Zakarpattia regional council and chairman of the People's Council of Ruthenians, on charges of encroaching on the territorial integrity and inviolability of Ukraine. On May 1, 2009, National Union Svoboda blocked the holding of the third European congress of the Carpathian Ruthenians, a pro-Russian entity.

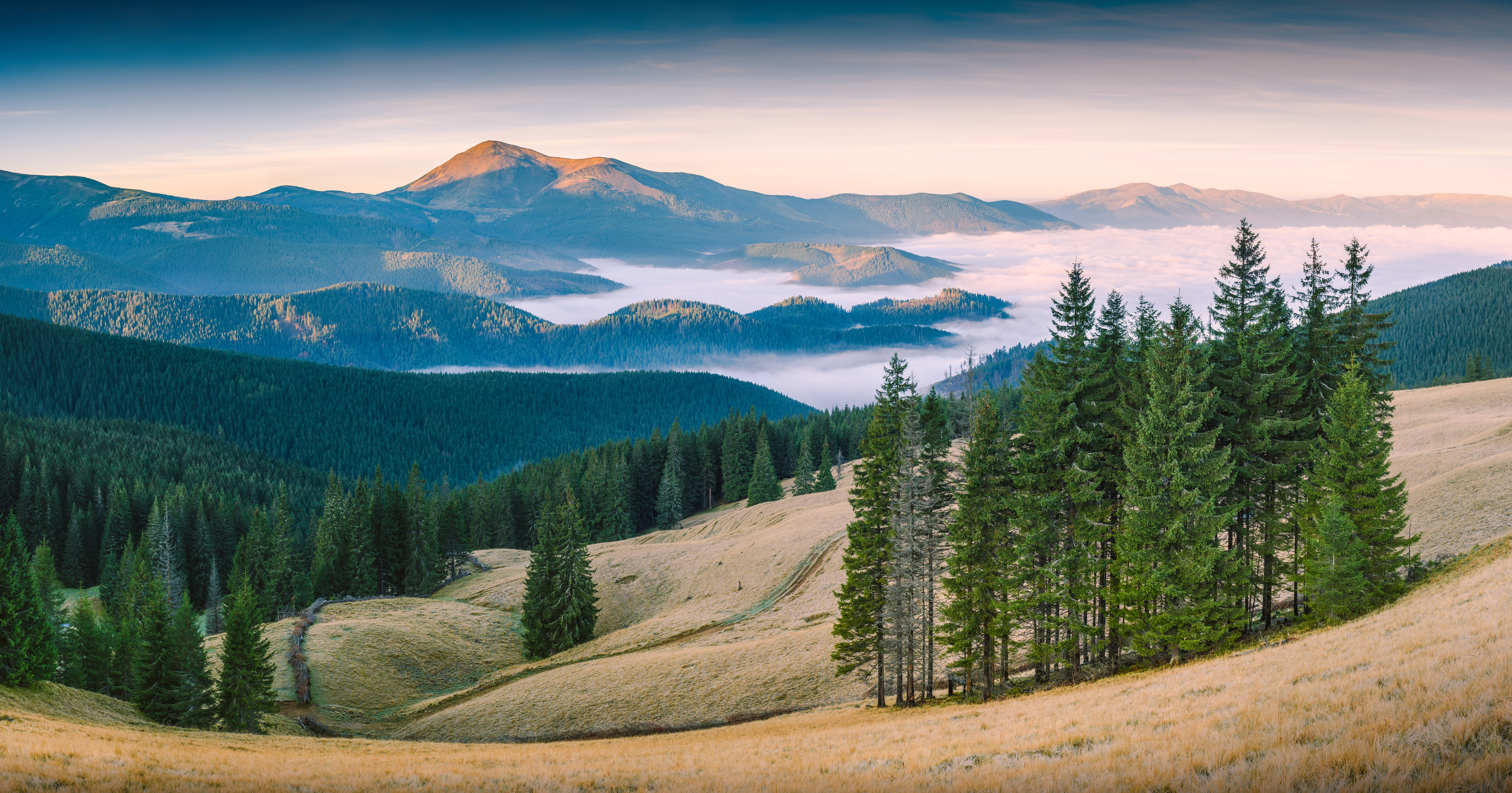
The Carpathian Biosphere Reserve became part of the World Network of Biosphere Reserves of UNESCO in 1992.

At the 2010 Ukrainian presidential election, Yulia Tymoshenko won in most raions of Transcarpathia save for Mukachevo, Berehove, and Vynohradiv, where Viktor Yanukovych gained a majority.

In the 2010 and 2015 local elections, the United Centre won majorities in Transcarpathia. The 2012 Ukrainian parliamentary election saw both the United Centre and the Party of Regions win districts in Transcarpathia.

In the 2014 presidential election, Transcarpathia helped elect Petro Poroshenko as president of Ukraine. Turnout in the east of the region was among the lowest in Ukraine, below 40%, while it reached 65% in its west. At the 2014 Ukrainian parliamentary election, electoral results in Transcarpathia saw districts being won by Arseniy Yatsenyuk's People's Front and by the Petro Poroshenko Bloc.

Ukraine's 2017 education law makes Ukrainian the required language of study in state schools. Since 2017, relations between Ukraine and Hungary have rapidly deteriorated over the issue of the Hungarian minority in Ukraine.

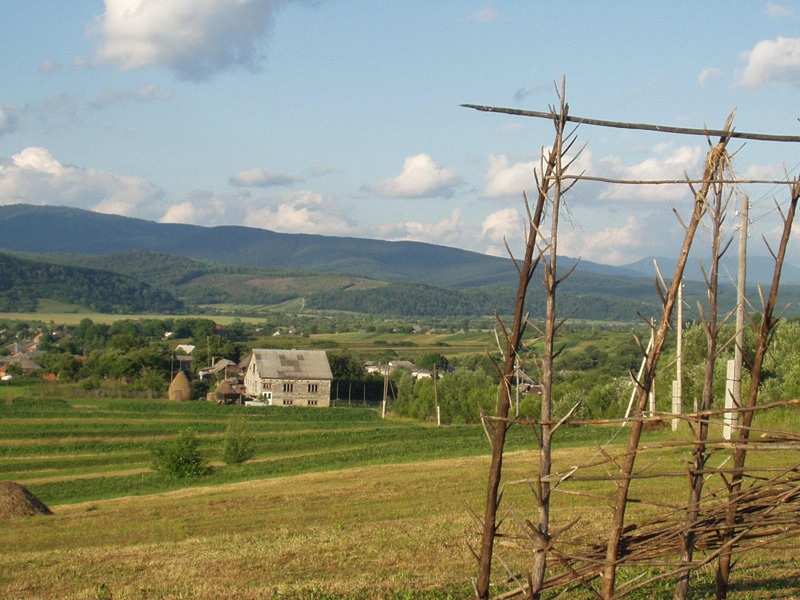
Scenic view of Turja Pasika village, north of Mukachevo

Transcaparthian voters overwhelmingly supported Volodymyr Zelenskyy at the 2019 Ukrainian presidential election.

At the 2019 Ukrainian parliamentary election, President Zelenskyy's Servant of the People party won a plurality in Transcarpathia. Electoral turnout in the region was the lowest in the country (<42.5%)

After the 2022 Russian invasion of Ukraine, Hungary, led by the government of pro-Russian Prime Minister Viktor Orban, attempted to destabilize the region on multiple occasions. Orban's government has been actively trying to hinder Ukraine's defences against Russian military aggression, including establishing an espionage network in Zakarpattia and conducting several false-flag attacks on members of the Hungarian minority and their properties, with the attempt to damage Ukraine's reputation on the international level and falsely accuse Zelenskyy's government of stirring up anti-Hungarian sentiments. Ukraine's security and intelligence services revealed that the Hungarian government-sponsored network of spies and saboteurs has been working in close coordination with the Russian intelligence apparatus.

The 2022 Russian invasion of Ukraine revived interest among Hungarian nationalists for annexing Zakarpattia.

On 27 January 2024 Hungarian László Toroczkai said at a conference that his party Mi Hazánk Mozgalom would lay claim to Zakarpattia/Transcarpathia if the Ukraine-Russia war led to Ukraine losing its statehood.

== Geography ==
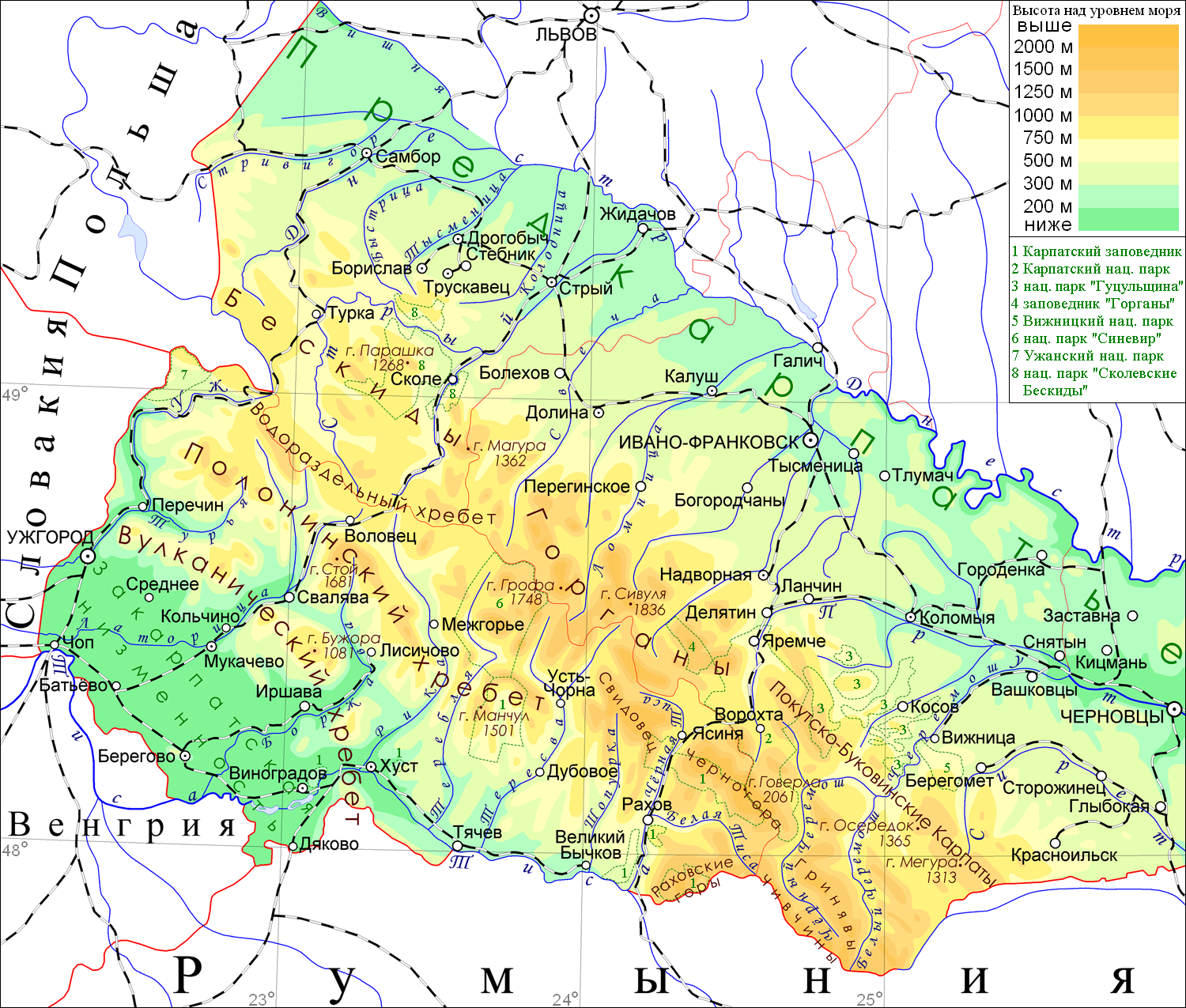
Ukrainian Carpathians, dividing Zakarpattia (on the south-western side) from Prykarpattia (on the north-eastern side)

The Zakarpattia Oblast has a total area of 12,800 km^{2} (4,942 sq mi) and is located on southwestern slopes and foothills of the Carpathian Mountains covering around 80% of area in the region. The rest of the region is covered by the Transcarpathian Lowland which is part of the Pannonian plain. Zakarpattia is the only Ukrainian oblast to have boundaries with four countries: Poland, Slovakia, Hungary and Romania. On the West it borders the Prešov and Košice Regions of Slovakia and Borsod-Abaúj-Zemplén and Szabolcs-Szatmár-Bereg Counties of Hungary, on the South—the Satu Mare and Maramureș Counties of Romania, on the East and Northeast—Ivano-Frankivsk Oblast, and on the North—Lviv Oblast and the Subcarpathian Voivodeship of Poland.

The Zakarpattia Oblast mostly consists of mountains and small hills covered with deciduous and coniferous forests, as well as alpine meadows. Mountains cover about 80% of the oblast's area, and cross from North-West to South-East. The Primeval Beech Forests of the Carpathians, part of which are located within Zakarpattia Oblast, were recognized as a UNESCO World Heritage Site in 2007.

The largest rivers that flow through the oblast include the Tysa, Borzhava, and the Tereblia. A high altitude lake is located in Rakhiv Raion, which is the highest in the region. It is called Nesamovyte. The lake is located in the Hoverla preserve on the slopes of Turkul mountain. The lake's area is 3,000 square metres (32,000 sq ft) and it is located 1,750 metres (5,740 ft) above sea level.

The region's climate is moderate and continental with about 700–1,000 mm (28–39 in) of rainfall per year. The average temperature in summer is +21 °С (70 °F) and −4 °С (25 °F) in winter. With an elevation of 2,061 metres (6,762 ft) above sea level, Hoverla, part of the Chornohora mountain range, is the highest point in the oblast. The lowest point, 101 m (331 ft) above sea level, is located in the village of Ruski Heyevtsi (Oroszgejőc in Hungarian) in the Uzhhorodskyi Raion.

Four of the oblast's historical-cultural sites were nominated for the Seven Wonders of Ukraine competition in 2007: Palanok Castle, Museum upon the Chorna River, Mykhailiv Orthodox Church, and the Nevytsky Castle.

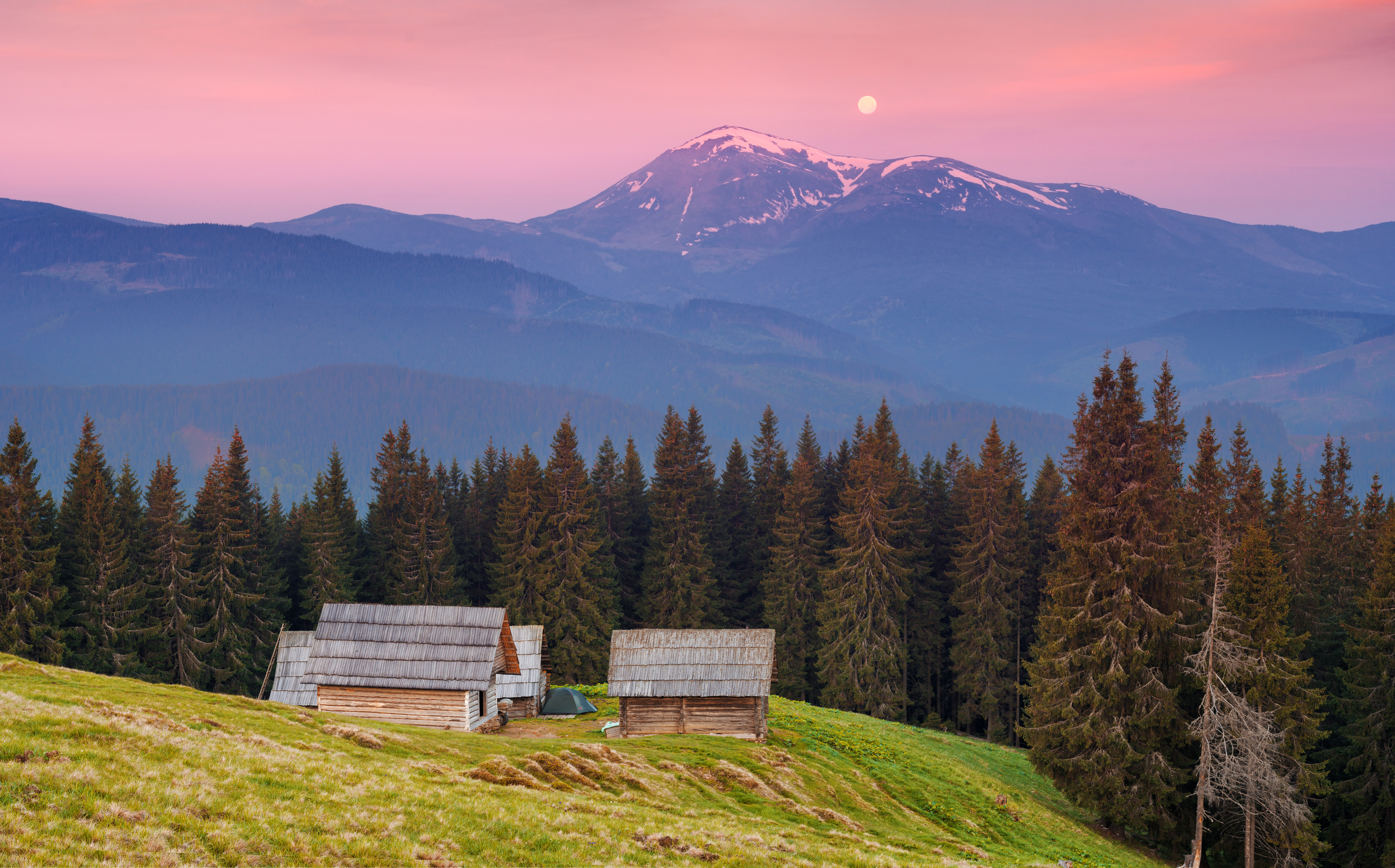
Morning in the Carpathian Biosphere Reserve

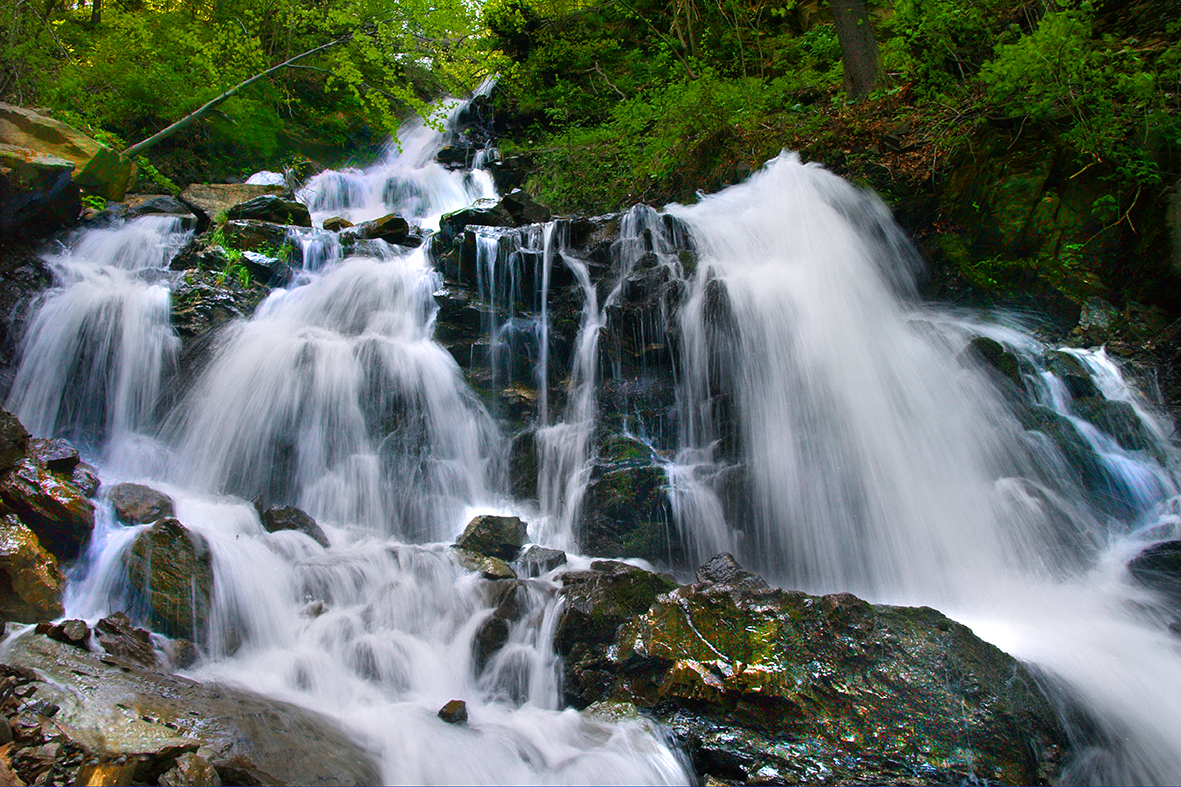
Svydovets (Drahobrat) Waterfall

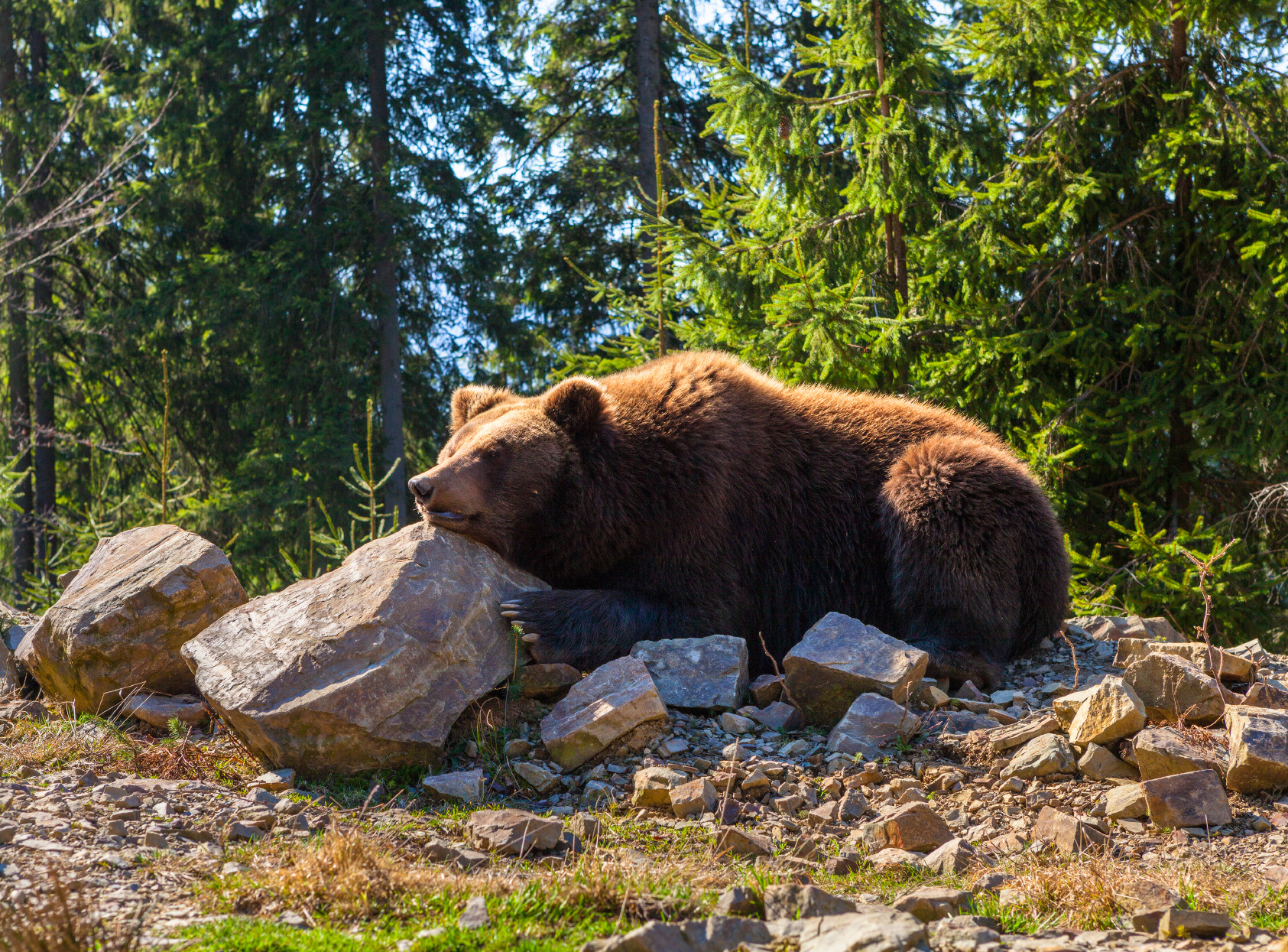
A bear in Synevyr National Nature Park

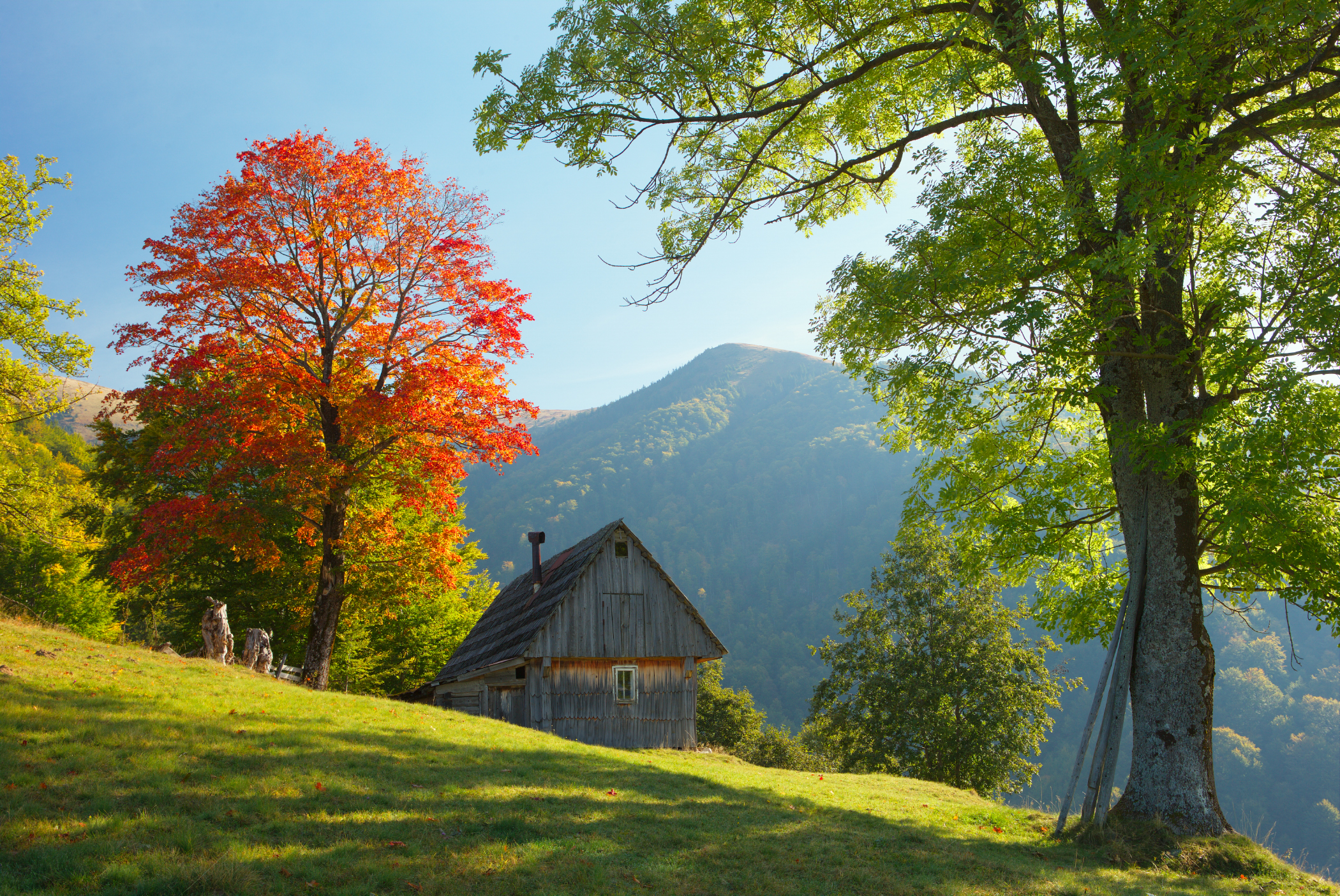
Landscape in Khust Raion

== Demographics ==
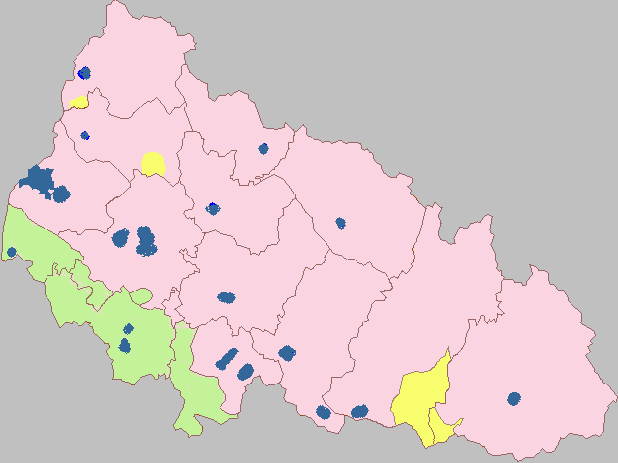
Ethnic map of Zakarpattia Oblast in 2001. Ukrainians (incl. Rusyns) Hungarians Romanians mixed Ukrainians (incl. Rusyns) Note: The Roma are not represented in the map.

Historical population
Year	Pop.	±%
1970	1,056,799	—
1979	1,154,417	+9.2%
1989	1,252,288	+8.5%
2001	1,258,264	+0.5%
2011	1,247,350	−0.9%
2022	1,244,476	−0.2%

According to the 2001 Ukrainian Census, the population of Zakarpattia Oblast is 1,254,614. The current estimated population is 1,259,158 (2016 est.). With the comparison of the last official Soviet Census of 1989 the total population grew by 0.7%.

The Ukrainian state does not recognise ethnic Rusyns as a separate nationality, instead categorizing them as a subgroup of Ukrainians. Rusyns and the Rusyn language are thus included in the category of Ukrainians and Ukrainian language group are in the majority (72.5%), other ethnic groups are relatively numerous in Zakarpattia. The largest of these are Hungarians (20.1%), Romanians (2.6%), Russians (2.5%), Roma (1.1%), Slovaks (0.5%) and Germans (0.3%). Most Romanians in Ukraine live in Northern Maramureș, but there is also a small Romanian community living outside of this region, referred to in Romanian as volohi. The Ukrainian government does not recognize the Rusyn people living in that country as a distinct nationality but rather as an ethnic sub-group of Ukrainians. About 10,100 people (0.8%) identify themselves as Rusyns according to the last census.

Out of 1,010,100 Ukrainians in the region, 99.2% (~1,002,019) identified their native language as Ukrainian, while about 0.5% (~5,051) consider their native language to be Russian. Out of 151,500 Hungarians, 97.1% (~147,107) consider their native language to be Hungarian, while about 2.6% (~3,939) consider their native language to be Ukrainian. Out of the 32,100 officially recorded Romanians, 99.1% (31,811) identified their native language to be Romanian, while 0.6% (~193) consider their language Ukrainian. Out of 31,000 Russians, 91.6% (28,396) identified their native language as Russian, while 8.1% (~2,511) consider their language Ukrainian. Out of 14,000 Romani peoples only 20.7% (2,898) identify their native language as Romani, while 62.9% (~8,806) consider their language Ukrainian or Russian. Out of 5,600 Slovaks 43.9% (2,458) identify their native language as Slovak, while 42.1% (~2,358) consider their language Ukrainian. Out of 3,500 Germans, 50.0% (1,750) acknowledge their native language, while 38.9% (~1,362) consider their language Ukrainian. About 81% of the oblast population considers the Ukrainian language their native language, while 12.7% of population gives consideration to the Hungarian language and just over 5% considers either the Russian or Romanian languages.

Around two thirds are Eastern Orthodox and about a quarter are Catholic. The largest denomination is the Ukrainian Orthodox Church, followed by the Ruthenian Greek Catholic Church. Smaller religious groups include Roman Catholics and Protestants, which are largely associated with minority groups; Roman Catholics and Protestants tend to be Hungarian or Rusyn.

Nationality	Number	in 1989 (%)	in 2001 (%)	growth (%)
Ukrainians (incl. Rusyns)	1,010,100	78.4	80.5	+3.4%
Hungarians	151,500	12.5	15.1	+2.7%
Romanians	32,100	2.4	2.6	+9.0%
Russians	31,000	4.0	2.5	-37.3%
Roma	14,000	1.0	1.1	+15.4%
Slovaks	5,600	0.6	0.5	-22.3%
Germans	3,500	0.3	0.3	+3.0%

Year	Fertility	Birth	Year	Fertility	Birth	Year	Fertility	Birth
1990	2,2	21 251	2000	1,5	14 481	2010	1,9	18 301
1991	2,2	21 059	2001	1,4	13 699	2011	1,9	18 460
1992	2,2	20 559	2002	1,5	14 207			
1993	2,0	19 264	2003	1,5	14 747			
1994	1,9	17 725	2004	1,5	15 472			
1995	1,8	17 320	2005	1,6	15 750			
1996	1,7	16 473	2006	1,7	16 530			
1997	1,6	15 708	2007	1,7	16 833			

Their languages and culture are respected by the provision of education, clubs, etc. in their respective languages. Those who recognize Ukrainian as their native language total 81.0% of the population, Hungarian — 12.7%, Russian — 2.9%, Romanian — 2.6%, and Rusyn — 0.5% Residents in seven of Mukachivskyi Raion's villages have the option to learn the Hungarian language in a school or home school environment. The first Hungarian College in Ukraine is in Berehove, the II. Rákoczi Ferenc College.

Zakarpattia is home to approximately 14,000 ethnic Roma (Gypsies), the highest proportion of Roma in any oblast in Ukraine.

Beside the major ethnic groups, Zakarpattia is home to several ethnic sub-groups such as Boykos, Lemky, Hutsuls, and others.

=== Religion ===
Religion in Zakarpattia Oblast (2021)
1. Greek Catholic (26.0%)
2. Roman Catholicism (5.00%)
3. Reformed Church (7.00%)
4. Other Protestants (13.0%)
5. Ukrainian Orthodox Church (36.0%)
6. Orthodox Church of Ukraine (4.00%)
7. Other (9.00%)

According to a 2021 survey, 31% of the religious community of Zakarpattia Oblast adheres to Catholicism, while 40% belong to the Eastern Orthodoxy and 20% are Protestants. Only one percent of the population does not follow any religion.

The Catholic community of Zakarpattia is divided as follows:

- Roman Catholic – 17%
- Greek Catholic – 83%

The Greek Catholic community falls under the Greek Catholic Eparchy of Mukachevo, associated with the Ruthenian Greek Catholic Church.

The Orthodox community of Zakarpattia is divided as follows:

- Ukrainian Orthodox Church of the Kyivan Patriarchate (today Orthodox Church of Ukraine) – 42%
- Ukrainian Orthodox Church of the Moscow Patriarchate – 33%
- Non-denominational – 25%

The Sub-Carpathian Reformed Church is considered to be the oldest Protestant community in Ukraine (the first group of Reformers appeared in Sub-Carpathia in the 1530s) and the only church of the Calvinist tradition.

=== Age structure ===
0–14 years: 19.1% ▲ (male 123,009/female 116,213)
15–64 years: 69.8% ▼ (male 428,295/female 445,417)
65 years and over: 11.1% ▲ (male 48,826/female 89,800) (2013 official)

=== Median age ===
total: 35.1 years ▲
male: 33.2 years ▲
female: 37.1 years ▲ (2013 official)

== Economy ==
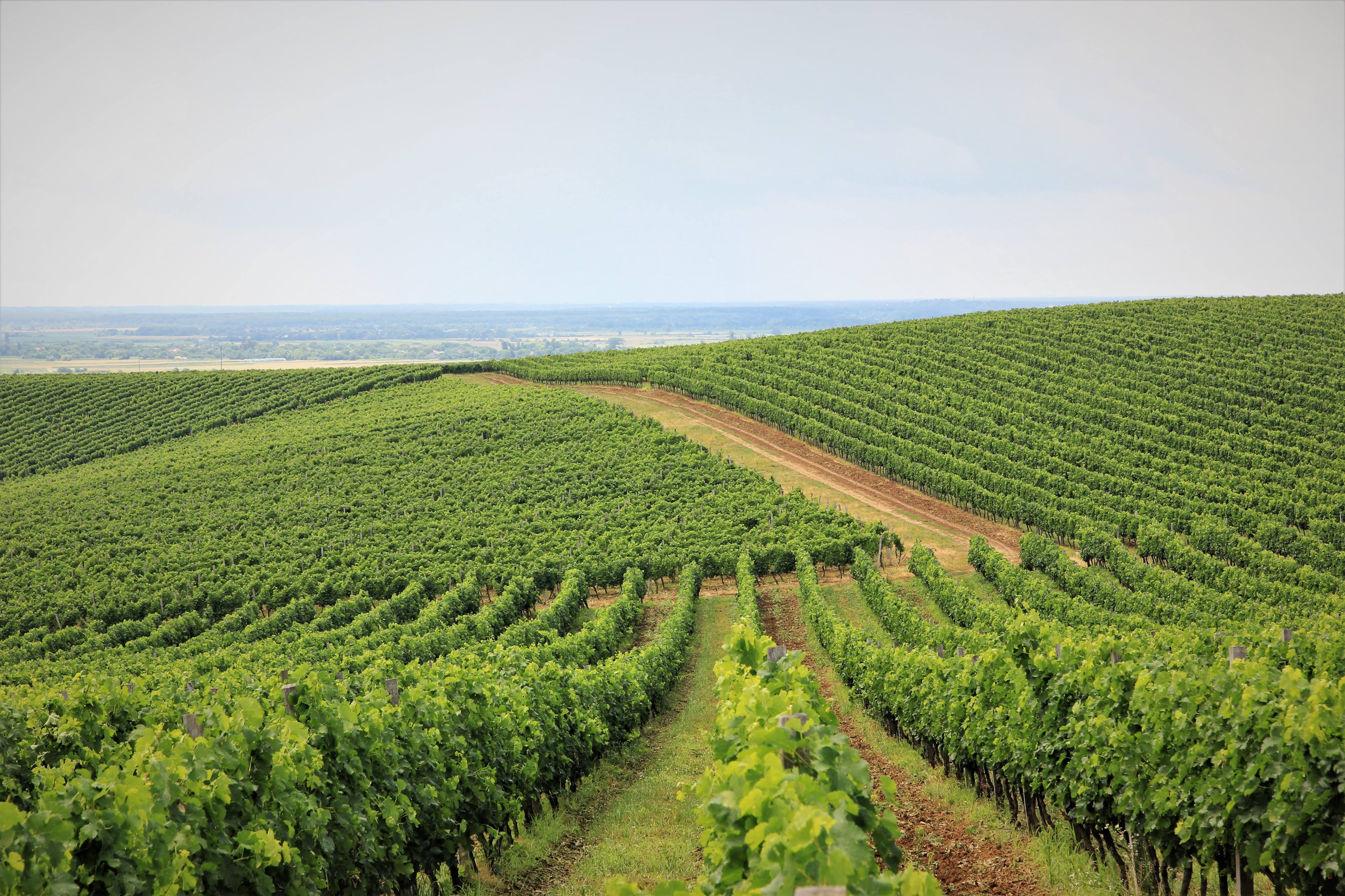
Vineyards near Muzhiievo Village. Four major Ukrainian wineries are located in Zakarpattia Oblast

Situated in the Carpathian Mountains, Zakarpattia Oblast's economy depends mostly on trans-border trade, vinery and forestry. The oblast is also home to a special economic zone.

The oblast's main industry includes woodworking. Other industries include food, light industry, and mechanical engineering. The foodstuffs segment in the structure of ware production of national consumption is 45%. The total number of large industrial organisations is 319, compared to 733 small industrial organisations.

The most common crops grown within the region include cereals, potatoes and other vegetables. In 1999, the total amount of grain produced was 175,800 tons, of sunflower seeds — 1,300 tons, and potatoes — 378,200 tons. The region also produced 76,100 tons of meat, 363,400 tons of milk and 241,900,000 eggs. The total amount of registered farms in the region was 1,400 in 1999.

In 2011 it had a gross regional product worth ₴18,100,000,000

== Culture ==
The oblast is known as the birthplace of many prominent Ukrainian scientists, artists and stage performers. The region is considered a major area for organizing and holding international and national scientific and artistic forums. There are four accredited state universities in the oblast as well as a number of secondary schools, including nine recently established educational institutions, intended specifically to promote the language and cultural education of national minorities. The oblast also has five professional theaters, 659 clubs and leisure centers, museums, and a regional philharmonic. The oblast is also known for its cinema. Film screenings in Transcarpathia date back to 1909, when the Hungarian scientific cinema Urania opened its branch in Uzhhorod, where popular science films were screened. At that time, Uzhhorod residents could watch movies in two places: on Lajos Kossuth Square (now Sandor Petofi Square), and, since 1911, in the Korona Hotel. Many film actors and directors came from the region, including Shari Fedak, Vyacheslav Bihun, Jack Gaffrein, Alta Vashova, Antonin Moskalyk, Ludvik Raza, Mykhailo Fitz, Anastasia Yevtushenko, Beila Shalamon, Rudolph Dzurynets, Urai Tivodar, Antonio Lukic, Yevhen Yanovich, Stephen Gerey, and Dyula Chortosh.

=== Wooden churches ===
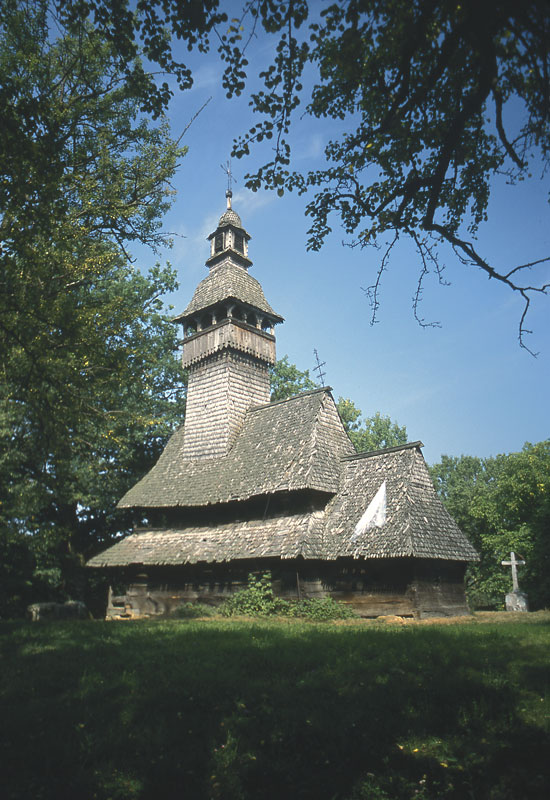
Church in Kolodne

- Serednie Vodyane churches
- Verkhnye Vodyane church
- Danylovo church
- Kolodne church
- Krainykovo church
- Nyzhnie Selyshche church
- Oleksandrivka church
- Sokyrnytsia church
- Huklyvyi church

== Politics ==
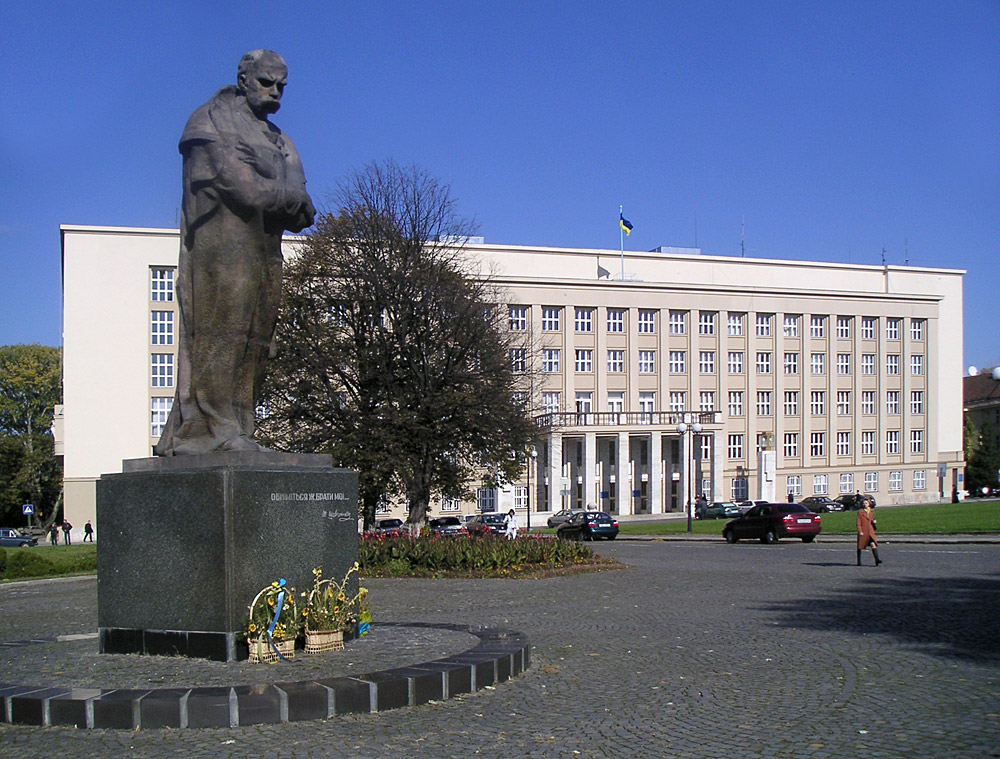
Regional government headquarters

Zakarpattia Oblast's local administration is controlled by the Zakarpattia Oblast Council (rada).

The oblast's governor is appointed by the President of Ukraine.

=== 2020 ===
Distribution of seats after the 2020 Ukrainian local elections

- 12 Native Zakarpattia
- 11 Servant of the People
- 8 Fatherland
- 8 Party of Hungarians
- 7 Andriy Baloha's Team
- 6 European Solidarity
- 6 For the Future
- 6 Opposition Platform — For Life

Election date was 25 October 2020

=== 2015 ===
Distribution of seats after the 2015 Ukrainian local elections

- 19 United Centre
- 15 Solidarity
- 11 Revival
- 8 Party of Hungarians
- 7 Fatherland
- 4 Opposition Bloc

Election date was 25 October 2015

== Administrative divisions ==
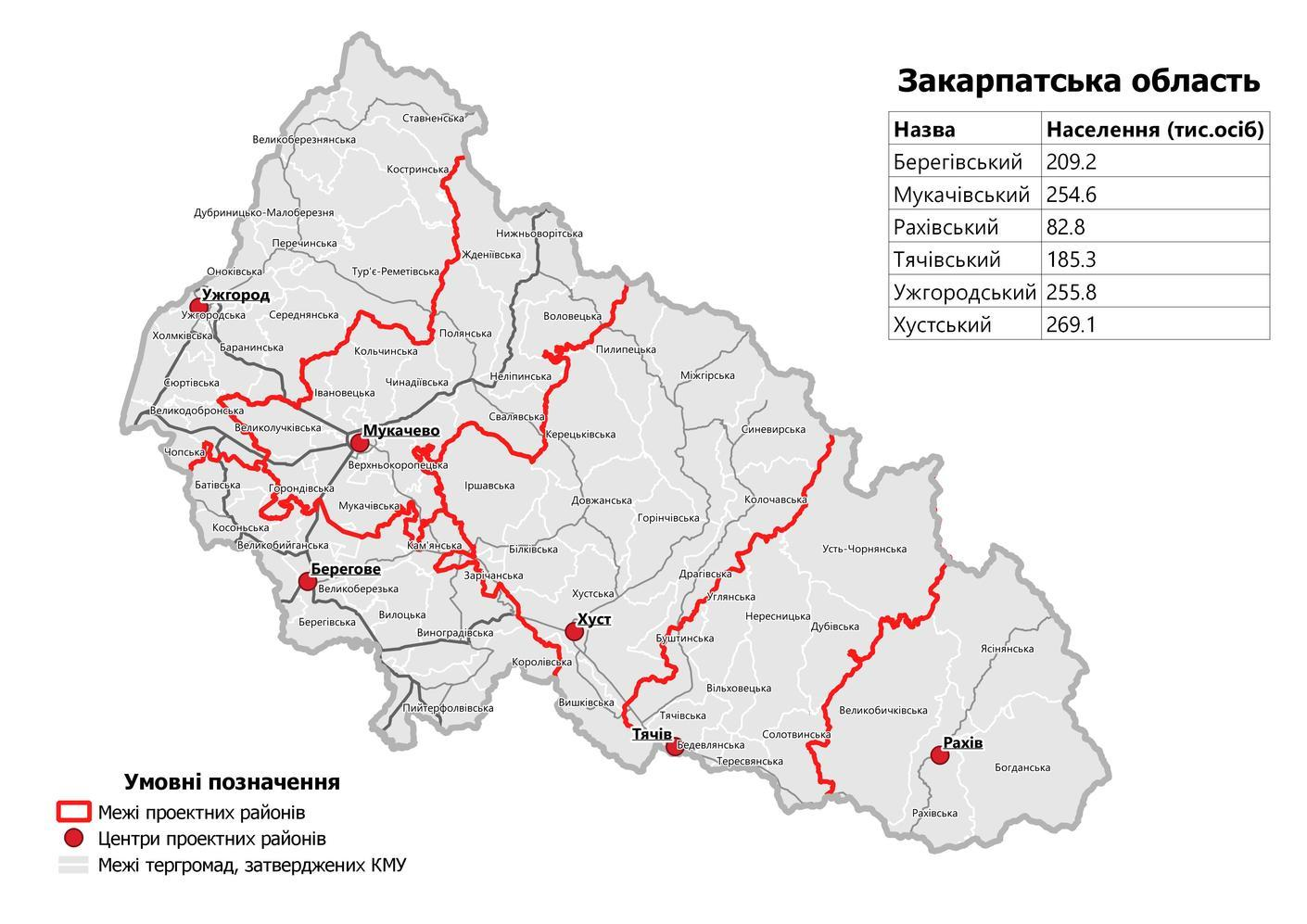
Raions of Zakarpattia Oblast as of August 2020.

Raions and cities of Zakarpattia Oblast before 2020.

Historical regions in Zakarpattia Oblast: Ung Bereg / Ugocsa Northern Maramureș

On 18 July 2020, the number of raions (districts) was reduced to six.

Zakarpattia Oblast was previously subdivided into 13 raions (districts), as well as 5 cities (municipalities) which are directly subordinate to the oblast government: Berehove (Beregszász), Chop (Csap), Khust, Mukachevo, and the administrative centre of the oblast, Uzhhorod. There are a total of 11 cities, 19 towns, and more than 579 villages.

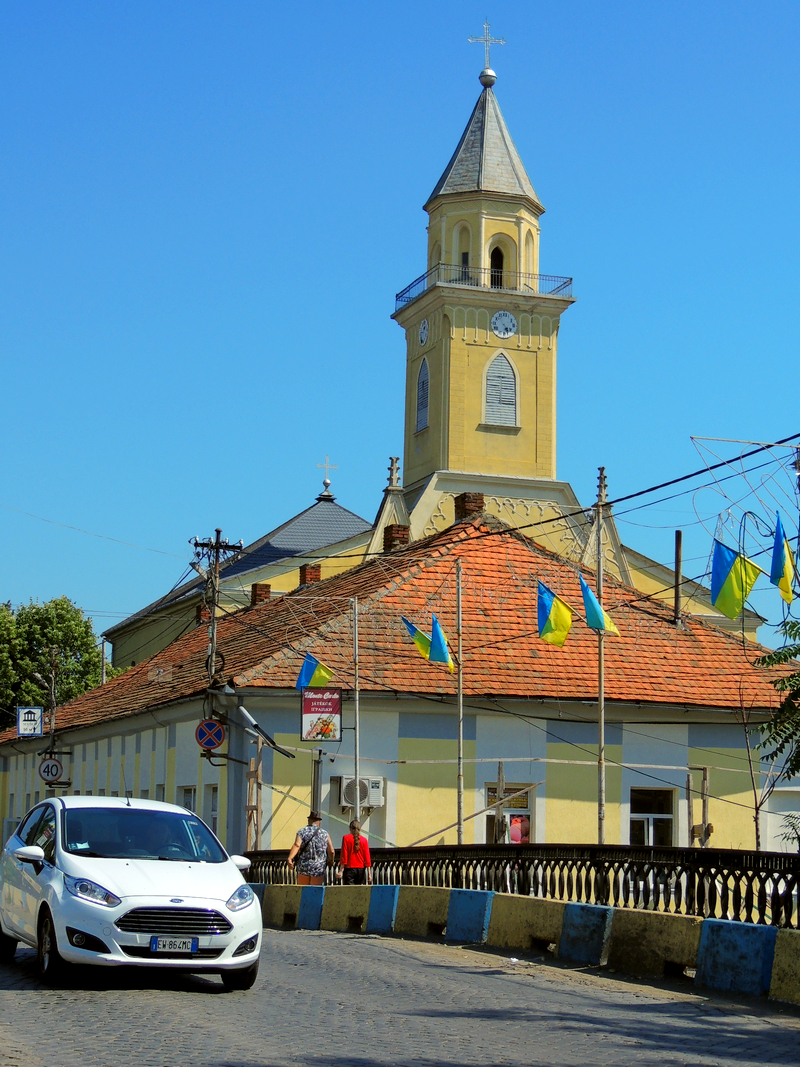
Berehove

Zakarpattia Oblast incorporates four unofficial geographic-historic regions (counties): Ung, Bereg, Ugocsa and Northern Maramureș. There is a project for a reform of the current administrative division of the Oblast

Administrative centres of raions may be located within a city of regional importance, while such city is not technically a part of the raion.

Each raion is subdivided into radas (councils). Cities and towns (urban-type settlements) all have own individual councils, while villages and rural settlements may be formed into multiple settlements councils or an individual village council. A city of regional significance may consist of an individual populated place or be complex of several settlements (the city proper and suburbs) which are governed by their own rada (council). All cities are either of regional importance or of district importance.

Cities (in bold) and other settlements, by population (2001 census)
Settlement	Population
**Uzhhorod**	115,520
**Mukachevo**	86,061
**Khust**	28,643
**Vynohradiv** (Nagyszőlős)	25,565
**Berehove**	24,458
**Svaliava**	17,027
**Rakhiv**	15,243
Dubove	9,775
Mizhhiria	9,616
Korolevo	9,339
**Tiachiv**	9,256
**Irshava**	9,000
Velykyy Bychkiv	8,920
Solotvyno	8,774
Velyki Luchky	8,540
Ilnytsia	8,420
Bushtyno	8,091

== Symbols ==
The coat of arms of Zakarpattia was originally created in the end of the 1920s in the then-Czechoslovakia. The oblast's flag was approved at the XXIII plenary session of the Transcarpathian Regional Council. The coat of arms on the flag also appears on the Rusyn flag. The anthem of the Transcarpathian region is a folk musical work arranged by M. Keretsman to a poem attributed by some researchers to Oleksandr Dukhnovych, to the music of controversial Transcarpathian politician Stefan Fentsyk (according to other sources, Stepan Fentsyk himself is the author of the words). The Transcarpathian Regional Council approved the anthem of the Transcarpathian region on 22 December 2009.

== See also ==
- Carpathian Ruthenia, small historical region
- Carpatho-Ukraine, a short-lived Ukrainian state on the territory
- Ruthenians and Ukrainians in Czechoslovakia
- Museum of Folk Architecture and Life, museum displaying Zakarpattia architecture
- Eparchy of Mukačevo and Prešov
- Kárpátalja football team

== Gallery ==
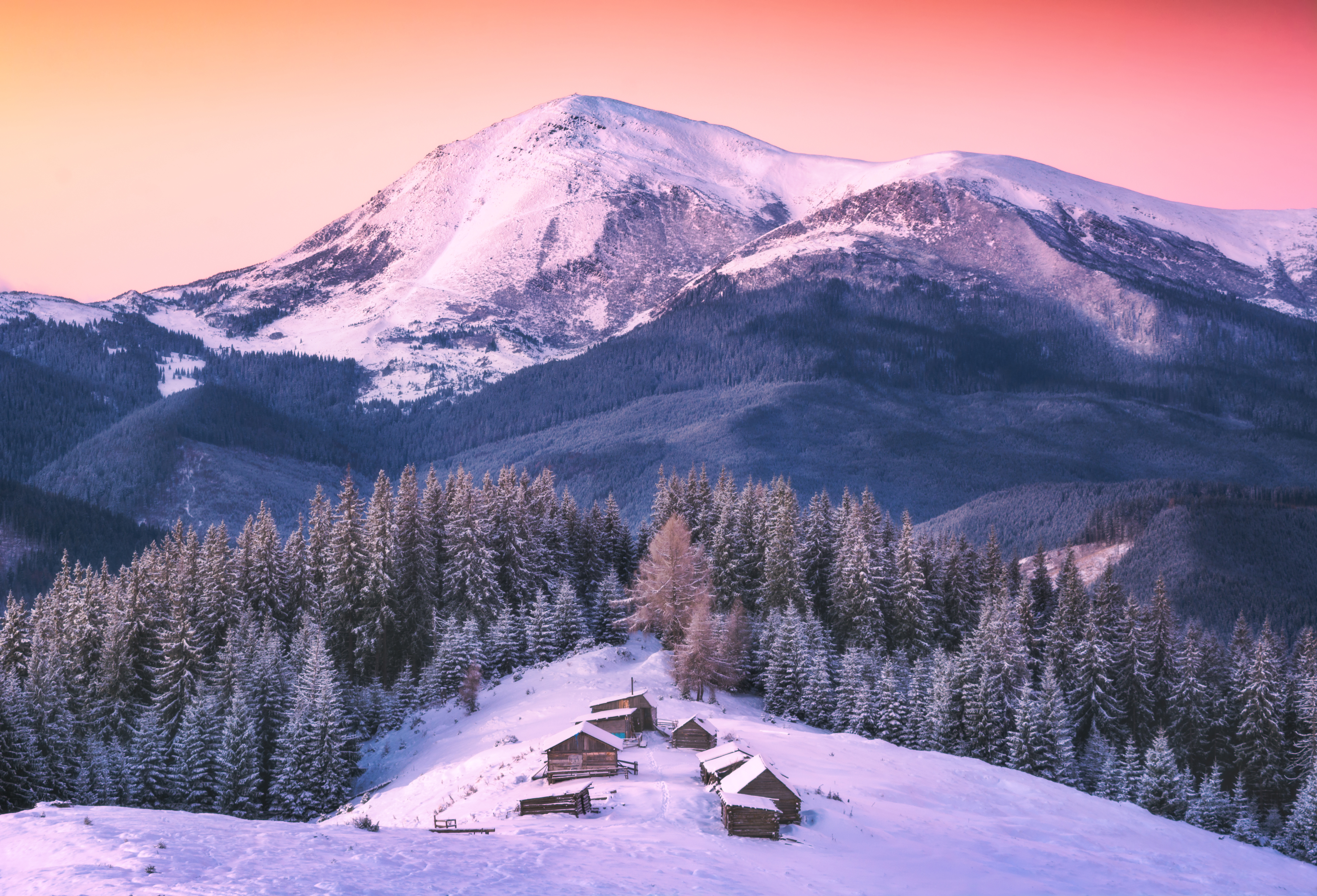
Petros - a peak in the Chornohora with height of 2,020 metres (6,630 ft)

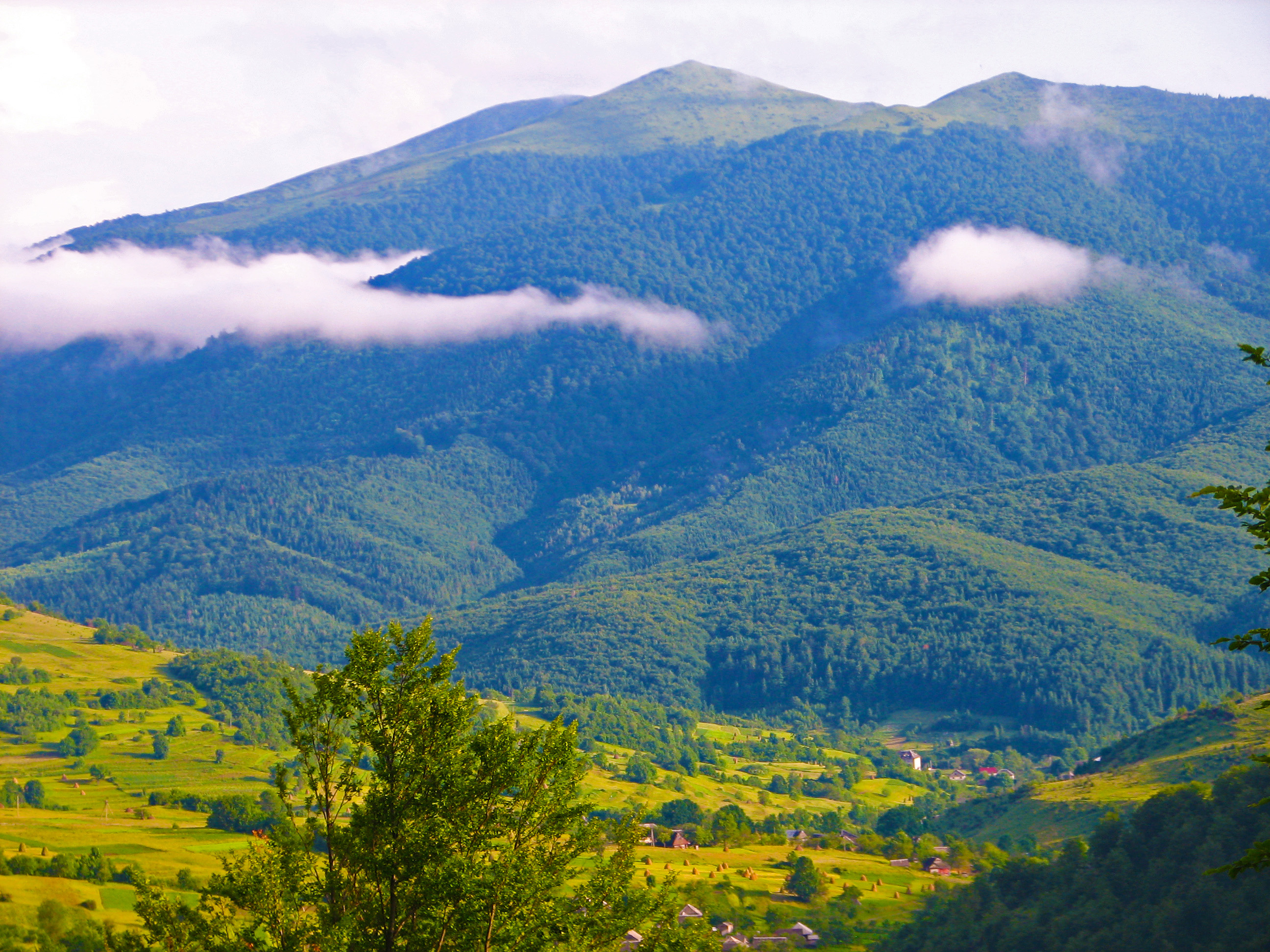
Mount Pikui

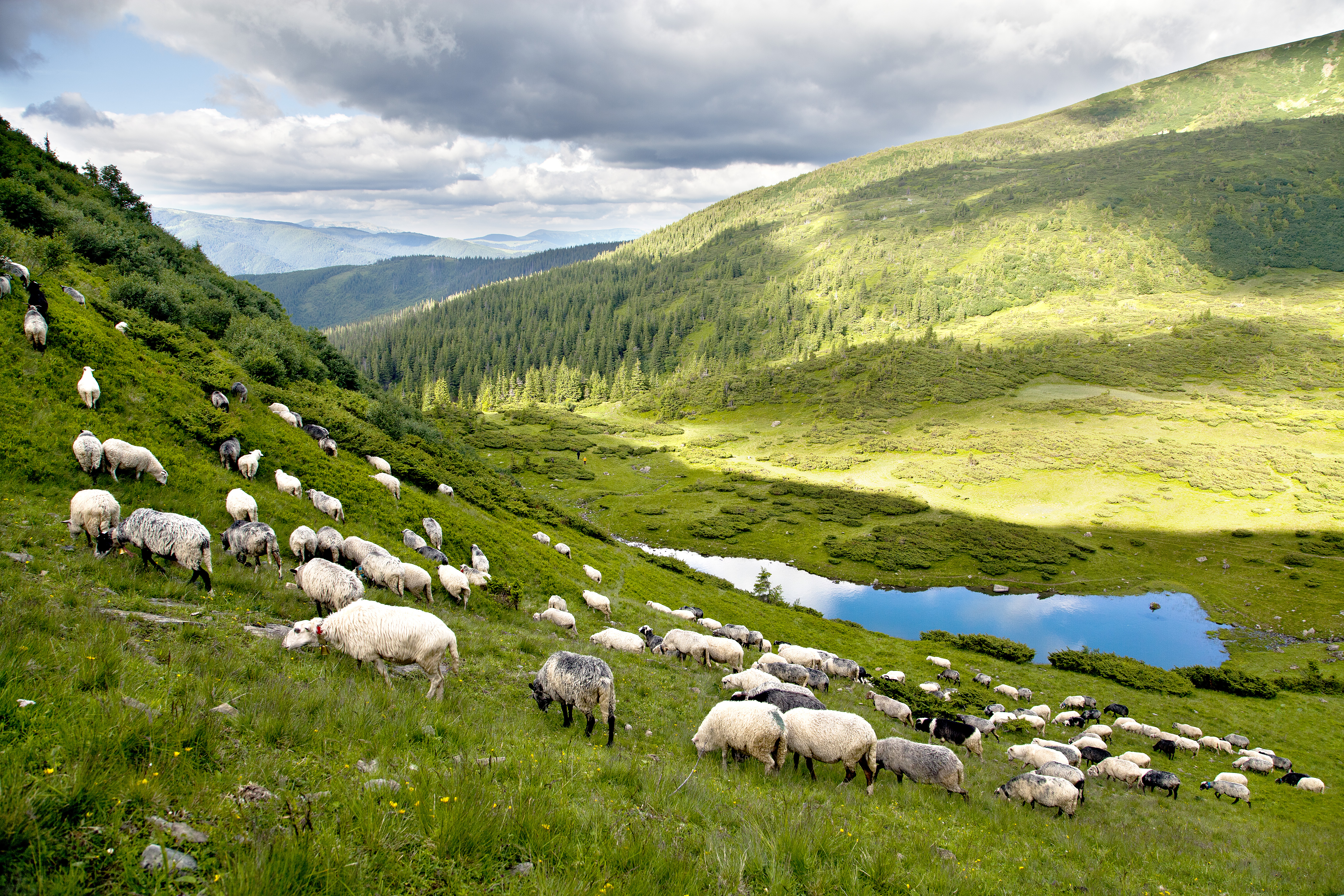
Sheep near the Lake Vorozheska

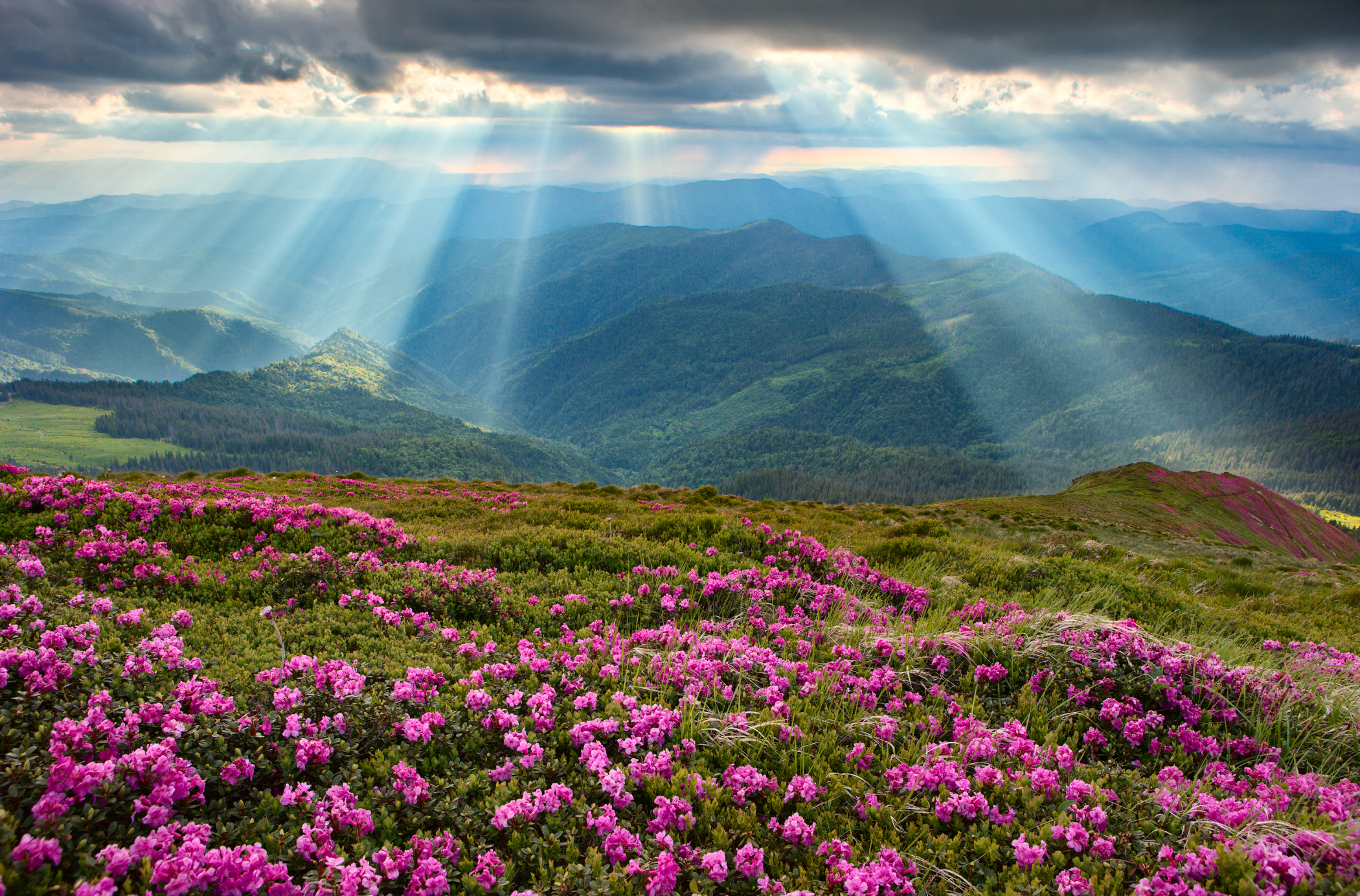
Carpathian Biosphere Reserve

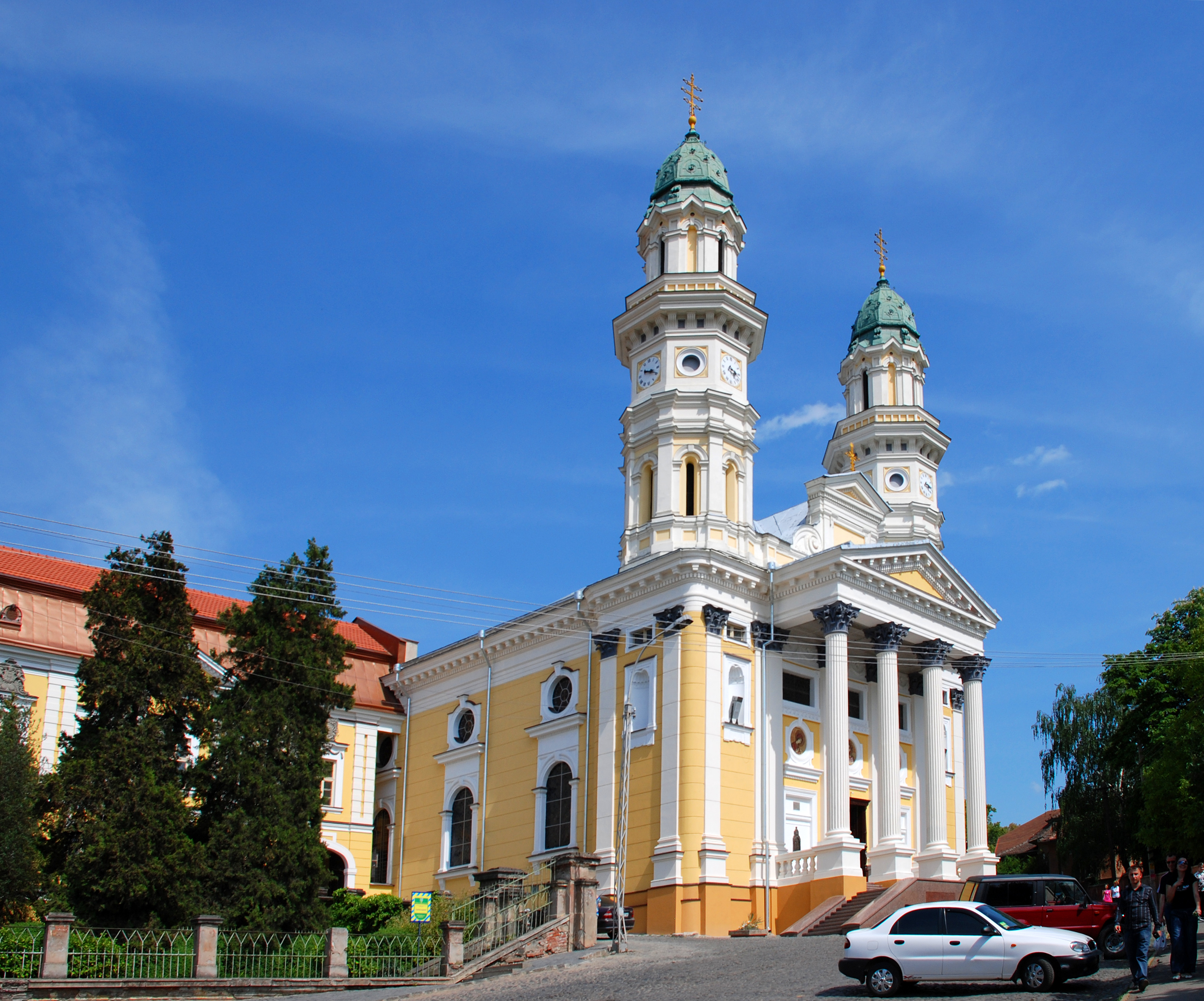
Cathedral of the Exaltation of the Holy Cross in Uzhhorod

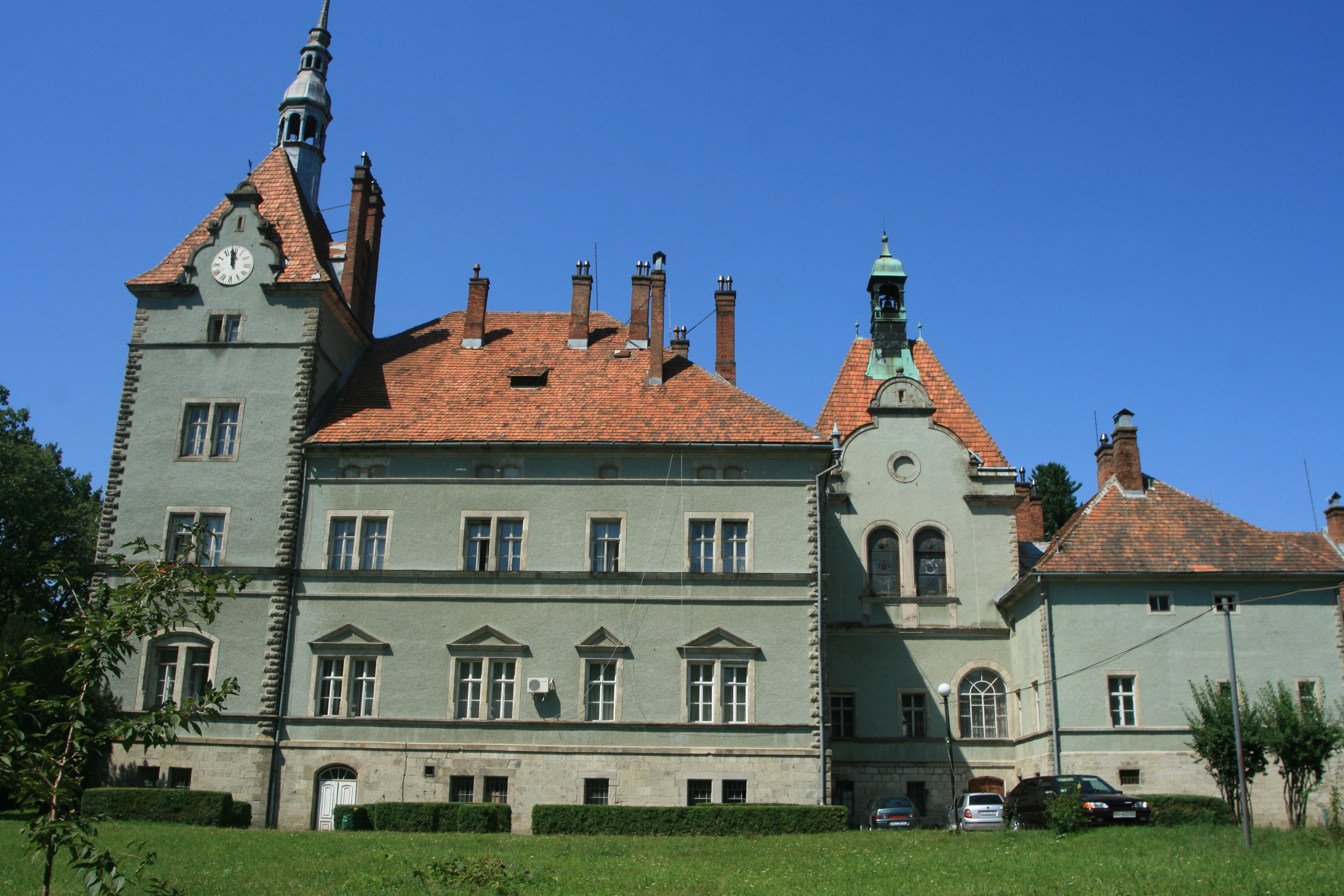
Schoenborn Castle-Palace in Chynadiiovo

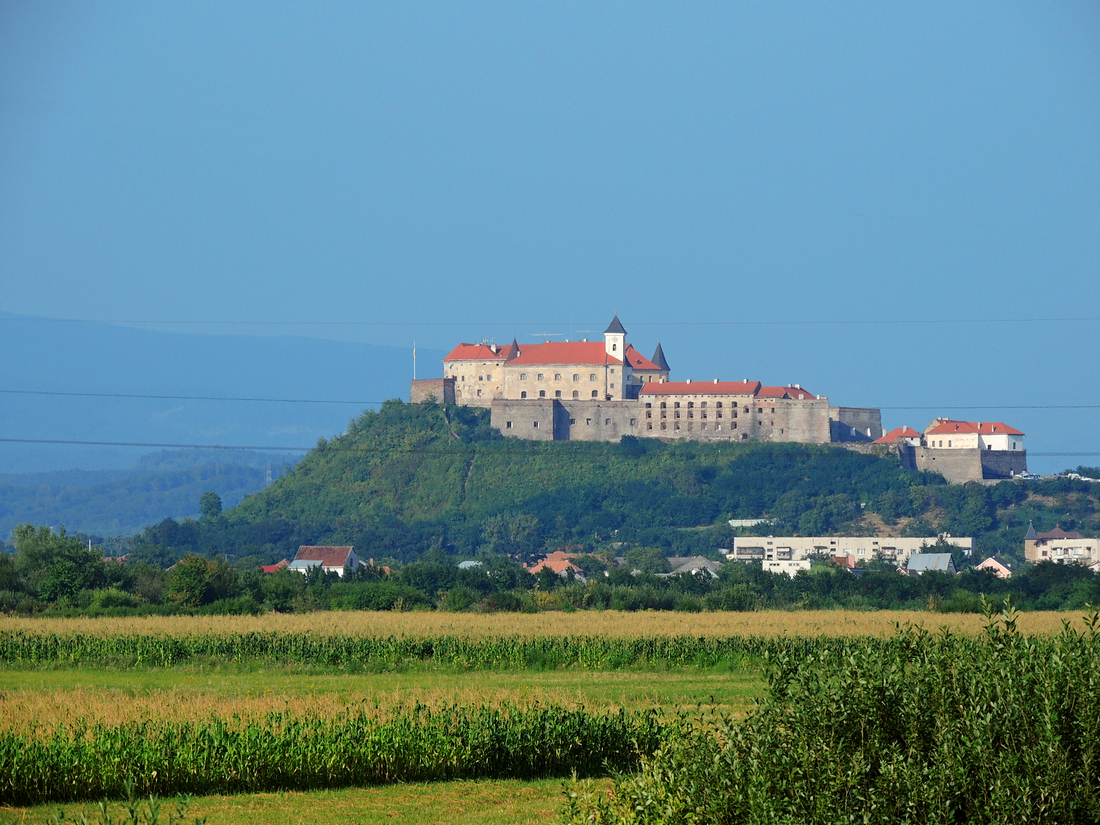
Palanok Castle in Mukachevo

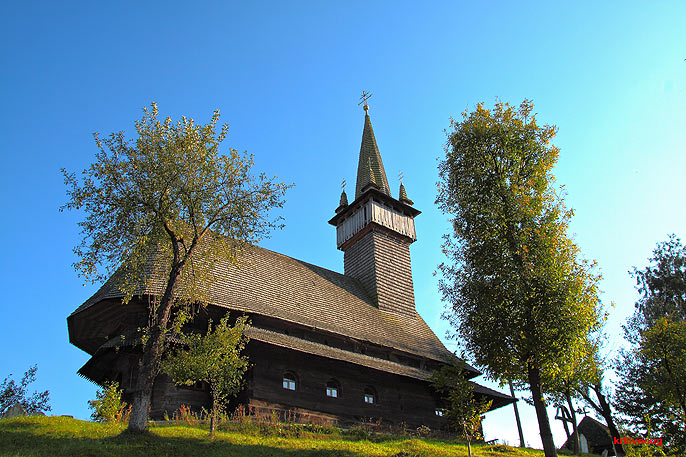
Wooden Church of St. Nicholas (1604) in Nyzhnia Apsha

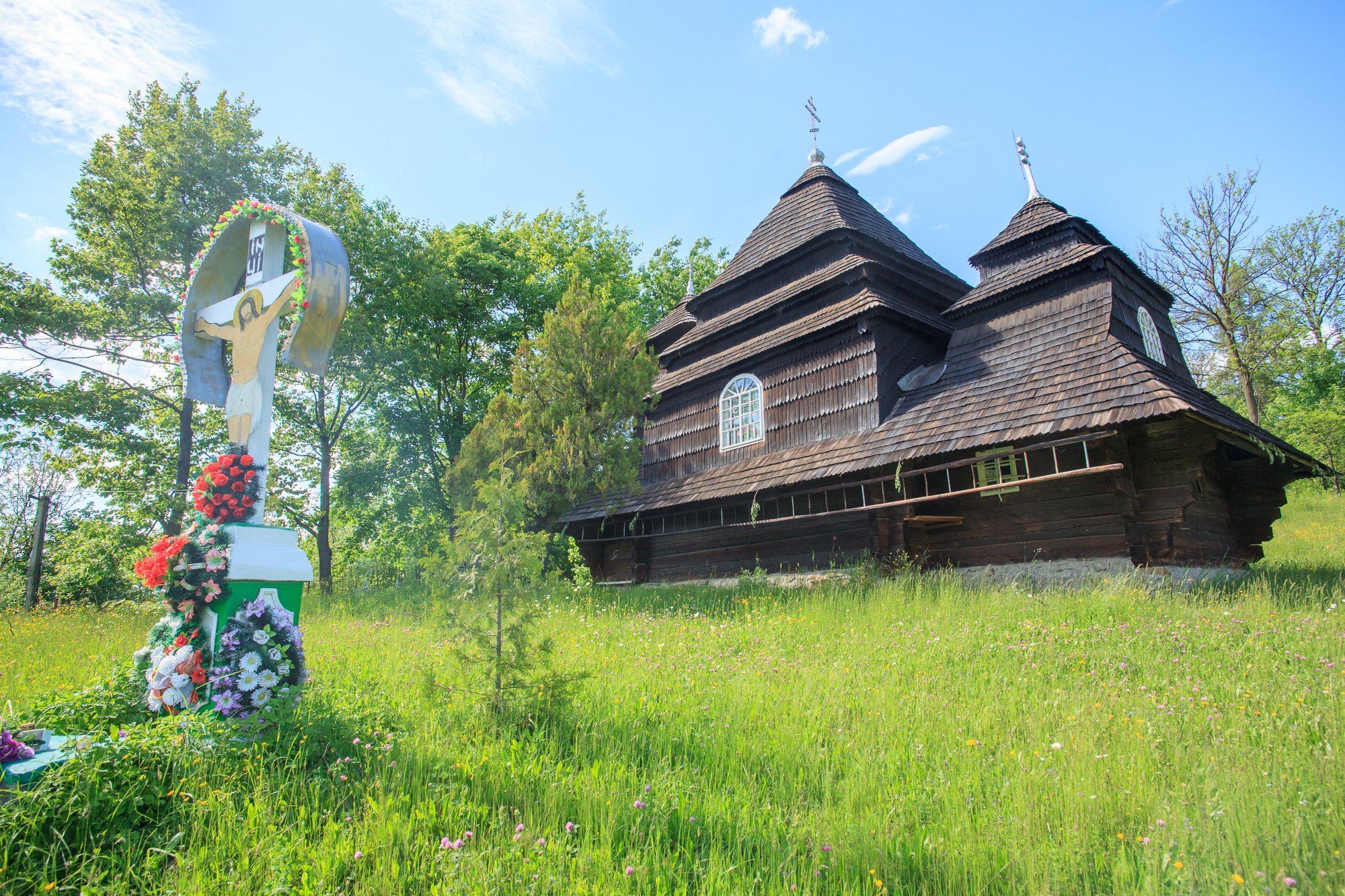
Church of the Archangel Michael in Uzhok
