= Sokyrnytsia =

Sokyrnytsia Сокирниця
- Village
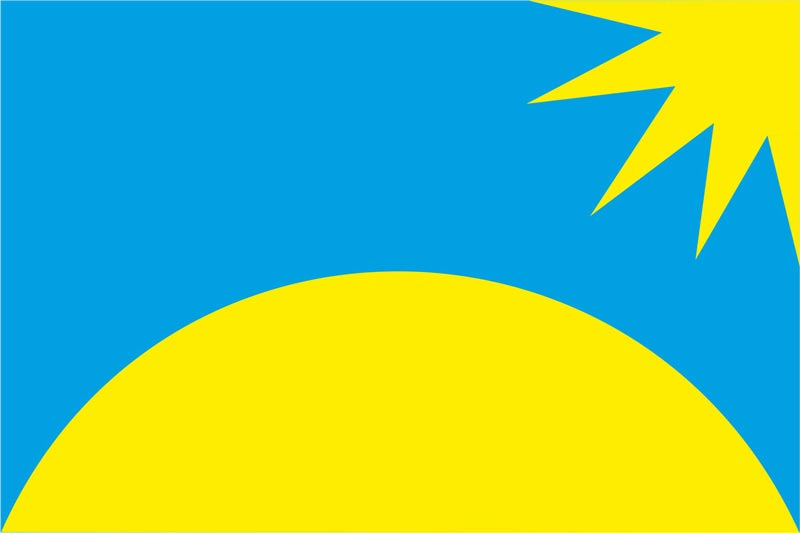
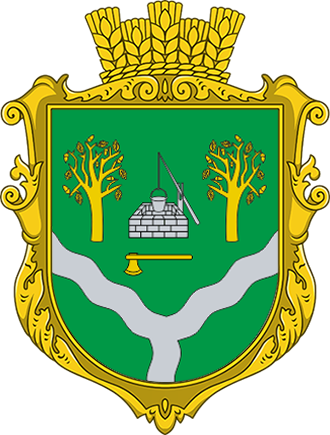
- Flag Coat of arms
- Interactive map of Sokyrnytsia
- Location of Sokyrnytsia Sokyrnytsia (Ukraine)
- Coordinates: 48°07′27″N 23°23′59″E
- Country: Ukraine
- Oblast: Zakarpattia Oblast

Government
  - Mayor: Yaroslav Sabadosh
- Elevation: 319 m (1,047 ft)

Population (2001)
  - Total: 5,217
  - Estimate (2023): 4,207
- Time zone: UTC+1 (CET)
  - Summer (DST): UTC+2 (CEST)
- Postal code: 90450
- Area code: ++380 3142

Sokyrnytsia (Ukrainian: Сокирниця, Romanian: Seclenț, Hungarian: Szeklence) is a village located on the Khust-Synevyr highway near the H09 (Mukachevo-Ivano-Frankivsk-Rohatyn-Lviv) motorway, 10 km from the district center, Khust. It is a village in Khust Raion of Zakarpattia Oblast (province) of western Ukraine.

The first mention in the documents dates back to 1389. It is thought that Slavic tribes lived here who fought with the Tatars, and later with the Hungarian feudal lords. The Bailova River which flows into the Tisza River, was the location of a large massacre there during the war with the Tatars, in which many people died. The village was linked to the construction of Khust Castle, which allegedly guarded the "Salt Way", which ran along the banks of the Tisza from Aknaszlatina (today Solotvyno), deep into the Hungarian Empire.

This is evidenced by the name of the street in the village, which is still called "Tatar" by locals (A. Hodynky Street, near the primary school). The street was named due to the camping location of the Tatar army, which moved from east to west, plundering villages.

Prior to World War II, there was a Jewish population established in the village. Like other Jews in the Khust region, they were departed to and killed at Auschwitz by May, 1944. There is a Jewish cemetery in the village. It dates to 1865.

== Church of St. Nicholas the Wonderworker ==
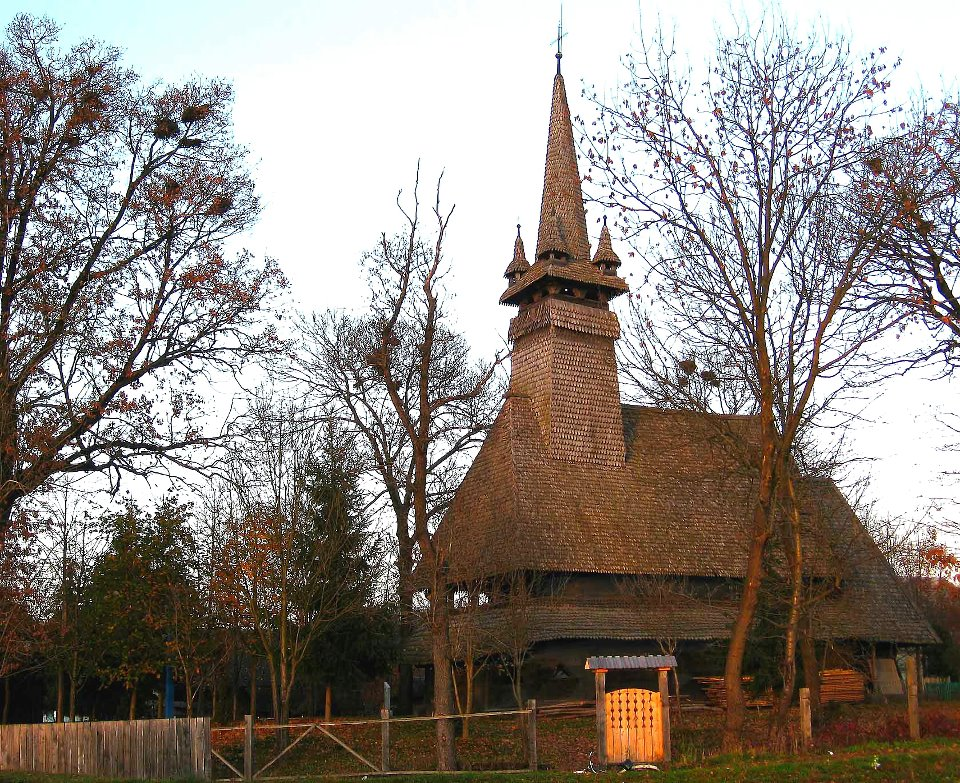
The Sokyrnytsia Wooden Church

The Church of St. Nicholas is located near the village center. This wooden church dates to 1704. The historical value of the church is evidenced by the inscription on the outside of the church: "Тут у 1707 році представилась матушка Марія…” ("Here in 1707 , Mother Mary introduced herself.")

At the end of World War II, the church was closed, most of the icons disappeared. Only two images of the Virgin and the icon of St. Nicholas survived. Also successfully preserve the frames of the vicar icons of the XVIII century, the royal gates, candlesticks, ark. Services in the church resumed only in 1990, when locals began to improve it somewhat. This stopped in 1997 when a new Greek Catholic church was built next to the monument.

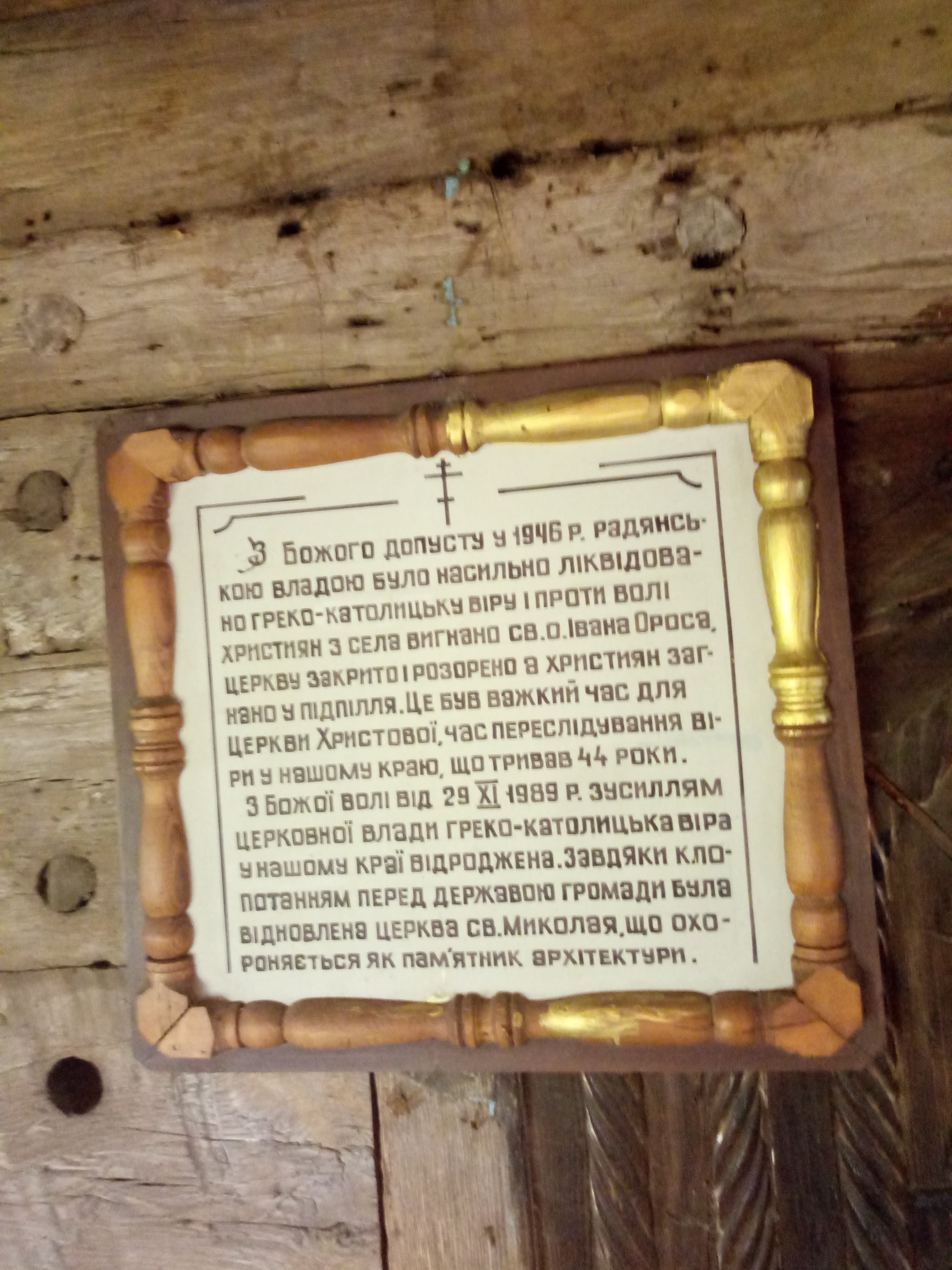
Plaque on the Sokyrnytsia Wooden Church

== See also ==
- Wooden churches in Ukraine
- Wooden churches of Maramureș
- Carpathian wooden churches
