= Vasyl Dovhovych =

Hungarian Greek-Catholic priest, philosopher

- Born: March, 1783; Ötvösfalva, Kingdom of Hungary
- Died: December 13, 1849; Huszt, Kingdom of Hungary, Austrian Empire
- Occupations: Theology, Philosophy and Poetry

Vasyl Dovhovych (1783, Ötvösfalva (now Zolotarovo) - December 13, 1849, Huszt (now Khust)) (Ukrainian: Васи́ль Довго́вич) is a Ukrainian and Rusyn philosopher, linguist, poet, Transcarpathian academic, and Priest of the Greek Catholic Church.

== Biography ==
He was born in the village of Ötvösfalva, Huszt district, then part of the Kingdom of Hungary, in March 1783, (the exact date of birth has not yet been established) in the family of peasants.

He received his secondary education in the city of Velikiy Varadyn (now Oradea in Romania). Here he tutored, and his student was the daughter of the late chief notary of the city, Agnes Wieser. With her help, the talented student mastered the Hungarian language and dedicated a number of lyrical poems to Agnes. But the poet's love was hopeless, and it is not by chance that philosophical notes burst into his work. Along with poems in Hungarian, he continued to write in Latin, and here for the first time he created the poem "Union of Love".

Dovhovych received his higher theological education in the city of Trnava in Slovakia, and completed it at the Uzhhorod Theological Seminary.

In Trnava, Dovhovych actively wrote poems in Latin and was fond of philosophy. He specially studied the German language in order to read Kant's philosophical works in the original . After a 14-year journey around the world, he returned to Uzhhorod where, after graduating from the seminary, he married Hanna Lyakhovych and set out on the path of a priest. From 1811 to 1824 he lived in the village of Dovge in the Irshav region, where he took the pseudonym Dovhovych. From 1824 to 1828 he worked in the village of Velyki Luchki in the Mukachevo region, and from 1828 to 1844 in Mukachevo itself.

In 1831, he became the first among the region's scientists to become a corresponding member of the newly created Hungarian Academy of Sciences for scientific works on history, ethnography, and theology. In 1832 he organized his poems into a collection called "Poems of Vasyl Dovhovych", which contains 19 poems in Ukrainian, 41 in Hungarian, and 131 in Latin. This handwritten collection of poems by V. Dovhovych was first published in 1982 in the Scientific Collection of the Museum of Ukrainian Culture in Svydnik, Slovakia. But all his works, both poetic and scientific, have not yet been translated into Ukrainian. Dovhovych is the initiator of Latin poetry in Transcarpathia.

He died in Khust on December 14, 1849, and was buried on Zamkova Gora (castle hill) near the Khust Castle.

== Literature ==
- Й. О. Дзендзелівський. Довгович Василь // Українська мова: Енциклопедія. — Киев: Українська енциклопедія, 2000. ISBN 966-7492-07-9
- Мацинський І. Кін. XVIII — перша пол. XIX ст. та життя і діяльність Василя Довговича. // Науковий збірник Музею української культури в Свиднику, т. 10. Пряшів, 1982;
- Малицький В. Мудрець із гір Карпатських. // Наука і культура. Україна, в. 18. К., 1984.
