= Khust urban hromada =

Urban hromada in Zakarpattia Oblast, Ukraine

Khust urban hromada Хустська міська територіальна громада
- Hromada
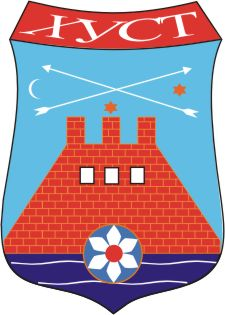
- Seal
- Interactive map of Khust urban hromada
- Country: Ukraine
- Oblast: Zakarpattia Oblast

Government
  - Head: Yuriy Marusyak

Area
  - Land: 402.3 km^{2} (155.3 sq mi)

Population (2023)
  - Total: 80,858
  - Density: 201.0/km^{2} (520.6/sq mi)
- Settlements: 28
- Cities: 1
- Villages: 27
- Website: khust-miskrada.gov.ua

Khust urban territorial hromada (Ukrainian: Хустська міська територіальна громада, romanized: Khustska miska terytorialna hromada) is one of the hromadas of Ukraine, located in the country's western Zakarpattia Oblast. Its administrative centre is the city of Khust.

Khust urban hromada has a total area of 402.3 km^{2} (155.3 mi^{2}), and also has a population of 80,858 (as of 2023).

== Settlements ==
In addition to one city (Khust), the following 27 villages are also part of the hromada:

- Boroniava
- Vertep
- Danylovo
- Zalom
- Zarichne
- Iza
- Karpovtlash
- Kireshi
- Kopashnovo
- Koshelovo
- Krainie
- Krainykovo
- Kryva
- Kryvyi
- Lypovets
- Lypcha
- Lunka
- Nankovo
- Nyzhnie Selyshche
- Oleksandrivka
- Osava
- Poliana
- Rokosovo
- Sokyrnytsia
- Steblivka
- Khustets
- Chertizh
