= Oleksandr Slyvka =

Oleksandr Ivanovich Slivka
- Born: 1909; Ötvösfalva, Austria-Hungary
- Died: 2008 (aged 98–99); Khust, Ukraine
- Occupation: Writer
- Writing career
- Language: Ukrainian

Oleksandr Ivanovich Slivka was a Ukrainian composer.

He was born in the village of Ötvösfalva, then part of Hungary, Austria-Hungary (now Zolotarovo, Ukraine) into a peasant family. He graduated from the Khust Gymnasium in 1931 and the history faculty of the Uzhgorod State University in 1952 by correspondence.

He worked as a teacher in the 1930s in Tyachiv Oblast in the village of Velyatino, and later in the post-war years - in Khust Secondary Schools No. 1 and 3.

As an actor, he took an active part in the work of the drama group at the Khust House of Culture.

His first literary works - the plays named "Bearded Misunderstanding" and "Saint Nicholas" were published at the end of 1937 in the literary magazine "Bee". During his period of teaching in Tyachiv Oblast, a number of his stories were published in the magazine "Our Native Land" and in the newspaper "Literary Sunday". The collection of short stories titled "Under A Thatched Roof" was published as a separate edition in 1943.

Slivka died in 2008 and is buried at the Khust cemetery in nearby Khust.
