= Iza, Ukraine =

Iza Іза
- Village
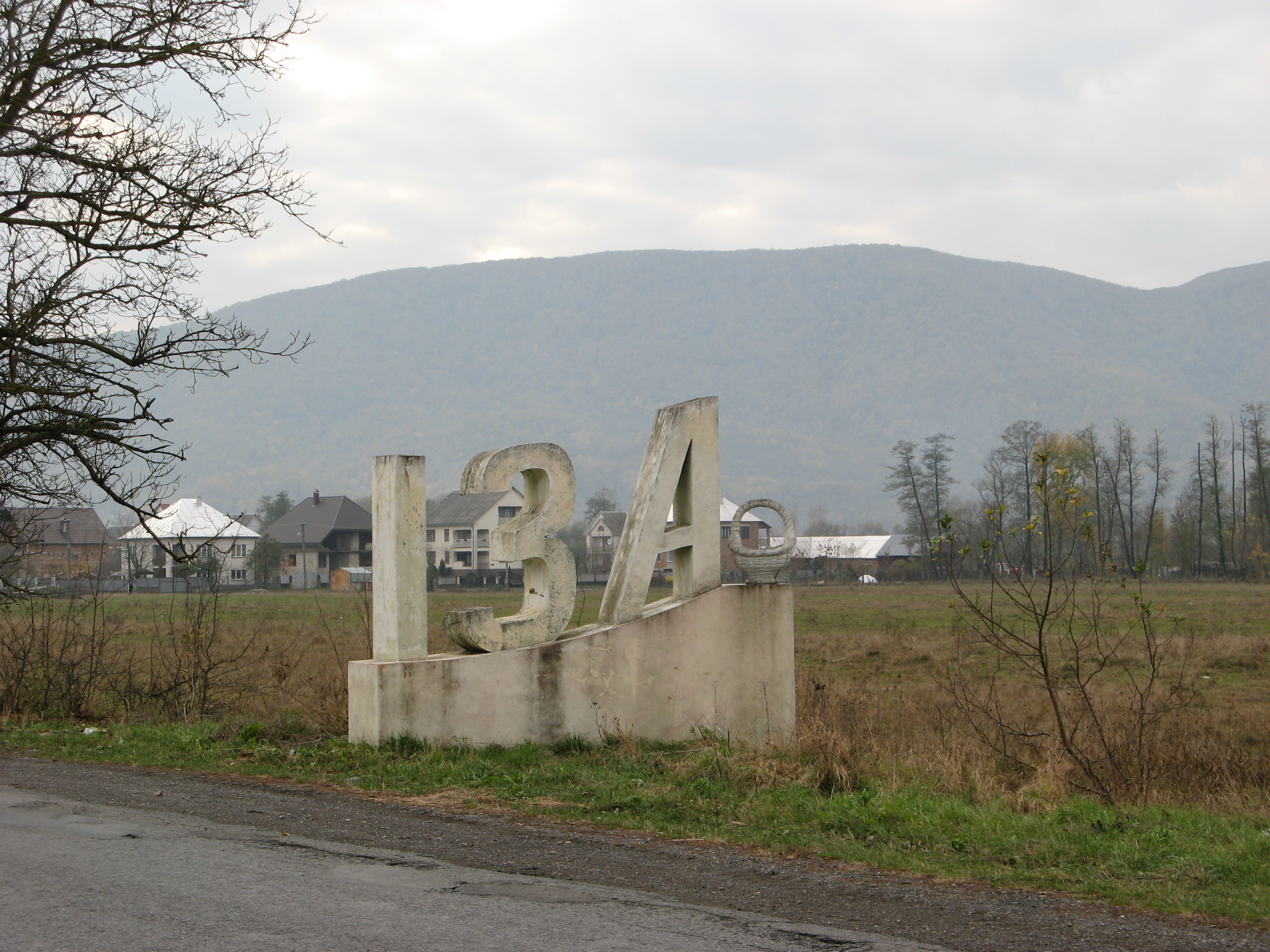
- Interactive map of Iza
- Location of Iza Iza (Ukraine)
- Coordinates: 48°12′50″N 23°19′43″E
- Country: Ukraine
- Oblast: Zakarpattia Oblast
- Founded: 1646
- Elevation: 319 m (1,047 ft)

Population (2018)
  - Total: 5,800
- Time zone: UTC+1 (CET)
  - Summer (DST): UTC+2 (CEST)
- Postal code: 90441
- Area code: +380-3142

Iza (Ukrainian: Іза; Rusyn: Иза; Hebrew: איזה; German: Isa; Russian: Иза) is a village in the Khust Raion of Zakarpattia Oblast in western Ukraine. It is located between two mountain ranges, on the left bank of the river, 5 km from the Khust city center and railway station. The population is 5,800 (2018).

== History ==
Two burial mounds located on the outskirts of Iza indicate the settlement of the region since 1st millennium BC. The first group of mounds is located to the right of the road to Lypcha, the second is to the northeast, closer to the village. The burial grounds were investigated by the Zatlukal brothers in 1939–1940, M. Y. Smishko in 1948-1949 and V. H. Kotyhoroshko in 1975–1976. The burial culture of Carpathian mounds of the 1st - 4th centuries AD has been investigated.

The first written references to Iza date back to 1387. The legend relates the name of the village to the name of the first settler called Isaiah - a name that became later common in the area.

In the 1600s the inhabitants of Iza were serfs of the Khust dominion, and then the feudal lords of the Sigmunds. The population was mainly engaged in agriculture - they sowed rye, barley, wheat, and oats. Livestock also developed. In addition, fishing and hunting were common here. There was an abundance of fish in the rivers Tisza and Rika, and game in the adjacent forests. The serfs paid monetary and natural repayments, and also practiced serfdom. They gave the dominion one-ninth of the crop, one-tenth of the cattle, a certain number of chickens, eggs, geese, and a set sum of money. They also kept the dominion's cattle during the winter. The inhabitants of Iza took part in the peasant war of 1514 under the direction of György Dózsa. In 1646, a union was introduced here.

Ukrainian writer-polemicist Mykhailo Andrella lived in Iza. He died and was buried in the village. In 1768 there were 79 peasant farms in Iza. The size of the serfdom was not limited in any way: the peasants worked at home one week, and in the serfdom in favor of the landowner the next. Particularly difficult was the work for the landlords during the harvest. In 1786, more than a third of Iza's population died during the famine.

In 1830, 1198 people lived in the village. As a result of the revolution of 1848–1849, serfdom was abolished.

In the early twentieth century, Iza was a large village of Maramureș County. Whereas in 1873 there were 365 dwellings and 1,707 inhabitants, in 1900 there were 519 dwellings and 2,505 inhabitants. Of the total population of 2,248 people, (90 percent) were Ukrainians, 219 were Germans, 36 were Hungarians, and 42 were Romanians. 7,706 cadastral holdings of land were attributed to the village.

Since 1899 an elementary school has been operating in Iza. It was taught in Hungarian. In the 1908–1909 school year, two teachers taught 120 students at the school. In 1900, only 433 residents were able to read and write. Ivan Rakovsky, who lived in the village from 1859 to 1885, opposed the policy of national oppression of the Ukrainian population. He came here from Budapest, where he was the editor of several Russian periodicals. He died in Iza, where he was buried.

During the 20th century, Iza was a major centre of Eastern Orthodoxy in Transcarpathia. In 1913-1914 around 30 peasants from the area were put on trial before a Hungarian court in Sziget on accusations of propaganda of Orthodox religion.

After the collapse of the Austrian Empire in 1918, the village was occupied by Hungary, Romania (late April 1919), and in September Czechoslovakia was established in the region.

In the 1920s-1930s, the village began to engage in carpentry and weaving. Izan carpenters were known far beyond the village. A small part of the inhabitants worked with carriages. The rural population was paid to the rich with a meager payment.

Ukrainian elementary schools have been operating in Iza since 1919, while the Czech ones have been operating since the beginning of the 1930s. In 1938, 300 pupils were enrolled in both primary schools, and 14 teachers were employed. There was a library and a reading room. In 1939, there were 3,631 people living in the village, and there were 761 dwellings. Jews probably settled in Iza in the first half of the 18th century.

It has been historically an ethnically Rusyn village. During the time that the area was part of the Kingdom of Hungary, the village was located in the district of Dolha of Máramaros County.

=== World War Two ===
From March 15, 1939, the village was part of the Carpatho-Ukraine, but already on March 18, Hungarian troops occupied Iza. A ghetto was built near the village.

With the Hungarian occupation of Iza in March, 1939, Jews were persecuted and pushed out of their occupations. In 1940–41, dozens of Jews from Iza were drafted into forced labor battalions and others were drafted for service on the Eastern front, where most died.

In 1941, a few Jewish families without Hungarian citizenship were expelled to Nazi-occupied Ukrainian territory to Kamianets-Podilskyi, and were murdered there.

The remaining Jews of Iza were deported to Auschwitz in late May, 1944.

== Wickerwork and baskets ==
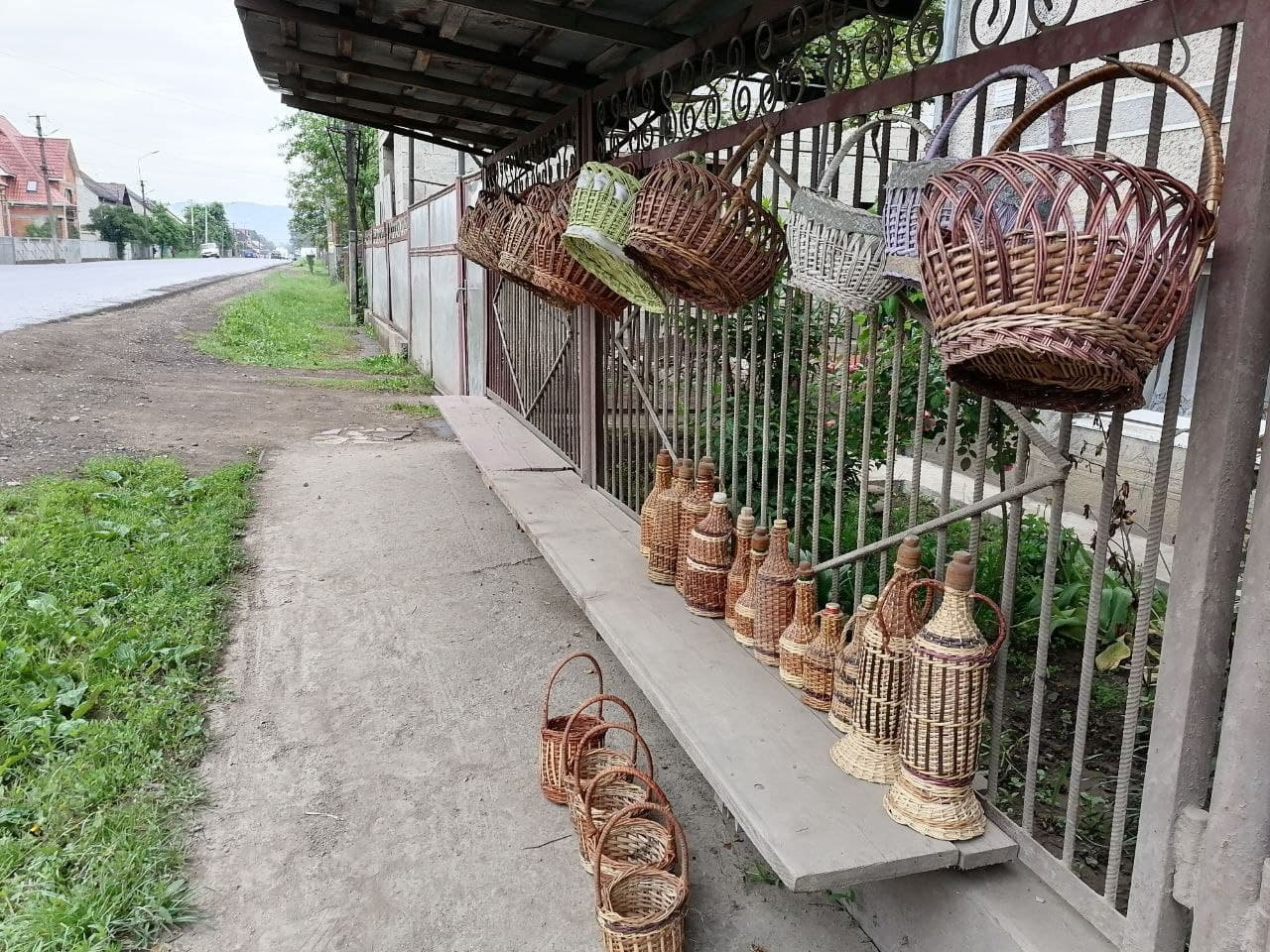
Vine baskets from Iza

At the end of the 19th century, residents began weaving baskets from vines. One of the early weavers was named Ivan Kashko. He taught this craft to his two sons, and then a few more residents of the village began to engage in it. They sold their wares at the market in Khust and other cities. In the years 1909-1910 many of the landless residents of Iza were engaged in basket weaving. Over time, this became the main craft of many of the residents of Iza. After the vine is harvested, it is cut, boiled, cleaned, dried, and dyed. The residents of Iza weave baskets of different shapes and sizes, and they also weave chairs, cabinets, chairs, tables, plates, and coasters. This tradition continues today, as Iza is known for high-quality wickerwork and baskets. On July 6, 2022, the tradition of vine weaving in Iza village was inscribed in the National Inventory of Elements of the Intangible Cultural Heritage of Ukraine.

Jean Renoir, son of Auguste Renoir, mentioned in his book that on veranda of his father were wicker pieces of furniture from Iza, Austria-Hungary.

== Economy ==
Iza is known for the handmade baskets sold in the village. There is also a farm where spotted deer are raised.
