= Transcarpathian dialect =

Dialect of the Ukrainian or Rusyn language

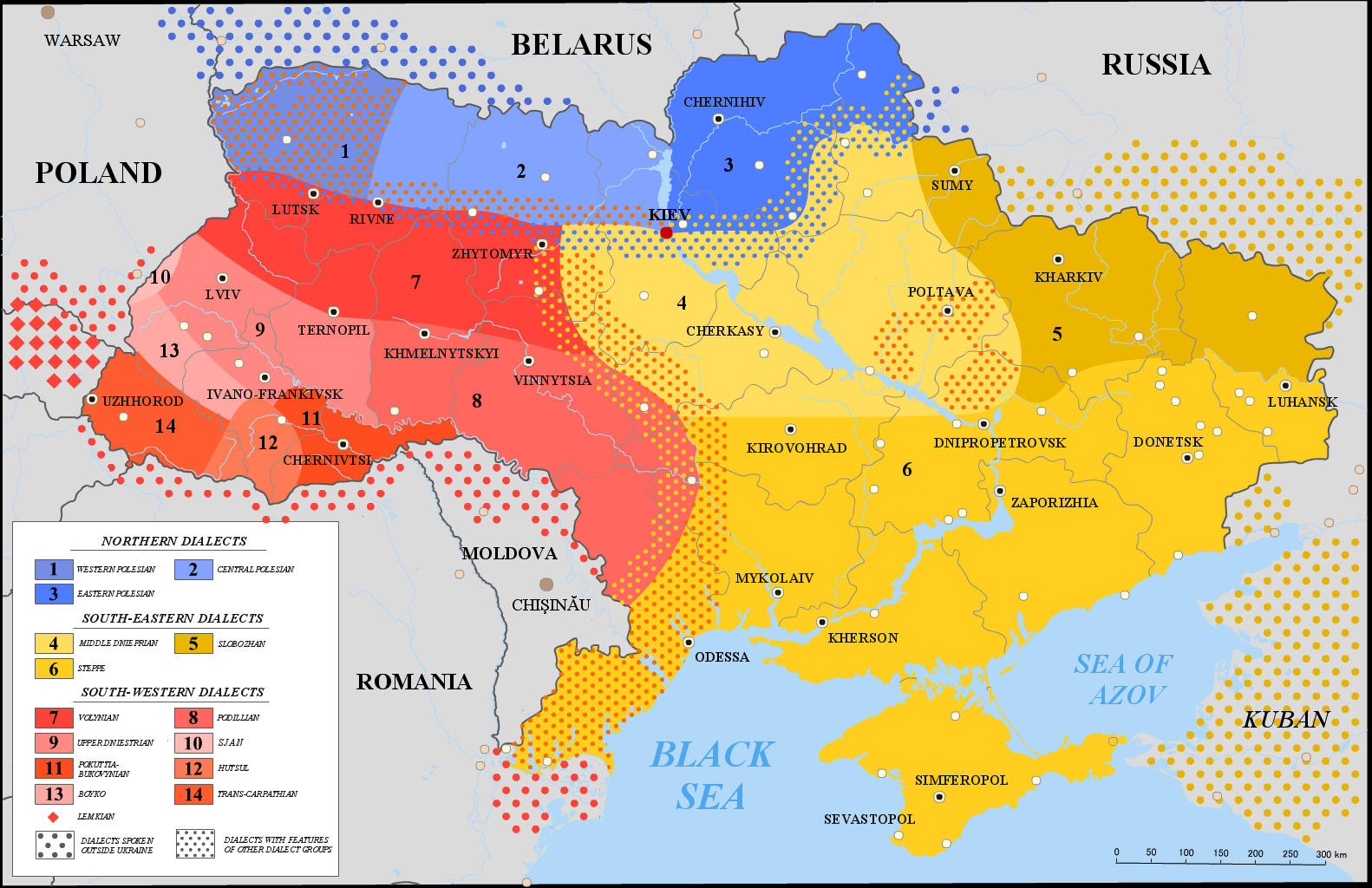
Map of Ukrainian dialects, number 14 is the Transcarpathian

The Transcarpathian dialect is a dialect of the Ukrainian language spoken in Transcarpathia. It is often alternatively classified as a part of the Rusyn language.

== Borders ==
It is widespread in the valley of South Carpathians and the right bank of the Tisza river. It is used in some villages of Slovakia and Romania. It is bordered by the Boyko dialect to the north, the Hutsul dialect to the east, and the Lemko dialect, Polish, Slovak, Hungarian languages to the west and Romanian language to the south.

== History ==
The main features of the Transcarpathian dialect were formed by the late 16th and early 17th centuries. Written monuments, which reflected the features of the Transcarpathian dialect, were found from the beginning of the 15th century. The dialect was used by some writers, such as V. Dovhovych (1783-1849) and Nikolai Nagy (1819-1862). During the 19th century the usage of the dialect decreased because of neighboring languages more widely used. The dialect was studied by linguists Ioann Fogorashi-Berezhanin, I. Verkhratskyi, Pavlo Chuchka and others.

== Subdialects ==
The Transcarpathian has 4 subdialects:

- Borzhava (Central)
- Uzh (Western)
- Maramorosh (Eastern)
- Verkhovyna (Northern Highland)

== Main features ==
=== Phonetic features ===
- Presence of unrounded vowel [ɨ]: сын [sɨn], дрыва [drɨˈwɑ], хытрый [ˈxɨtrɨi̯], which is absent in standard Ukrainian;
- evolution of the original phonemes [ě], [e], [o] in some varieties into [y], [u]: д’ÿўка [ˈdʲyu̯kɐ], хл’ÿў [xlʲyu̯], мн’ут [mnʲut], вус [ʋus] (standard Ukrainian дівка [ˈdʲiu̯kɐ], хлів [xlʲiu̯], мед [mɛd], віз [ʋʲiz];
- transition of [ɛ] into [ɪ] in both stressed and unstressed positions before [i], [y], [ɪ], as well as palatalized consonants: пирші [ˈpɪrʃʲi], динь [dɪnʲ] (standard Ukrainian перші [ˈpɛrʃʲi], день [dɛnʲ]);
- assimilation of [ɪ] to [i] without palatalization of the preceding consonant: сіні [ˈsinʲi] (standard Ukrainian - сині [ˈsɪnʲi]);
- transformation of initial unstressed [o] into [ʊ], [u̯]: на ўрісі [u̯ˈrʲisʲi] (standard Ukrainian - на горісі [ɦoˈrʲisʲi]);
- frequent preservation of word-initial [ɪ]: игла [ɪɦˈlɑ];
- evolution of Proto-Slavic consonant clusters -tl-, -dl- into [ɦ]: пл’уг [plʲuɦ], пл’ÿг [plʲyɦ], привйýг [preˈʋʲuɦ], привÿг [preˈʋʲyɦ] (in literary Ukrainian - плів [plʲiu̯], привів [preˈʋʲiu̯]);
- [t͡s] and [r] can be palatalized in all positions: типирь [tɪˈpɪrʲ] (standard Ukrainian - тепер [teˈpɛr]); in part of subdialects, particularly central ones, [t͡s], [r], [z], [s] are depalatalized before [i] derived from Old Slavic [ě]: цільíй [t͡siˈlɨi̯], рíпа [ˈripɐ], сíм [sim], на нôзí [noˈzi] (standard Ukrainian - цілий [t͡sʲiˈɫɪi̯], рíпа [ˈrʲipɐ], сíм [sʲim], на нôзí [noˈzʲi]);
- preservation of "soft" [t͡ʃʲ] in most central and western varieties;
- prepalatal [l] (so-called "European l") before all vowels: липа [ˈlɪpɐ] (standard Ukrainian липа [ˈɫɪpɐ];
- lack of prothetic consonants in many varieties: улиця [ˈulɪt͡sʲɐ], оріх [oˈrʲix] (standard Ukrainian вулиця [ˈwuɫɪt͡sʲɐ], горіх [ɦoˈrʲix]);
- secondary [n] after original palatalized [m] if it is followed [a] stemming from [e]: сімня [ˈsimnʲɐ] (literary Ukrainian - сімʼя [ˈsʲimjɐ]);
- secondary [l] after original palatalized [ʋ]: здороўля [zdoˈrɔu̯lʲɐ] (standard Ukrainian здоровʼя - [zdoˈrɔu̯jɐ]);
- elimination of [u̯] after [ʊ], [y] stemming from [o]: вуця [wʊˈt͡sʲɑ] (standard Ukrainian - вівця [ʋʲiu̯ˈt͡sʲɑ]);
- lack of palatalization of [n] before [k], [g]: малинкый [mɐˈleŋkɨi̯] (standard Ukrainian маленький [mɐˈɫɛnʲkɪi̯]);
- many varieties are characterized with assimilation in consonant clusters: пáн’ц’кый [ˈpanʲt͡sʲkɨi̯], пуннимáти [pʊnːɪˈmatɪ], уммьíти [ʊˈmːɨtɪ] (standard Ukrainian - панський [ˈpanʲsʲkɪi̯], піднімати [pʲidʲnʲiˈmatɪ], обмити [obˈmɪtɪ]);
- nouns with -ьjе are characterized with a change of consonants in the root, lack of gemination, change of [e] into [i] in words derived from verbs with the suffix -и-, word-final [ɐ]: вôжін’а [woˈʒinʲɐ], хôжін’а [xoˈʒinʲɐ] (standard Ukrainian возіння [woˈzʲinʲːɐ], ходіння [xoˈdʲinʲːɐ]).

=== Morphological features ===
- Weak to non-existent differentiation between "soft" and "hard" word stems in declination of nouns: вôдôу — зимлôў, волóви — кôн’óви, волóм — кôн’óм (standard Ukrainian - водою — землею, волові — коневі, волом — конем);
- ending -и in genitive plural: кóни, л’уди́ (standard Ukrainian - коні, люди);
- preservation of ending -и in genitive and locative case among some feminine nouns: земли, на земли (standard Ukrainian - землі, на землі); usage of specific forms in declension of masculine nouns: dative - стôростови, чôлôвíкови (standard Ukrainian - старості, чоловікові), instrumental - стáрôстоў, стáростом (st. Ukr. - старостою), locative - на стáростови (st. Ukr - на старості; in plural: dative - стáрôстÿм, вôлум, вôлÿм, вôл’ім st. Ukr. - старостам, волам, sometimes also nominative - старостóве (st. Ukr. - старости), locative - на стáрôс’т’іх (st. Ukr. - на старостах);
- presence of ending -ы in particular plural nouns in instrumental case: з вóльí, пуд ворóты (literary Ukrainian - з волами, під воротами); ending -ix in locative: на вôл’іх, на вôрôт’іх (lit. Ukr. - на волах, на воротах);
- ending -ом in dative of particular nouns in plural: л’уд’ом, дви́р’ом (st. Ukr. - людям, дверям); -ох in locative: на кôн’ох, л’ýд’ох (St. Ukr. - на конях, людях);
- neutrum single nouns of 4th declension have endings -’ат’ом, -’атом: тил’áт’ом, тил’áтом (st. Ukr. - телям);
- preservation of archaic form -ове in some plural nouns, which is partially preserved after declension: сынове, кумове, кумóвам; з кумóвами;
- in some varieties single 3rd declension nouns in genitive preserve the archaic ending -е: сóле, цéркве, л’убвé (standard Ukrainian - солі, церкви, любові);
- neutral adjectives preserve their long form: дóбройе, in western varieties дóброй (standard Ukrainian добре);
- comparative adjectives are composed with the suffix -’ый (ширьíй, молóжый) or particle май (май вели́кый); the same particle under stress is used to compose superlative adjectives (мáйвеликый); verbs and nouns can also be compared with the use of this particle (май жонá, май рôбл’у);
- particular numeral forms characteristic of Transcarpathian dialect are: йедéн (standard Ukrainian - один), дві (feminine and neuter), диўйаддс’ат (standar Ukrainian - девʼяностo), двíста, двíсто, двáсто (st. Ukr. - двісті), personal masculine forms двайє́, трийé, чотырé (Central and Eastern varieties), двóме, тр’óме, чотыр’óме (Western varieties), fractional numerals пу(ў) четверта, пÿ(ў) четверта (st. Ukr. - три з половиною);
- enclitic forms of pronouns: ся (st. Ukr. - себе), ня (st. Ukr. - мене), тя (тебе), го (його), ї (її), на ню (на неї), ми (мені), ти (тобі), му (йому), in questions - тко, ко (St. Ukr. хто), што;
- infinitive forms of verbs preserve the endings -ти, -чи: говорити, печи (st. Ukr. - пекти);
- in Central and Eastern varieties [d] in verb forms is replaced with [ʒ]: хожу [xoˈʒu] (st. Ukr. - ходжу [xoˈd͡ʒu]); in Northern and Western - with [d͡ʒ] - си́джу [ˈsɪd͡ʒʊ];
- in Central and Western varieties [j] in verbs with -a- stem is assimilated into [ʋ] in 1st person sing. and 3rd person pl.: знáву [ˈznaʋʊ], дýмавут’ [ˈdumɐʋʊtʲ] (standard Ukrainian - знаю [ˈznajʊ], думають [ˈdumɐjʊtʲ]);
- shortened forms of some verbs in 2nd and 3rd person: дýмаш, думат’, думат (literary Ukrainian - думаєш, думають);
- Eastern, Southern and some Central varieties have unpalatalized [t] as ending of verbs in 3rd person sing., as well as 2nd person in imperative mood: хóдит, хôд’ат, ход’íт;
- 1st pers. plural verbs in present and simple future modes have the ending -ме: беремé (standard Ukrainian - беремо);
- preservation of personal particles in many verbs: ходи́в-им, ходи́в-ем, ходи́ла-м; ходи́в-ис’, ходи́в-ес’, ходи́ла-с’; ходи́ли-сме, ходи́ли-с’ме, ходи́ли-сте, ходи́ли-с’те;
- subjunctive mood is formed by using personal particles: писáў бим, бым; писáў бис’, быс’; писали бисме, быс’ме etc.; central varieties also use the particle быхъ: даў быхъ (in standard Ukrainian only the particle би is used: писав би, дав би).

=== Syntax ===
- Use of conjunctions и (та), тай;
- use of personal pronouns to express relations of possession: óтиц’ ми, мáти ти, сус’íдÿў нам, мáтери сôбі (St. Ukr. - мій батько, твоя мати, нашого сусіда, твоїй матері);
- use of verb infinitive in locative case: чуў го с’мійáтис’а (St. Ukr. чув, як він сміявся);
- word constructions with the preposition на instead of по (иду на вôду, на гри́бы);
- comparative constructions with the conjunction ги (май высóкый /ги ути́ц’ му);
- use of adverbs to express condition or cause: мôзôл’í ми с’а начинили, дрывá рубáйучи.

=== Lexicon ===
The table below list a small portion of lexical differences (since there are more than 6,000) between the Transcarpathian dialect and Standard Ukrainian. Some of the words were taken from Hungarian or Slovak. Examples of this are railway station, piece and thousand, which derive from Hungarian words állomás, darab and ezer.

Some differences between the dialect and Standard Ukrainian
Transcarpathian dialect	Standard Ukrainian	English
Адістерувати (Adisteruvaty)	Критикувати (Krytykuvaty)	Criticize
Бавитися (Bavytysya)	Гратися (Hratysya)	Play
Бай (Bay)	Погано (Pohano)	Bad
Вать (Vat)	Або (Abo)	Or
Каждоденно (Kazhdodenno)	Щоденно (Shchodenno)	Daily

Loanwords from Hungarian language
Transcarpathian dialect	Standard Ukrainian	Hungarian	English
Аломаш (Alomash)	Залізничний вокзал (Zaliznychnyy vokzal)	Állomás	Railway station
Дараб (Darab)	Шматок (Shmatok)	Darab	Piece
Езерь (Ezer)	Тисяча (Tysyacha)	Ezer	Thousand
Жеб (Zheb)	Кишеня (Kyshenya)	Zseb	Pocket
Варош (Varosh)	Місто (Misto)	Város	City

== See also ==
- Rusyn language
