= Zolotarovo =

Zolotarovo Золотарьово Ötvösfalva
- Village
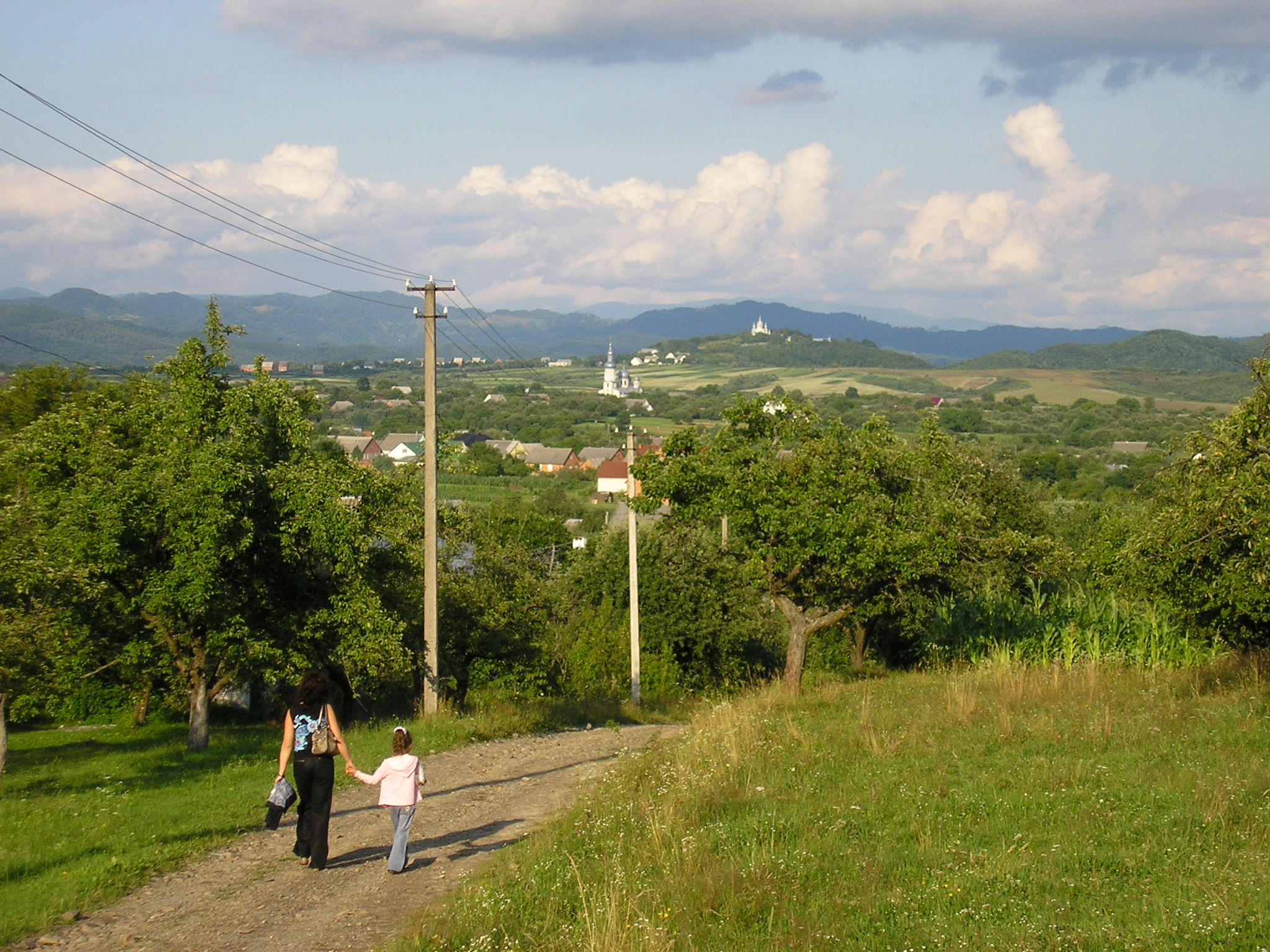
- View of Zolotarovo

- Location of Zolotarovo Zolotarovo (Ukraine)
- Coordinates: 48°10′51″N 23°30′06″E
- Country: Ukraine
- Oblast: Zakarpattia Oblast
- Raion: Khust Raion
- Founded: 1616

Government
  - Mayor: Valeriy Patskan
- Elevation: 319 m (1,047 ft)

Population (2001)
  - Total: 4,226
- Time zone: UTC+1 (CET)
  - Summer (DST): UTC+2 (CEST)
- Postal code: 90441
- Area code: +380-3142

Zolotarovo (Ukrainian: Золотарьово, Hungarian: Ötvösfalva, German: Solotarjowo, Czech: Zlatary) is a village located in the Khust Raion of Zakarpattia Oblast (province) of western Ukraine.

The population at the 2001 census was 4,266 people. The village is governed by a council. The head of the council is Valery Vasyliovych Patskan,

The village used to have a fruit factory.

Zolotarovo has been twinned with Newport-on-Tay since 2002.

== Name ==
According to one legend, the first goldsmiths in the village were good masters, made various dishes from the plates, and hammered for weaving. They also performed carpentry and blacksmithing works, for which they were called "goldsmiths", which means they had "golden hands".

== History ==
The first written mention of the village dates was 1616. This was described by a village teacher Omelyan Belinsky in 1938 in his historical chronicle of the village. He wrote, "It is spread over the picturesque multi-level landscapes of the gray smoky Carpathians: hills, valleys, hills and many streams. In spring it sinks in apple-pink-white flowers, in summer—in a fabulous variety of Carpathian flowers, in autumn—in delicious, aromatic fruits of apples – ferkovani, and in winter the same apple-trees, shrouded in silver frost and white dazzling snow." It has been historically an ethnically Rusyn village. The local schools have taught Rusyn language since 2003.

During the time that the area was part of Kingdom of Hungary, the village was located in the district of Huszt, Máramaros County.

On October 9, 2011, a record was set in Zolotarevo for the largest apple pie in Ukraine. The pie's dimensions were: length – 12.70 m, width – 0.58 m, weight – 246.5 kg.

=== World War I ===
Twelve men from Zolotarevo were killed fighting in World War I.

=== World War II ===
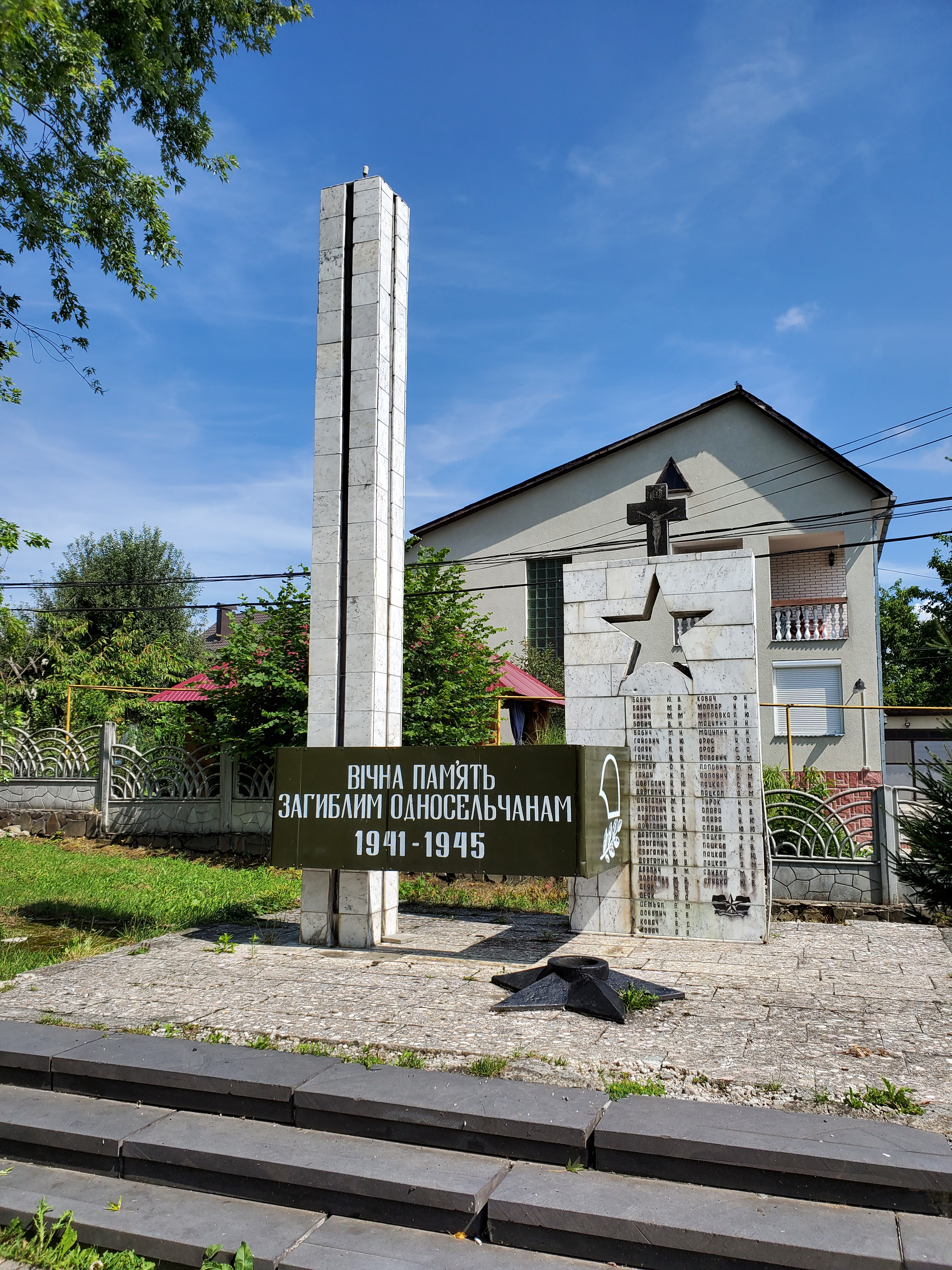
Village War Memorial

Prior to WWII, students were given an option to study Rusyn, Ukrainian, and/or Russian. On March 15, 1939, as part of the occupation of Transcarpathia by the Kingdom of Hungary, the Hungarian army entered the village. Mass arrests and interrogations of citizens. Nearly 80 people left the village in the fall of 1939 and in 1940 and crossed the border into the Soviet Union through a pass in the village of Synevyrska Polyana to seek refuge. Some were captured by Hungarian army and returned home. And those who managed to cross the border were caught on the other side. Hungarian was taught in the schools.

In April 1944 Jews of Zolotarovo were deported to the ghetto in nearby Khust prior to being deported them to Auschwitz at the end of May.

On October 23, 1944, the village was liberated by the Soviet army. 55 residents of Zolotarevo - participants of the Second World War died or went missing. In 1961, a memorial sign was erected to these fallen villagers. In 1986, a new monument to the fallen fellow soldiers was unveiled. the original memorial was buried next to the new one.

== Churches ==
There are four churches in the area around Zolotarovo.

The oldest is the Greek Catholic Church at the northeast side of the village. The Greek Catholic Church of John the Baptist Cathedral was founded in 1865. Inside is a painting of "The Last Supper", the work of an Italian master, and four icons: Jesus Christ, Blessed Virgin Mary, St. St. Nicholas the Wonderworker and St. John the Baptist, as well as a picturesque iconostasis with "royal gates" and images of archangels, apostles and other saints. A bell tower was built near the church. Not far from the temple is a church lighthouse (built in 1863) and a chapel (built in 1860). The lighthouse was erected for the priests' residence and for the educational activities of the children. In Soviet times it was used as a school and as a hostel for children from remote parts of the village. The chapel was erected at the expense of goldsmiths who worked in America. At the request of the wage earners, five crosses of hewn stone were made for the remnants of these funds. On January 20, 2015, the church celebrated its 150th anniversary.

A newer Russian Orthodox church is near the center of the village on a side road.

As of 1865 there was a Jewish cemetery in the village. It was marked on maps of the time. No trace of it exists today.

== Notable people ==
- Vasyl Dovhovych (1783–1849) – historian, priest,
- Ivan Holyak (1946–1993) - Ukrainian composer
- Oleksandr Slyvka (1909–2008) – author of the Khust National Theater,

== Gallery ==
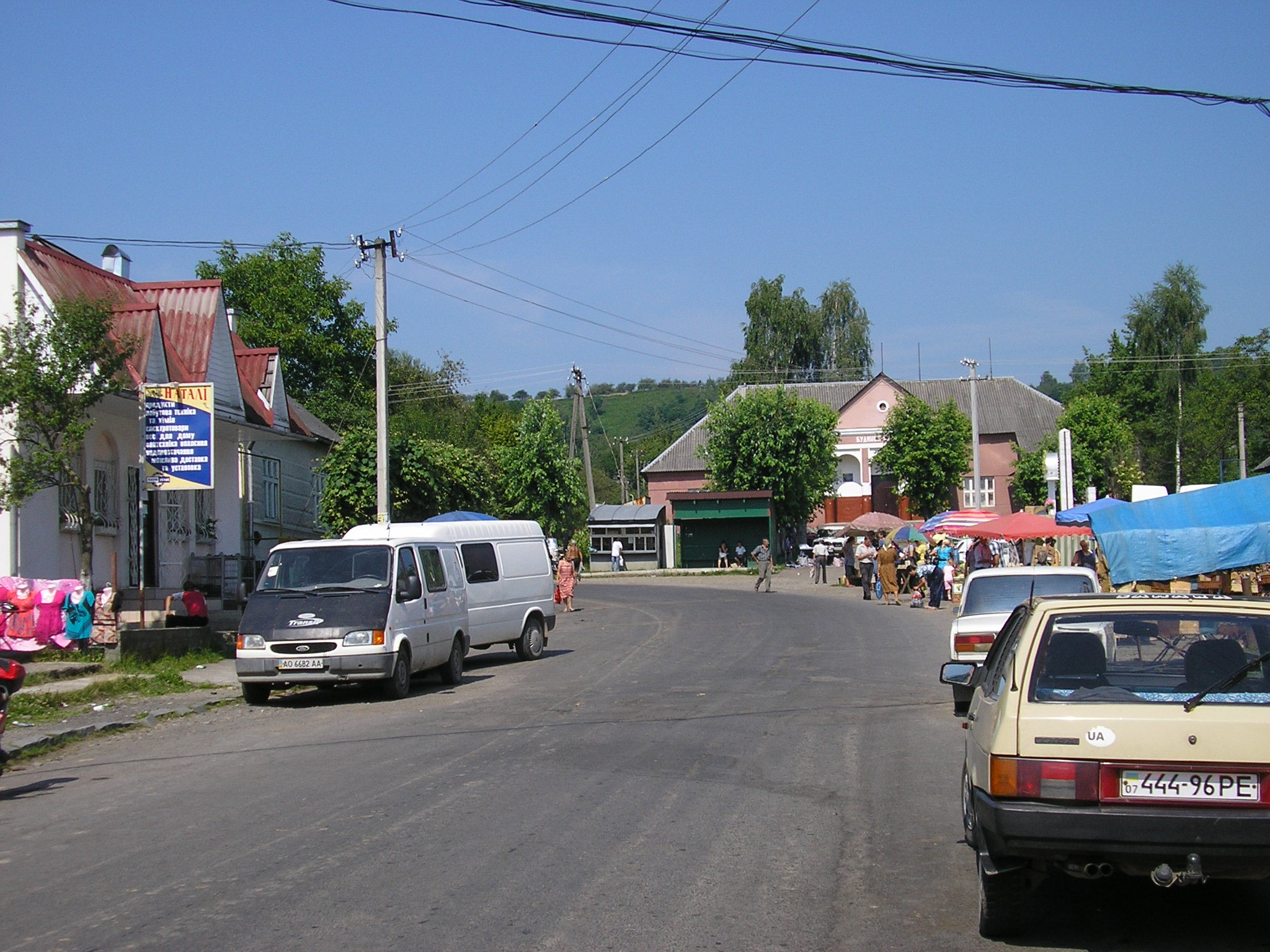
Zolotarovo central street

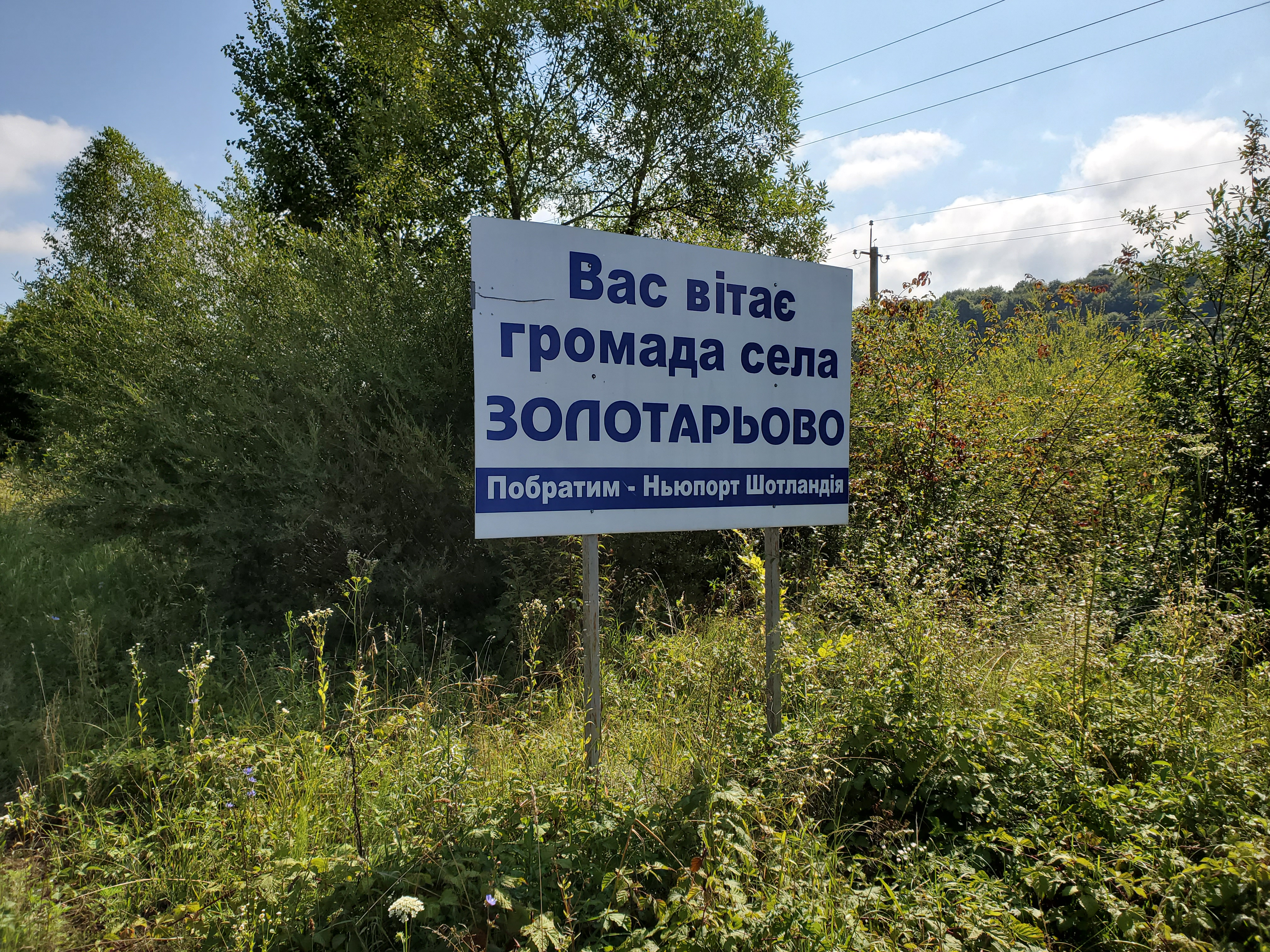
Sign at the village entrance

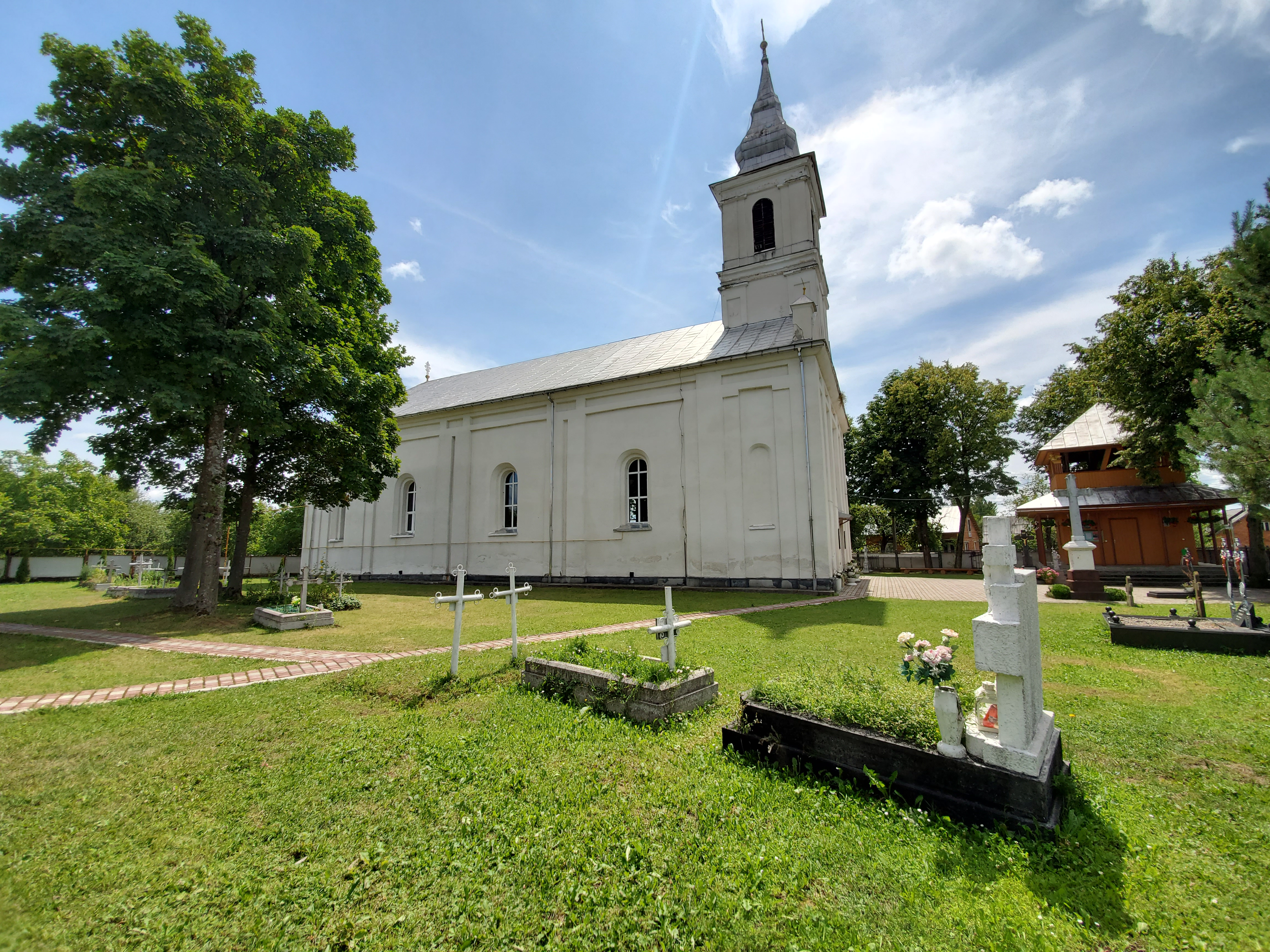
Greek Catholic Church
