= Leslie Buck =

American businessman (1922–2010)

- Born: Laszlo Büch; September 20, 1922; Chust, Czechoslovakia
- Died: April 26, 2010 (aged 87); Glen Cove, New York, U.S.
- Occupation: Businessman
- Known for: Designing the Anthora cup
- Spouse: Ella Farkas (m. 1949)
- Children: 3

Leslie Buck (September 20, 1922 – April 26, 2010) was an American business executive and Holocaust survivor who designed the Anthora coffee cup, which has become an iconic symbol of New York City since its introduction in the 1960s.

== Early life ==
Buck was born Laszlo Büch into a Jewish family on September 20, 1922, in Chust, Czechoslovakia (now part of Ukraine). Buck's parents were murdered during the Holocaust during World War II. Buck was imprisoned by the Nazis during the occupation, surviving his captivity at Auschwitz and Buchenwald concentration camps. Buck moved to the United States following World War II, settling in New York City. Once in the United States he adopted the anglicized name, "Leslie Buck."

== Career ==
Buck partnered with his brother, Eugene, and ran an import-export business. The two brothers launched a paper cup maker based in Mount Vernon, New York called Premier Cup sometime in the late 1950s. Buck left the family business to take a position with a start-up paper cup manufacturer called the Sherri Cup Company during the mid-1960s. He originally worked as Sherri Cup's sales manager, before becoming the company's marketing director.

=== Anthora coffee cup ===
As marketing director of Sherri, Buck wanted to get its products into New York City's diners and other eating establishments, many of which were owned by Greeks or Greek Americans. Buck designed the Anthora paper coffee cup with Greek themes to appeal to them. Leslie Buck retired from Sherri Cup in 1992. The company gave him 10,000 specially made Anthora cups, each with an inscription, to celebrate his retirement.

== Personal life ==
Buck married Ella Farkas in 1949. They had two daughters and a son. At the time of his death, Buck lived in Glen Cove, New York and Delray Beach, Florida. He previously lived in Syosset, New York.

Buck died of Parkinson's disease at his home in Glen Cove on April 26, 2010, at the age of 87.
