= Myroslav Dochynets =

Ukrainian journalist

Myroslav Ivanovych Dochynets Мирослав Іванович Дочинець Shevchenko National Prize laureate
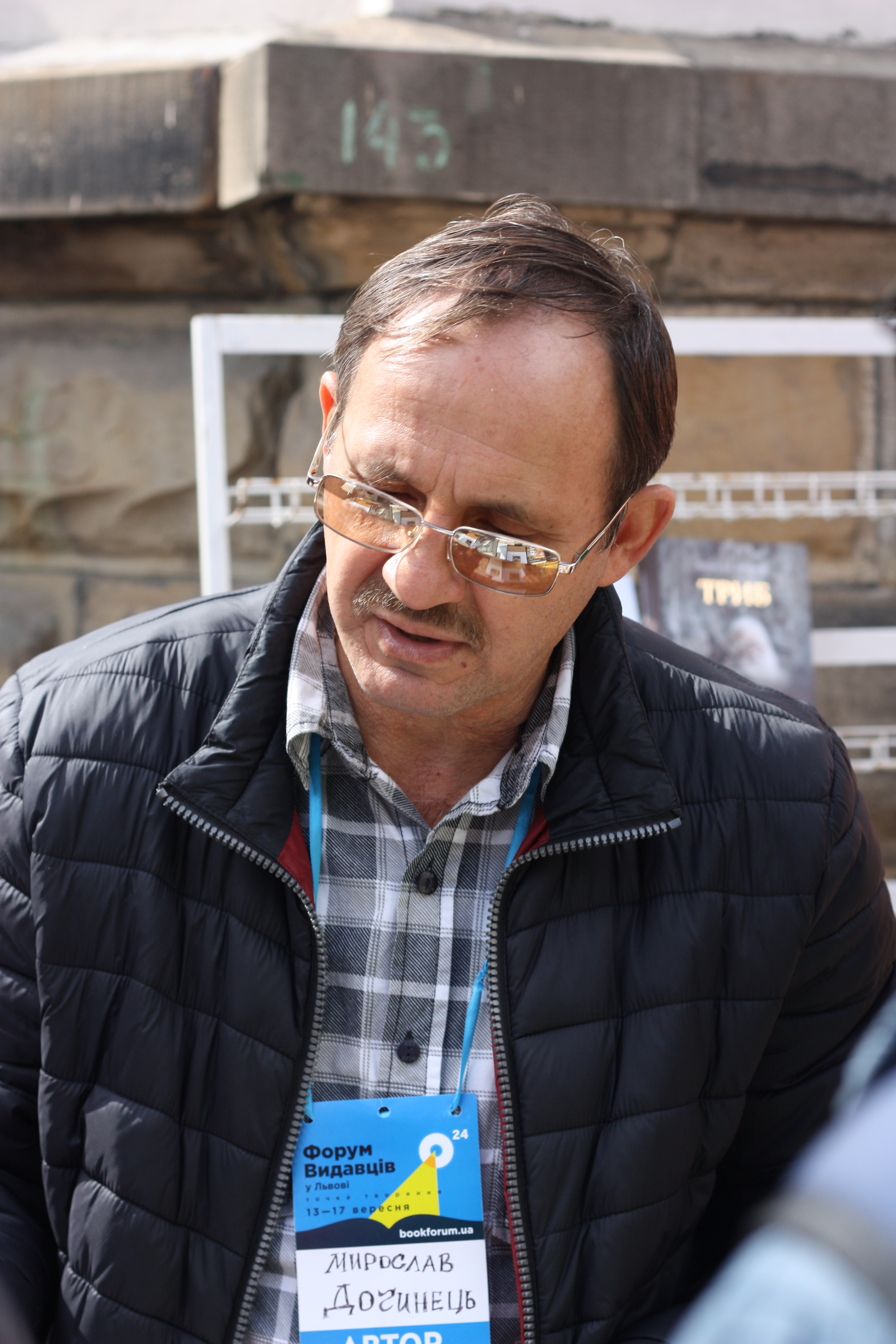
- Born: Мирослав Іванович Дочинець; 3 September 1959 (age 66); Khust, Zakarpattia Oblast, Ukrainian SSR, Soviet Union (now Ukraine)
- Education: University of Lviv
- Occupations: writer, journalistian

Myroslav Ivanovych Dochynets (Ukrainian: Мирослав Іванович Дочинець, born 3 September 1959) is a Ukrainian writer and journalist. In 2003, he became a member of the Association of Ukrainian Writers.

== Life and career ==
Dochynets was born in Khust, Zakarpattia Oblast, Ukraine in a family of teachers. In 1977, he enrolled in Lviv University's Faculty of Journalism. In 1982, he began working as a journalist at the newspaper "Youth of Transcarpatia". He founded the newspaper "News of Mukachevo" in 1990 and the publishing house "Carpathian Tower" in 1998.

Dochynets works in the field of literature since the 1980s. He is the author of about twenty books, including novels, short stories and the philosophical and psychological testament "Many years. Happy years" that has become a bestseller in several Slavic countries. His works have been translated into Russian, Hungarian, Slovak, Romanian, Polish, French, English, Japanese, Italian.

Dochynets is a member of the Writer's Union of Ukraine and the Association of Ukrainian Writers. He is the winner of two international literary awards and the "Golden Ukrainian Writers" award for the largest circulation of a book. He was nominated for three consecutive years for the Taras Shevchenko National Literary Prize.

== Awards ==
- 1998 – "Journalist of the year in Zakarpattia"
- 2004 – winner of the "Carpathian Crown" international literary award
- 2012 – Golden Writer of Ukraine award
- 2014 – Shevchenko National Prize laureate
