= Rika (river) =

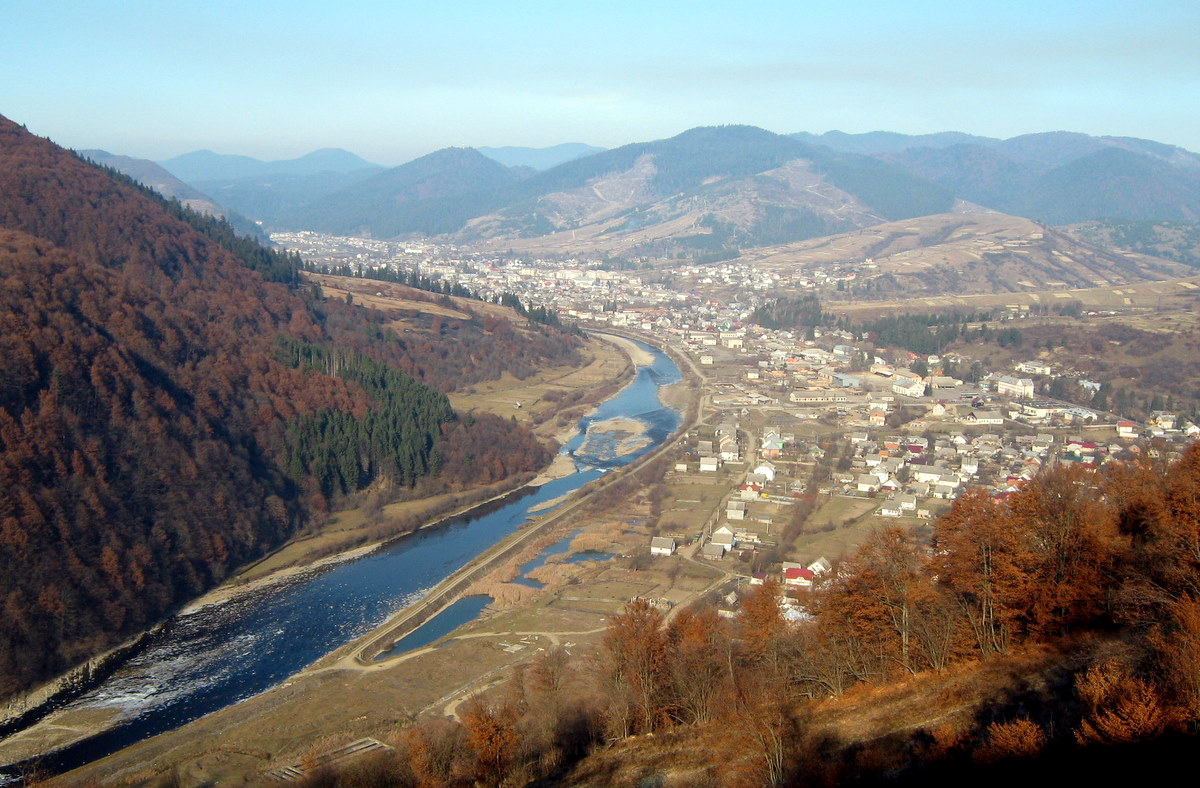

Location
- Country: Ukraine

Physical characteristics
- Source
  - location: Eastern Carpathians
- Mouth
  - location: Tisza near Khust
  - coordinates: 48.1761°N 23.2625°E
- Basin size: 1,145 km^{2} (442 sq mi)

Basin features
- Progression: Tisza→ Danube→ Black Sea

The Rika (Ukrainian: Ріка) is a right tributary of the river Tisza in the Zakarpattia Oblast, western Ukraine. Its basin covers an area of 1,145 km^{2} (442 sq mi). It rises in the Eastern Carpathians. It flows through the town Mizhhirya and discharges into the Tisza near Khust.
