= Anthora =

Coffee cup design

The Anthora is a design for a disposable paper cup for coffee. The design is known for its association with New York City.

== History ==
The cup was originally designed by Leslie Buck of the Sherri Cup Company in 1963, to appeal to Greek-owned coffee shops in New York City, and was later much copied by other companies. Sherri was later acquired by the Solo Cup Company, which in turn was acquired by Dart Container in 2012. The name is said to come from Buck's Eastern European-accented pronunciation of the word amphora.

Sales of the cup reached 500 million in 1994, and fell to about 200 million cups annually by 2005. One New York Times writer in 1995 called the Anthora "perhaps the most successful cup in history". Solo halted production in 2006, but continued to license the design. By 2007, it was mentioned in passing in a New York Times television review as "one of those endangered artifacts". Production restarted in 2015.

Buck never received royalties from his design, but as a salesman he was well-remunerated for the product's success. When he retired from Sherri Cup Company in 1992, he was presented with 10,000 Anthoras printed with a testimonial inscription. After Buck's death in 2010, a New York Times writer described the motto on the cup as having "welcome intimations of tenderness, succor, and humility".

== Design ==
The original Anthora depicts an image of an Ancient Greek amphora, a Greek key design on the top and bottom rim, and the words "WΣ ARΣ HAPPY TO SΣRVΣ YOU" in angular script intended to evoke ancient Greek epigraphy and using Σ to represent the letter E. There are three steaming cups of coffee below the slogan. The blue and white colors were inspired by the flag of Greece. The original capacity was 10 US fluid ounces (300 ml); 8 ounce versions are also made.

There are also variant knock-offs; a popular one produced by Premier Cup portrays a discus-thrower; others depict the Parthenon, a harpist, and so on, and have variant slogans such as "We Are Pleased To Serve You".

== Culture ==
Front and side view of ceramic Anthora cup, showing the skeuomorphic seam and rounded lip

The Anthora has been displayed in the Design Department of the Museum of Modern Art, in an exhibition at the Clark Art Institute on "The Persistence of Classicism", and in an article on "A History of New York in 50 Objects". It has been featured in various movies and television, where it is used to "evoke Gotham at a glance".

In 2003, Graham Hill of the design group ExceptionLab designed a ceramic replica reproducing the construction of the paper cup as a skeuomorph, converting it from disposable to permanent; it is sold at the Museum of Modern Art shop.

In 2004, NBC commissioned a special edition of the Anthora for the 2004 Summer Olympics, including its peacock logo and the Olympic rings.
