= Khust Raion =

Subdivision of Zakarpattia Oblast, Ukraine

Khust Raion Хустський район
- Raion
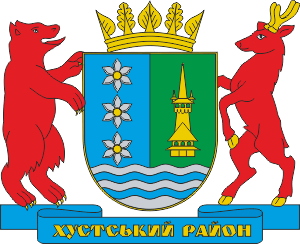
- Flag Coat of arms

- Coordinates: 48°2′53.07″N 23°25′15.8″E
- Country: Ukraine
- Oblast: Zakarpattia Oblast
- Admin. center: Khust
- Subdivisions: 13 hromadas

Area
  - Total: 3,180 km^{2} (1,230 sq mi)

Population (2022)
  - Total: 265,845
  - Density: 83.6/km^{2} (217/sq mi)
- Time zone: UTC+02:00 (EET)
  - Summer (DST): UTC+03:00 (EEST)
- Area code: 380-3142
- Website: khust-rda.gov.ua

Khust Raion (Ukrainian: Хустський район; Hungarian: Huszti járás) is a raion (district) in Zakarpattia Oblast in western Ukraine. Its administrative center is Khust. Population: 265,845 (2022 estimate).

On 18 July 2020, as part of the administrative reform of Ukraine, the number of raions of Zakarpattia Oblast was reduced to six, and the area of Khust Raion was significantly expanded. The January 2020 estimate of the raion population was 95,195 (2020 est.).

== History ==
In the area there are unique wooden churches in the villages of Danylovo, Kraynikovo, Sokirnytsia, and Oleksandrivka; in addition, there are several monasteries: a female Orthodox in the villages of Dragovo-Zabrod, a female Orthodox in the village of Lipcha, a male Orthodox in the village of Iza, a male in Khust-Gorodilovo, and a male Orthodox in Khust-Kolesarovo.

There are two medieval castles in the area, which were constructed when the territory belonged to the Kingdom of Hungary: Khust Castle and the Vyshkovsky castle (Hungarian: Huszt and Visk, respectively). In 1191, the Hungarian kings finished building a fortress, the construction of which took more than a hundred years. In 1570, the castle was transferred to the Transylvanian principality. In 1709, an all the Transylvanian Diet of Francis II Rákóczi's supporters was held in the castle. In 1766, during a major thunderstorm over Khust, lightning struck the castle's powder tower and lit it, causing much of the fortress to be destroyed.

Remains of Vyshkiv Castle - the first mention of the fort dates to the end of the 13th century. (1281), when brothers Mikó and Csépán of the Hont-Pázmány kindred on the lands donated to them by the Hungarian king Ladislaus IV built an earthen fort on Mount Var-Ged (height 589 m). It acted as the protection of the Tisza waterway, along which rock salt was coming from salt-pans. From 1300 to 1350 the fortress was the center of the Máramaros County.

In 1874 Khust inventor A. Yenkovsky from Steblyvky village invented a machine for mechanized wheat harvesting, which was later patented in the US as a combine harvester.

After the collapse of Austria-Hungary in the fall of 1918 many Transcarpathians expressed their desire to join Ukraine, and this was clearly stated at the congress in the small town of Khust, January 21, 1919.

On March 15, 1939. It was proclaimed a new state formation - Carpathian Ukraine with a center in the city of Khust, and its first president was Augustine Voloshin. This state did not last long, as it was soon occupied and annexed by Hungary. In 1941, the Hungarian state, which included Transcarpathia, entered the Second World War.

The raion consists of 13 Hormadas:

== Hormadas ==
- Khust urban hromada
- Irshava Urban Hromada
- Mizhhirya Settlement Hromada
- Vyshkovo Settlement Hromada
- Bilky Rural Hromada
- Dovhe Rural Hromada
- Drachovo Rural Hromada
- Horinchovo Rural Hromada
- Keretsky Rural Hromada
- Kolochava Rural Hromada
- Pylypets Rural Hromada
- Synevyr Rural Hromada
- Zarichchya Rural Hromada

== Buildings ==
- Protection of the Theotokos Church in Ilnytsia

== See also ==
- Administrative divisions of Zakarpattia Oblast
- Carpathian wooden churches
