= Carpathian wooden churches =

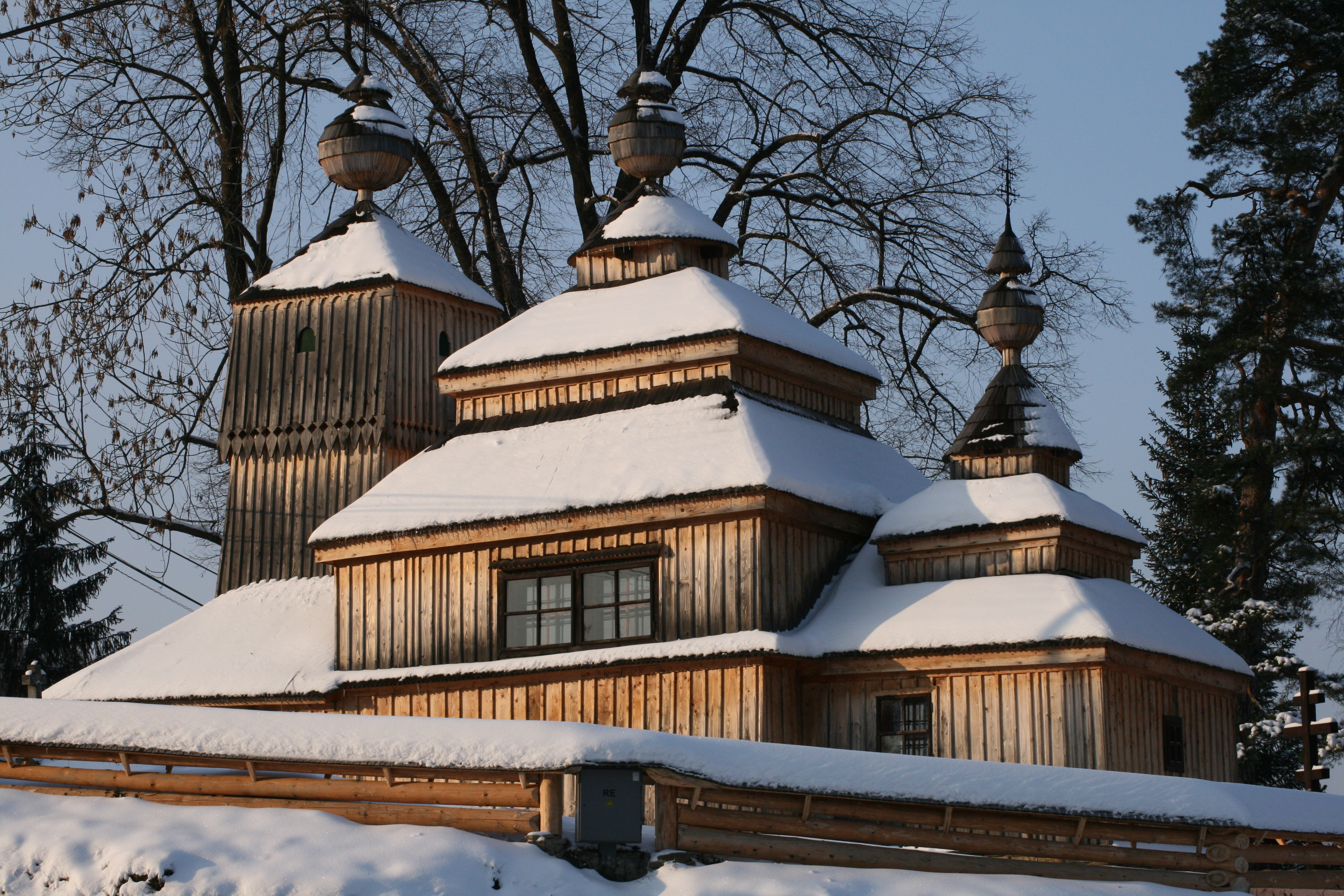
This wooden church in Bodružal in Slovakia is an example of Rusyn folk architecture and is a UNESCO World Heritage Site.

Carpathian Wooden Churches are religious structures made of wood and built in the Vernacular architecture of the Carpathians. These occur in the following areas:

- Wooden Churches of Southern Lesser Poland
- Wooden Churches of Maramureș in Romania
- Wooden Churches of Ukraine
- Wooden Churches of the Slovak Carpathians
- Wooden tserkvas of the Carpathian region in Poland and Ukraine
