= Khust =

City in Zakarpattia Oblast, Ukraine

Khust Хуст
- City
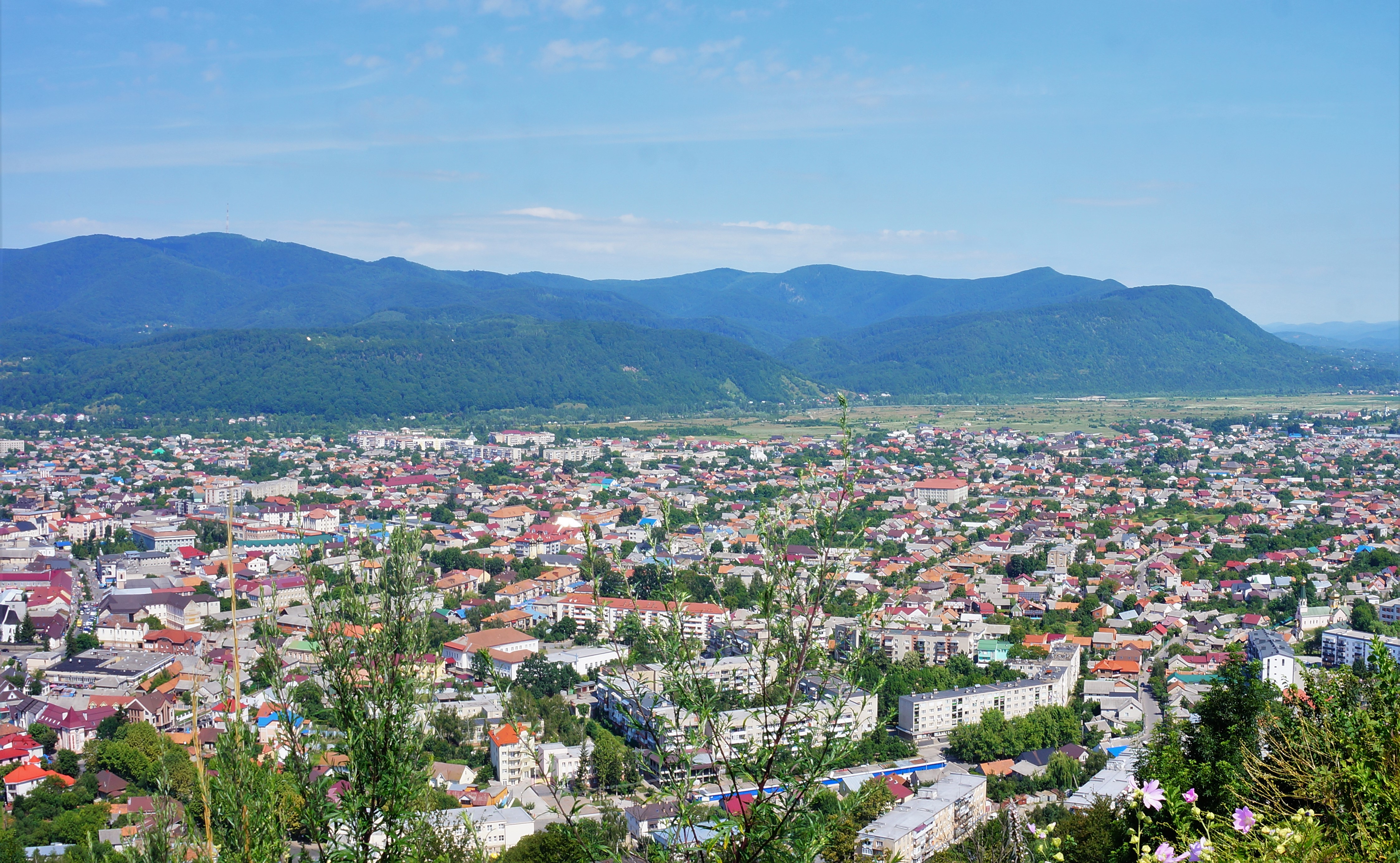
- Panorama of Khust from the Castle Hill

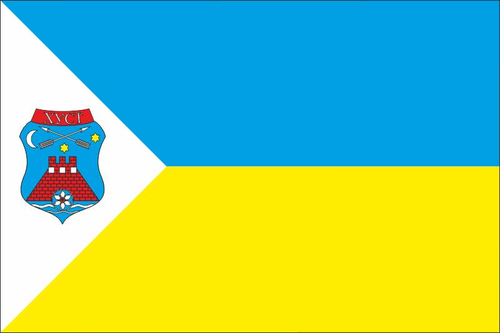
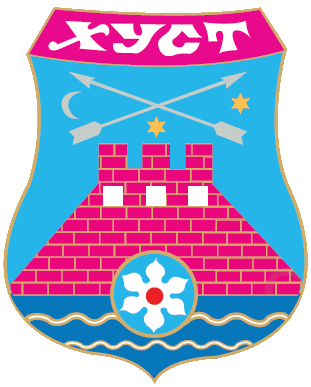
- Flag Coat of arms

- Location of Khust Khust (Ukraine)
- Coordinates: 48°10′53″N 23°17′52″E
- Country: Ukraine
- Oblast: Zakarpattia Oblast
- Raion: Khust Raion
- Hromada: Khust urban hromada
- Founded: 1090
- Incorporated: 1324

Area
  - City: 22 km^{2} (8.5 sq mi)
- Elevation: 164 m (538 ft)

Population (2022)
  - City: 28,321
  - Density: 1,300/km^{2} (3,300/sq mi)
  - Metro: 31,864
- Time zone: UTC+1 (CET)
  - Summer (DST): UTC+2 (CEST)
- Postal code: 90400
- Area code: +380-3142
- Climate: Dfb
- Website: Official Website

Khust (Note: Ukrainian: Хуст, IPA: [xust]; Russian: Хуст; Hungarian: Huszt; German: Chust; Romanian: Hust; Yiddish: חוסט, romanized: Khist.) is a city located on the Khustets River in Zakarpattia Oblast, western Ukraine. It is near the сonfluence of the Tisa and Rika Rivers. It serves as the administrative center of Khust Raion. Population: 28,039 (2022 estimate).

Khust was the capital of the short-lived republic of Carpatho-Ukraine.

== Etymology ==
The name is most possibly related to the name of the stream Hustets or Husztica, which means "kerchief". It is also conceivable that the name of the city comes from a Romanian traditional food ingredient – husti.

There are several alternative names used for this city: Ukrainian: Хуст, Romanian: Hust, Hungarian: Huszt, Czech/Slovak: Chust, Yiddish: כוסט / Khist, German: Chust.

== History ==
The settlement was first mentioned as terra Huzth, in 1324. Its castle, supposed to be built in 1090 by the king St. Ladislaus of Hungary as a defence against the Cumans and destroyed during the Mongol invasion of Hungary, was mentioned in 1353. The town got privileges in 1329.

In 1458 King Matthias imprisoned his uncle, the rebellious Mihály Szilágyi, in the castle. In 1514, during György Dózsa's peasant revolt local peasants captured the castle. In 1526 the area became a part of Transylvania.

The army of Ferdinand I captured the town in 1546. In 1594, the Tartars destroyed the town, but could not take the castle. The castle was besieged in 1644 by the army of George I Rákóczi, in 1657 by the Polish, and in 1661–62 by the Ottoman and Tartar hordes. Count Ferenc Rhédey, the ruling prince of Transylvania and high steward of Máramaros County died in the castle on 13 May 1667.

The castle surrendered to the Kurucs on 17 August 1703, and the independence of Transylvania was proclaimed here. It was the last castle the Habsburgs occupied when suppressing the freedom fight of the Kurucs, in 1711. The seriously damaged castle was struck by lightning and burnt down on 3 July 1766; a storm brought down its tower in 1798, it has been in ruins ever since then. Khust was renamed as Csebreny in 1882 during Magyarisation process. In 1861, Rabbi Moshe Schick established what was, at that time, the largest yeshiva in the world, with over 800 students.

In 1910 Khust had 10,292 citizens, 5,230 Ukrainians, 3,505 Hungarians and 1,535 Germans.

During World War I, a camp for Russian army prisoners of war was established in Khust. A monument to the dead of the first period of the war was constructed near the Castle. By 1919, the Soviets had established leadership of the region and the Hungarian Soviet Republic was proclaimed. On 18 April 1919, all of Zakarpattia was captured by Romanian troops and transferred to Czechoslovakia under the Treaty of Trianon.

After World War I, in summer 1919 the Romanian troops took over the territory. But according to the St.-Germain treaty Czechoslovakia received the city, as part of newly formed Podkarpatsko ("under the Carpathians") region (Subcarpathia). Czechoslovakia had to provide the region a wide autonomy, but autonomy was realised only in 1938. In Autumn 1938 an autonomous government was organized. The day after the collapse of Czechoslovakia on 14 March 1939, the Khust city government proclaimed, by the will of the local population and under the leadership of Avgustyn Voloshyn, independence as Carpathian Ukraine on 15 March 1939. The next day, 16 March 1939, Hungarian troops invaded Khust and claimed it as part of Hungary. On 24 October 1944 Soviet troops occupied the city, and annexed it into the Soviet Union. The Soviet government deported much of the city's German and Hungarian populations.

=== WWII and the Holocaust ===
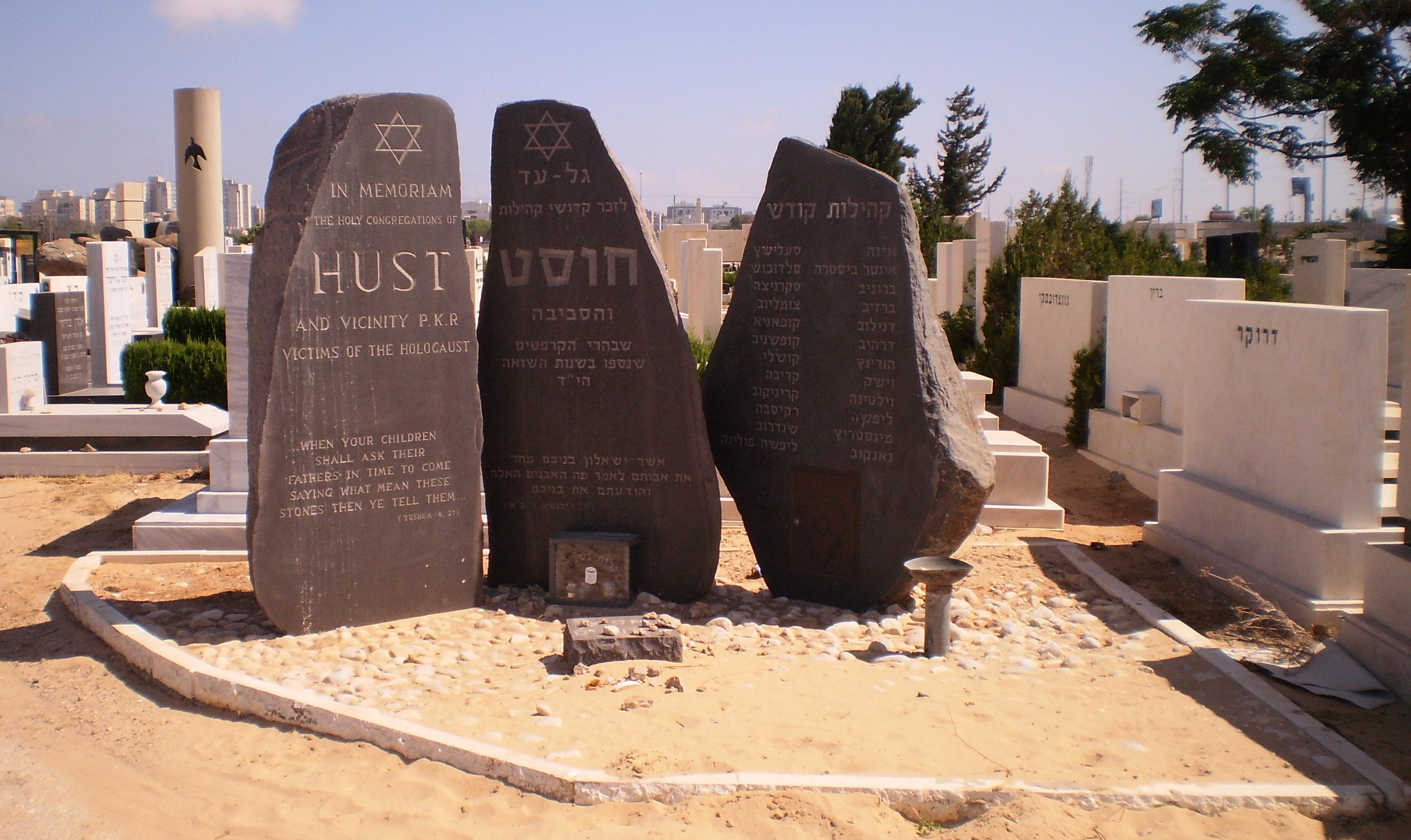
Holocaust Victims Memorial (Holon, Israel)

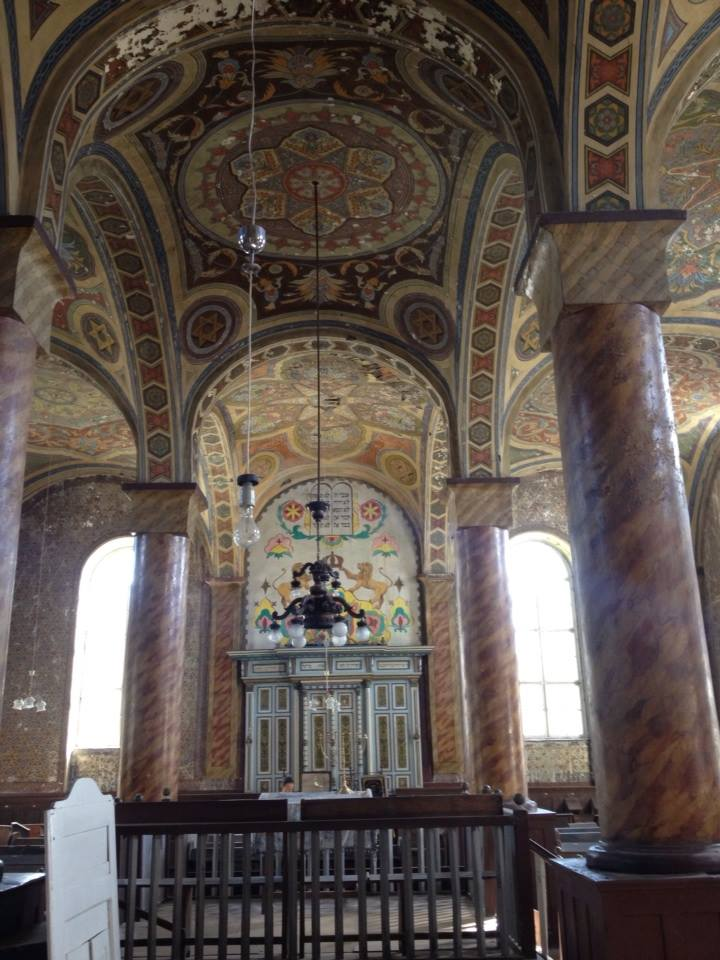
Interior of the Khust Synagogue

Prior to 1939, Jews thrived in Khust and owned many businesses. When the city became part of Hungary in March 1939 again, many Jewish citizens were forced into labour camps. A ghetto was established, and Jews from other regions were forced to live there. Additional ghettos were established nearby in Iza and Szeklence (now Sokyrnytsia, Ukraine). By April 1944, most Jewish residents were killed at Auschwitz. Prior to the war, there were 8 synagogues in the city. One survives and is in use today.

== Demographics ==
In 2001 it had 31,900 inhabitants, including 28,500 Ukrainians, 1,700 Hungarians, 1,200 Rusyns and 100 Roma. The exact ethnic composition was as follows:

Ethnic groups in Khust
	percent
Ukrainians	89.27%
Hungarians	5.42%
Russians	3.66%
Gypsies	0.38%
Germans	0.26%
Belarusians	0.16%
Slovaks	0.14%
Ashkenazi Jews	0.14%
Poles	0.07%

Until the 19th century, the city's population also included ethnic Romanians (800 Romanians according to the 1880 census).

== Geography ==
=== Climate ===
Khust has an oceanic climate (Köppen: Cfb).

Climate data for Khust
Month	Jan	Feb	Mar	Apr	May	Jun	Jul	Aug	Sep	Oct	Nov	Dec	Year
Daily mean °C (°F)	−2.8 (27.0)	−0.6 (30.9)	4.4 (39.9)	10.2 (50.4)	15.1 (59.2)	18.0 (64.4)	19.6 (67.3)	19.2 (66.6)	15.3 (59.5)	10.1 (50.2)	4.3 (39.7)	−0.1 (31.8)	9.4 (48.9)
Average precipitation mm (inches)	47 (1.9)	41 (1.6)	41 (1.6)	50 (2.0)	74 (2.9)	93 (3.7)	80 (3.1)	72 (2.8)	48 (1.9)	45 (1.8)	52 (2.0)	62 (2.4)	705 (27.7)
Source: Climate-Data.org

== Tourist sights ==
- Ruins of the Khust Castle
- Protestant fortress church 13th–14th century, Protestant since 1524, fortified in 1616, 1644, 1661 and 1670, restored in 1773 and 1888. Its belfry is from the 15th century; until 1861 it had four pinnacles.
- Roman Catholic church (Baroque, 18th century)
- Greek Orthodox church (18th century)
- St Elizabeth's church, built in 1526

== Notable people ==
- Jenő Benda, writer, and journalist was born here in 1882.
- Leslie Buck (born Laszlo Büch), American business executive and Holocaust survivor, designer of the Anthora coffee cup, was born in Khust in 1922.
- Myroslav Dochynets, a Ukrainian writer was born here in 1959.
- Jaromír Hořec, Czech poet, writer and journalist was born here in 1921.
- József Koller, historian of religion was born here in 1745.
- Antonín Moskalyk, a Czech film director, was born here in 1930.
- Ernő Szép, a writer, was born here in 1894.
- Count József Teleki, a scientist was born here on December 21, 1738.
- Rabbi Zeev ben Moshe Feuerlicht (born 1918), studied in yeshiva of Satu-Mare Rebbe, Romania, during the Liberation of Czechoslovakia from Nazi Germany he joined as an active fighter the Gen. Ludvík Svoboda Army, served in Prague synagogue Alt-neu Shul as a Rabbi, educator and shochet. Rabbi Feuerlicht, together with Rabbi Karol Efraim Sidon, is credited for the survival of the Jewish Orthodox community in Czechoslovakia after WWII.
- Rachel Ta-Shma, scientist and educator at Hebrew University, Jerusalem
- Eugene Hollander, Hungarian Holocaust survivor and author of From the Hell of the Holocaust: A Survivor's Story

== Gallery ==
Monument at the entrance to the city

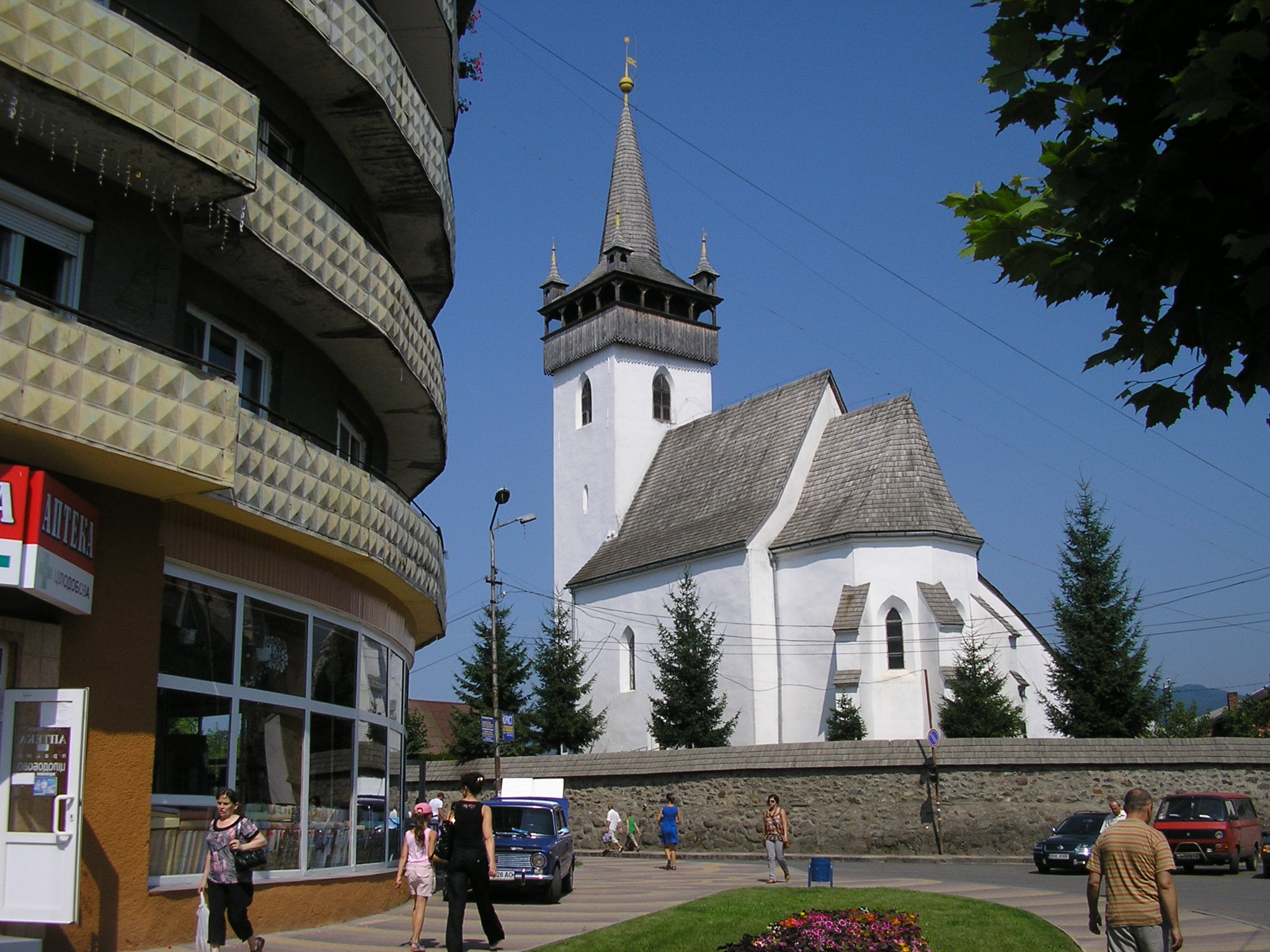
Gothic Reformed Fortress Church 13th Century

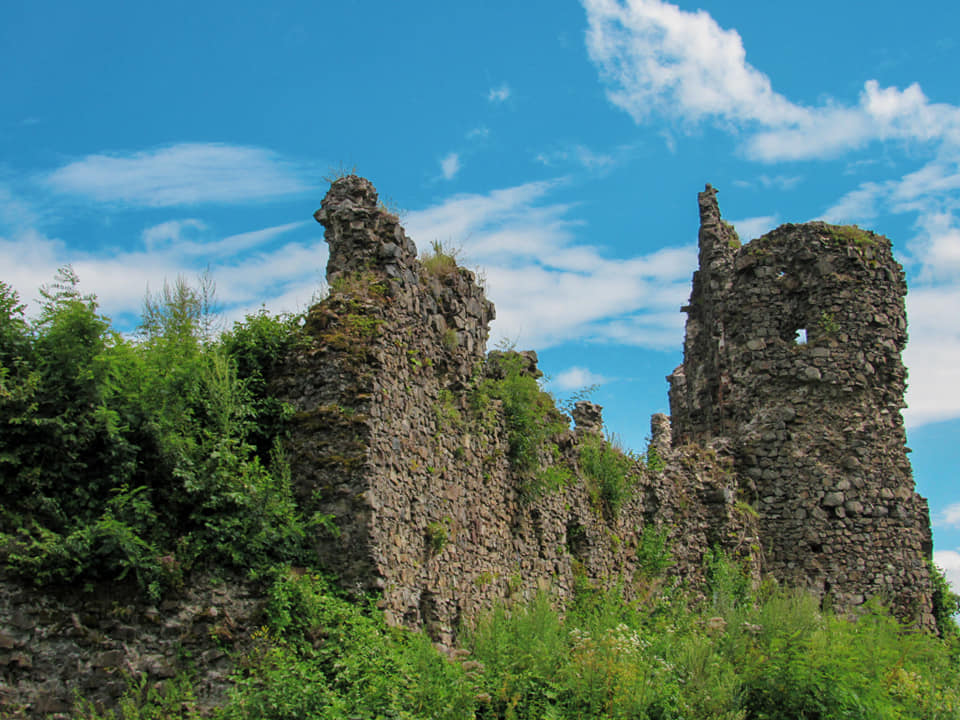
Castle ruins

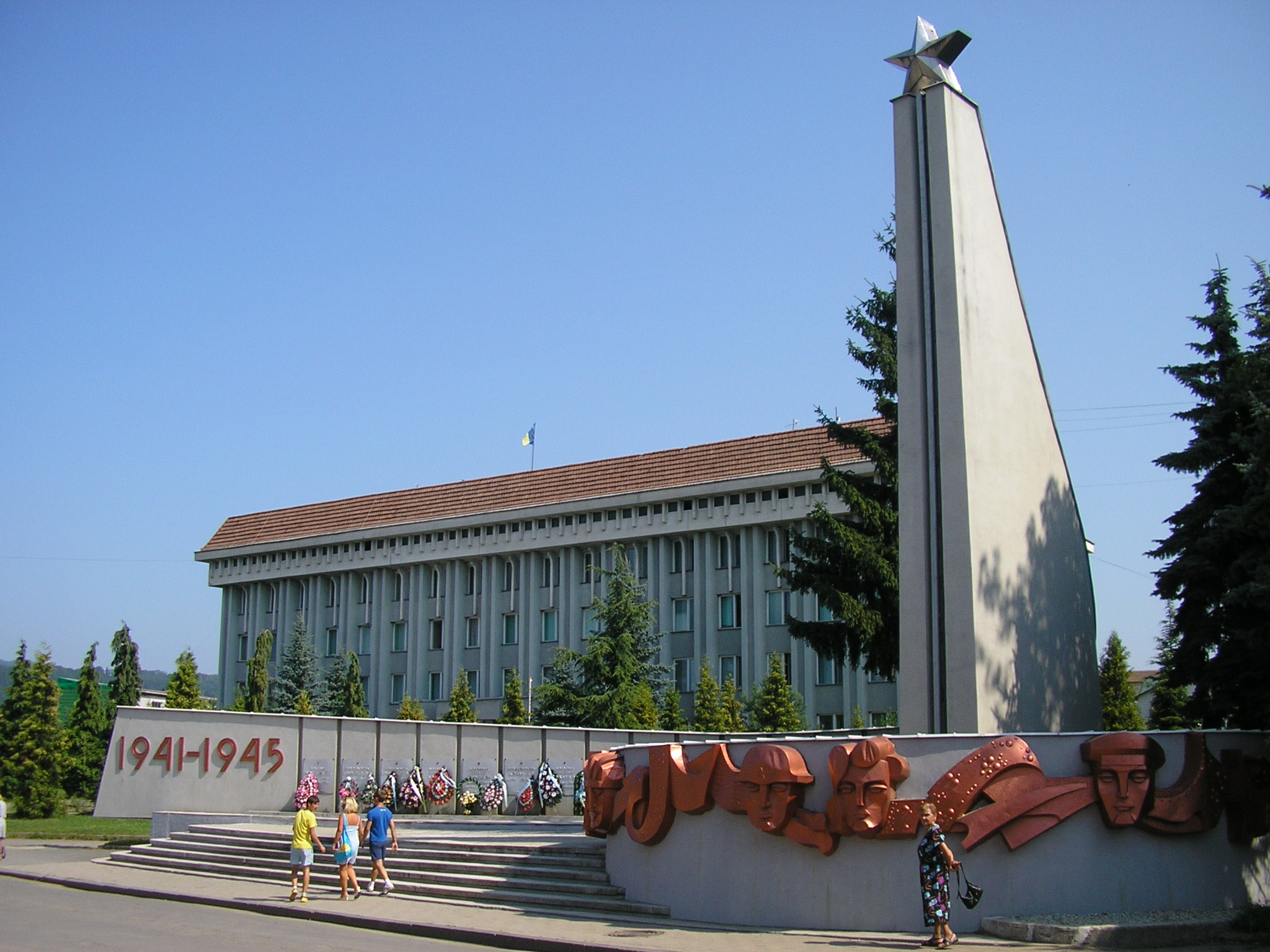
War memorial

== See also ==
- Zakarpattia Oblast
- History of the Jews in Carpathian Ruthenia
