= Khust Castle =

Coordinates: 48°10′05″N 23°18′05″E

- Khust, Zakarpattia Oblast, Ukraine
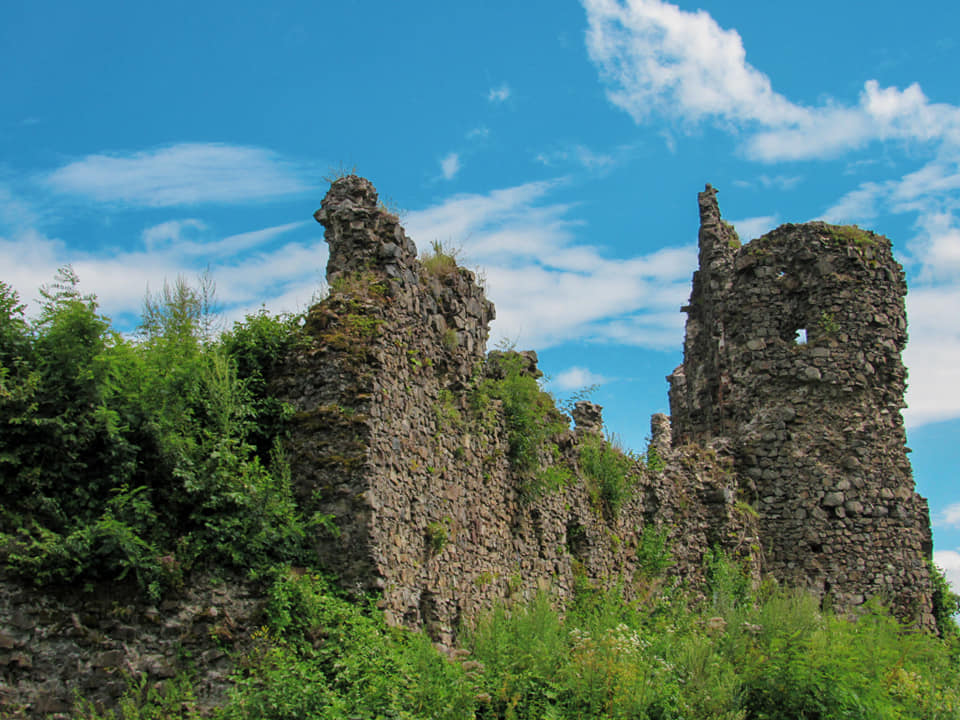
- View of the ruins

Site information
- Type: Castle
- Condition: Ruins

Location
- Map of Zakarpattia Oblast with Khust.
- Location within Zakarpattia Oblast Location within Ukraine

Site history
- Built: 11th–12th centuries (hypothesis); 1353 (first written mention)

The Khust Castle (Ukrainian: Хустський замок, romanized: Khusts'kyj zamok; Hungarian: Huszti vár) is an abandoned castle located in the city of Khust in Zakarpattia Oblast (province) in western Ukraine.

The former Hungarian castle lies on a 150-meter high mountain near the center of the city. It is widely believed that the construction of the castle had started around 1090, during the reign of the Hungarian King St. Ladislaus I, and had finished in 1191, under Béla III. However, the first written mention of the castle dates back to 1353, and a 2019 archaeological expedition dated the oldest findings to late 15th century.

The castle was built as a fortress to protect the salt road from Solotvyno, including the Khust Gate, and the border areas.

A Turkish traveler Evliya Çelebi mentions the castle: "The Khust castle is located at the top of Mount Hassan. Its walls are high and thick, and with its power it is similar to the Iskander fortress, because its height already reaches the sky. Residential buildings facing east face one above the other. The roofs of the palaces are covered with colored tiles, the roofs of the churches – iron, the crosses on them – of pure gold and so shine that the one who looks at them gets tired eyes and is forced, with respect for them, to lower their gaze."

After the defeat of the Hungarian army in the Battle of Mohács in 1526, The Kingdom of Hungary fell apart and the castle in Khust became a part of the Principality of Transylvania.

== History ==
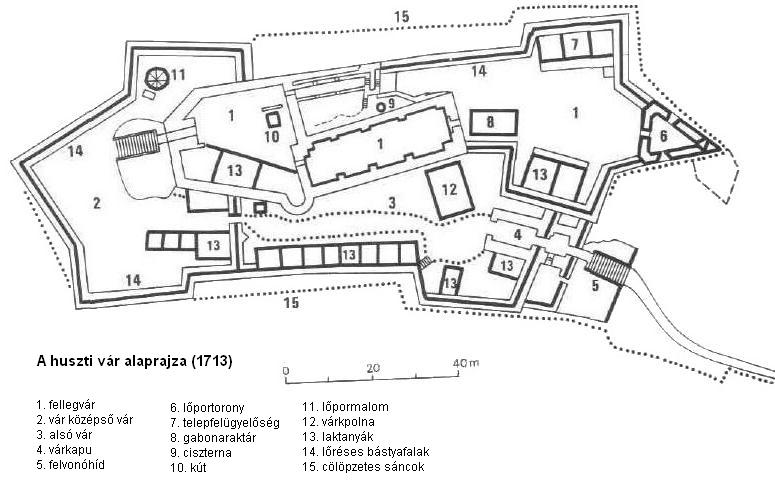

Khust Castle was built on a mountain of volcanic origin. If it existed in 11th–12th centuries, the fort belonged to the Principality of Galicia–Volhynia in 1281–1321. A small fort in mid-14th century, the Khust Castle was significantly rebuilt and expanded in the 15th century. In 1480, Matthias Corvinus of Hungary gave the castle to his wife, Queen Beatrice of Aragon. In 1511, Vladislaus II leased Khust Castle with all his possessions for rent to Gábor Perényi for 20,000 gold. In 1669 the commandant of the castle, Mihály Katona, made his inventory, which included 50 guns, several tons of gunpowder, 3,000 cores in 3 warehouses. In 1709, Transylvanian Diet of the supporters of Prince Francis II Rákóczi took place in the castle.

In the 16–17th centuries, Khust and his castle were often fought by the Habsburgs and the princes of Seven, attacked by the Turks and Tatars. The last combat performance of Khust garrison took place in 1717, when soldiers attacked a 12,000 Tatar horde near Vyshkovo.

The castle was destroyed by lightning strikes during a storm – one of them in 1766 fell into powder warehouses. Although the mayor tried to keep the castle and started repairing it, his attempts were unsuccessful. In 1773, Empress Maria Theresa sent her son Joseph to inspect the castle. He ordered the garrison to be transferred to Mukachevo.

In 1798 a storm damaged the last tower of the castle. Authorities gave the local community permission to dismantle the castle on the building stones. In 1799, the eastern wall of the castle was demolished for the construction of the Catholic Church and various official buildings in Khust.

The Hungarian poet Ferenc Kölcsey wrote the epigram Huszt about the ruins of the castle in 1831.

== Today ==
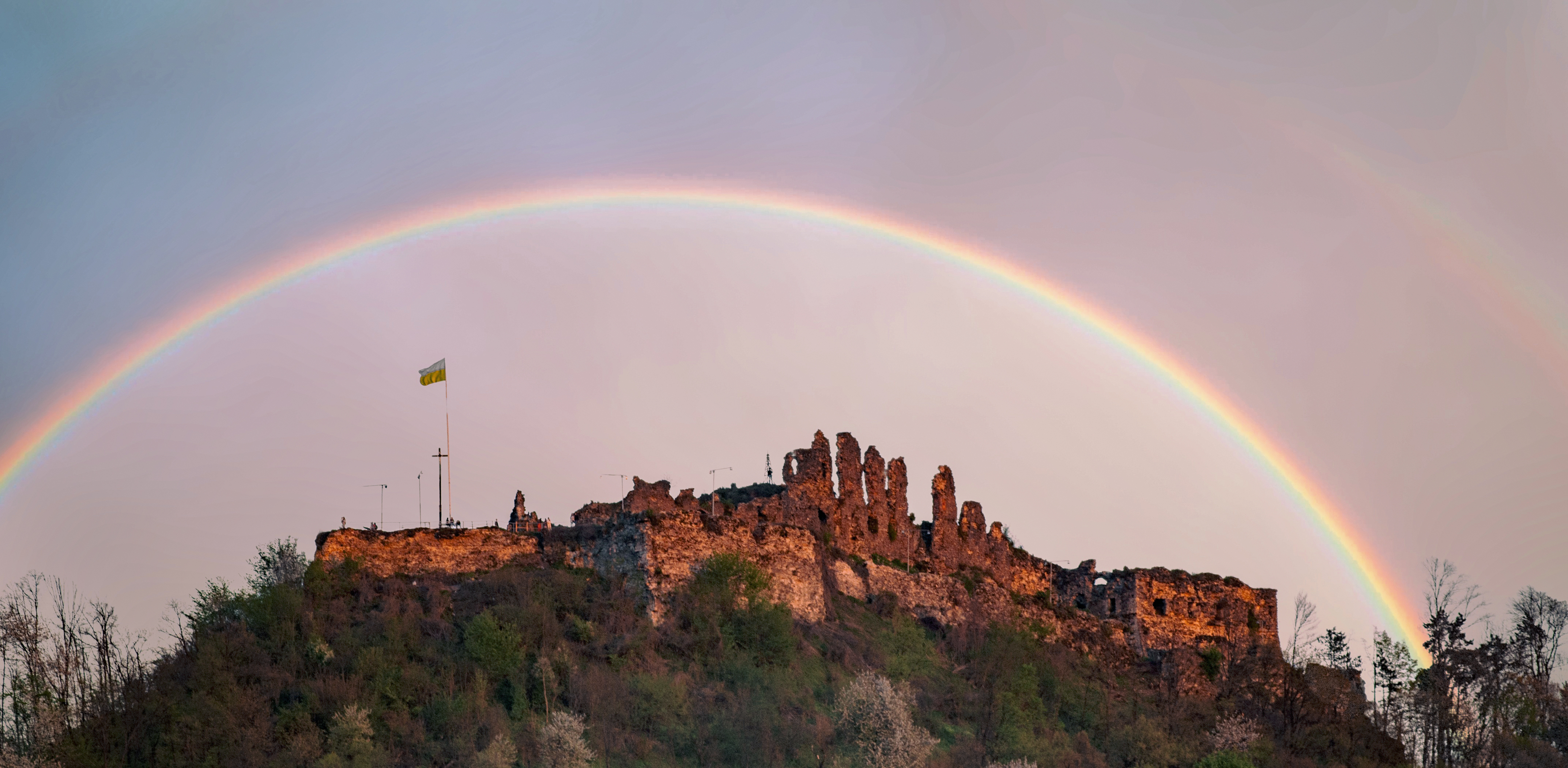
Castle today

Only ruins remain. It is possible to walk to the castle from Khust via an uphill trail that starts near the park on the south edge of the city. The trail begins with flat cobbles and transitions to dirt near the top. It is a 25-minute walk from the center of Khust to the top of the hill. The castle hill offers views of Khust and the surrounding area.
