= Hungarian Soviet War =

The Hungarian Soviet war may refer to:

- Hungary in World War II#Invasion of the Soviet Union (1941)
- The Hungarian Revolution of 1956

== See also ==
- Hungary–Soviet Union relations
