= Hungarians in Ukraine =

Ethnic group in Ukraine

Total population
- 156,600 (2001)

Regions with significant populations
- Zakarpattia Oblast

Languages
- Predominantly Hungarian (95.4%), Russian, Ukrainian, other

Religion
- Protestantism, Catholicism, Eastern Orthodoxy

Related ethnic groups
- Ukrainians in Hungary and Hungarian diaspora

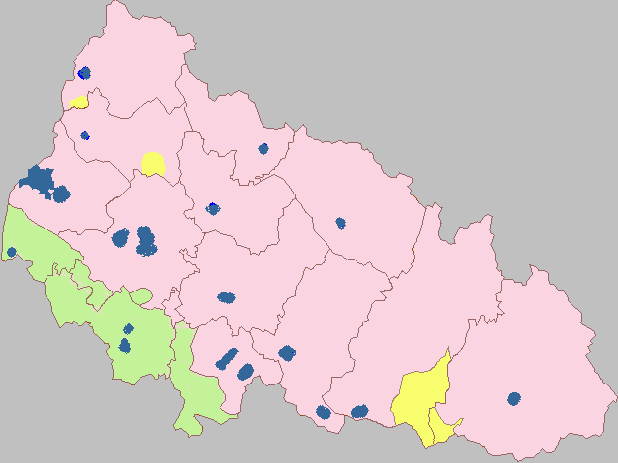
Ethnic map of Zakarpattia Oblast in 2001 Ukrainians (incl. Rusyns) Hungarians Romanians mixed Ukrainians (incl. Rusyns) and Russians

Hungarians in Ukraine (Note: Ukrainian: угорці в Україні, tr. uhortsi v Ukraini) numbered 156,600 people according to the Ukrainian census of 2001, representing the third largest national minority in the country.

Hungarians are primarily concentrated in the region (oblast) of Zakarpattia, (Note: Hungarian: Kárpátalja) which is also known as Transcarpathia. Hungarians living in this region are referred to as Transcarpathian Hungarians. (Note: Hungarian: Kárpátaljai magyarok) Transcarpathian Hungarians constitute 12.1% of the region's population, and are a majority in areas along the Hungary–Ukraine border.

== History of Transcarpathia ==
The region of Transcarpathia was part of Hungary since the Hungarian conquest of the Carpathian Basin in the end of the 9th century to 1918. Historically it was one of the Lands of the Hungarian Crown before it was detached from the Kingdom of Hungary and provisionally attached to the newly created Czechoslovakia in 1918, following the disintegration of Austria-Hungary as a result of World War I. This was later confirmed by the Treaty of Trianon in 1920.

Transcarpathia was briefly part of the short-lived West Ukrainian People's Republic in 1918 and occupied by the Kingdom of Romania at end of that year. It was later recaptured by Hungary in the summer of 1919. After the defeat of the remaining Hungarian armies in 1919, the Paris Peace Conference concluded the Treaty of Trianon that awarded the region to the newly formed Czechoslovakia as the Subcarpathian Rus, one of the four main regions of Czechoslovakia, the others being Bohemia, Moravia and Slovakia.

Hungary had sought to restore its historical borders and the revision of the Treaty of Trianon. On 2 November 1938, the First Vienna Award separated territories from Czechoslovakia, including the southern Carpathian Rus' that were mostly Hungarian-populated and returned them to Hungary.

The remaining portion was constituted as an autonomous region of the short-lived Second Czechoslovak Republic. After the German occupation of Bohemia and Moravia on 15 March 1939, and the Slovak declaration of an independent state, Ruthenia declared independence as the Republic of Carpatho-Ukraine.

The Hungarian Teleki government and Miklós Horthy were informed by Adolf Hitler on 12 March 1939 that they had 24 hours to resolve the Ruthenian question. Hungary responded immediately with the military occupation of the entire Carpathian Ruthenia. As a result of the annexation, Hungary gained a territory with 552,000 inhabitants, 70.6% of whom were Ruthenian, 12.5% Hungarian, and 12% were Carpathian Germans.

The region remained under Hungarian control until the end of World War II in Europe, after which it was occupied and annexed by the Soviet Union. Hungary had to renounce the territories awarded in the Vienna Awards in an armistice agreement signed in Moscow on 20 January 1945. The renunciation was reconfirmed at the Paris Peace Conference in 1946 and recorded in the Peace Treaty of 1947.

When the Soviet Army crossed the pre-1938 borders of Czechoslovakia in 1944, Soviet authorities refused to allow Czechoslovak governmental officials to resume control over Transcarpathia. In June 1945, Czechoslovak president Edvard Beneš formally signed a treaty ceding the area to the Soviet Union. It was then incorporated into Soviet Ukraine as the Zakarpattia region (oblast). After the breakup of the Soviet Union in 1991, it became part of independent Ukraine.

== Situation of Hungarians in independent Ukraine ==
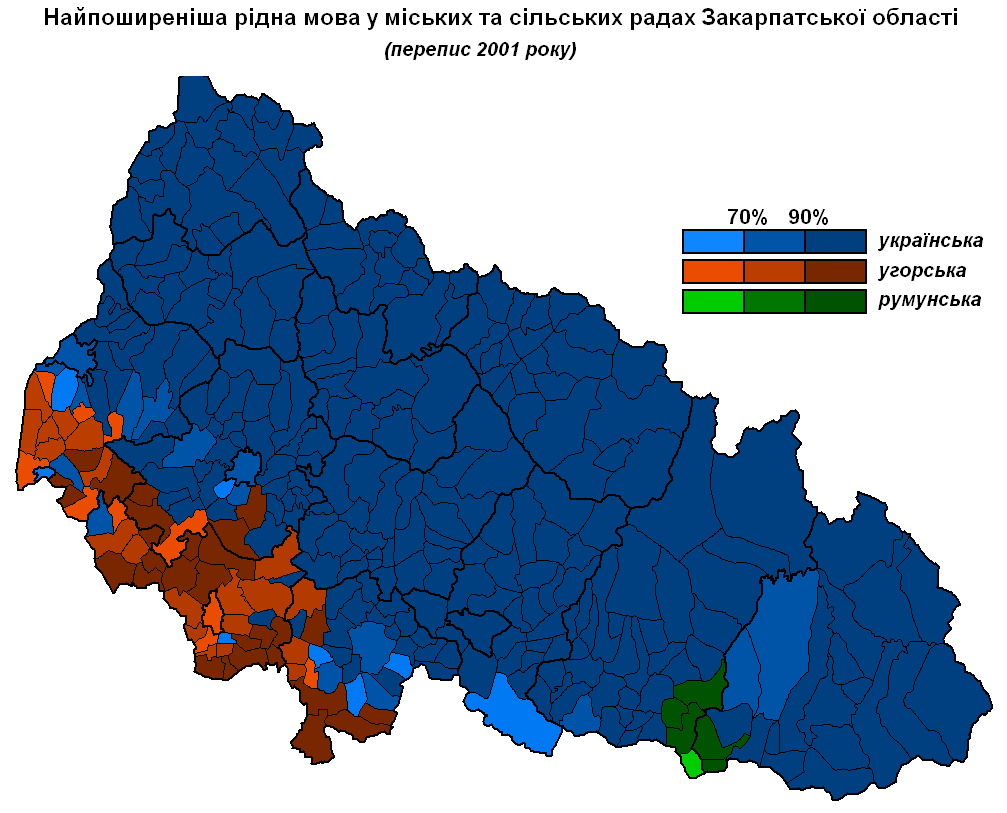
Most common mother tongue and its prevalence by urban and rural district in Zakarpattia Oblast, 2001 census

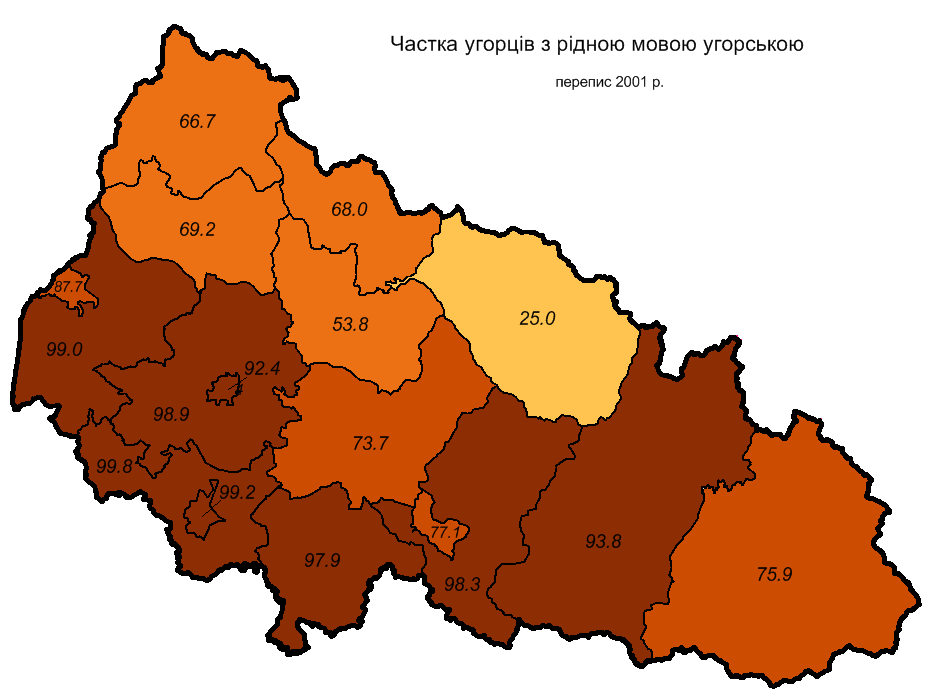
Percentage of Hungarians who called their native language Hungarian in Zakarpattia Oblast by the 2001 census

Hungary was the first country to recognize Ukraine's independence. Árpád Göncz, who was president of Hungary at the time, was invited to visit the region, and a joint declaration, followed in December 1991 by a state treaty, acknowledged that the ethnic Hungarian minority had collective as well as individual rights. The treaty provided for the preservation of their ethnic, cultural, linguistic, and religious identities; education at all levels in the mother tongue; and the ethnic Hungarians' participation in local authorities charged with minority affairs.

It is quite common among the Hungarian minority in Ukraine to hold both Ukrainian citizenship and Hungarian citizenship, although currently Ukrainian law does not recognise dual citizenship.

In the 2014 European Parliament election in Hungary, Andrea Bocskor, a resident of Berehove, Ukraine, was elected to the European Parliament as a member of the Hungarian political party Fidesz. Hence, Bocskor, who is ethnically Hungarian and a Hungarian citizen, became the first elected member of the European Parliament who holds a Ukrainian passport.

Relations between Hungary and Ukraine rapidly deteriorated over the issue of Ukraine's 2017 education law, which made Ukrainian the required language of primary education in state schools from grade five. Hungary has since continued to block Ukraine's attempt to integrate into the European Union and NATO, over disputes on minority rights.

In February 2024, it was reported that the ongoing war with Russia has led to the depopulation of several ethnic Hungarian villages in Ukraine.

In July 2025, Hungary imposed an entry ban on Ukrainian military officials amid a diplomatic dispute caused by the death of a dual Hungarian-Ukrainian citizen under disputed circumstances following his mobilization into the Ukrainian military.

== Minority rights ==
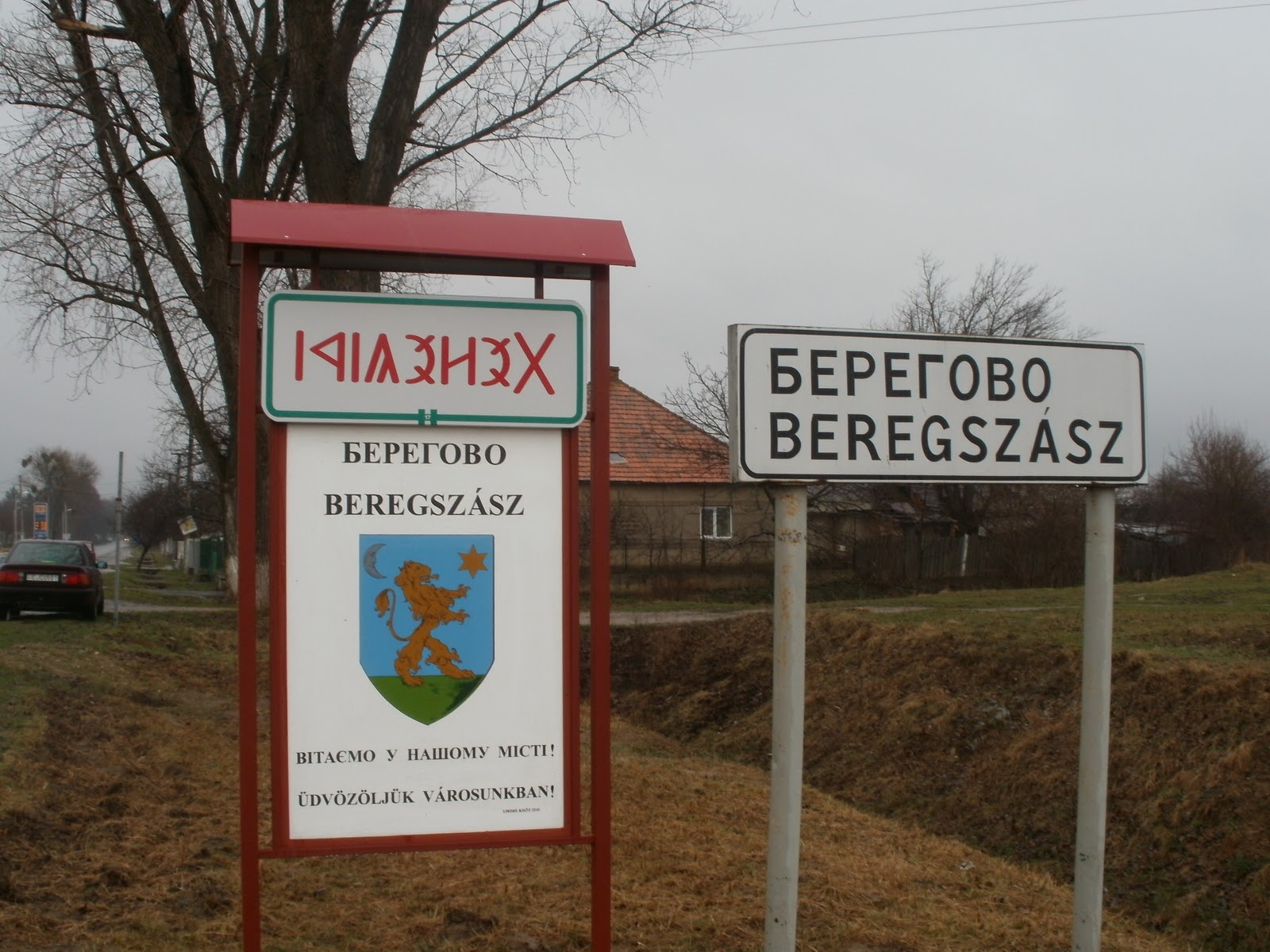
Signs in Hungarian language in Berehove, Ukraine

Residents in seven of Mukachevo Raion's villages have the option to learn the Hungarian language in a school or home school environment. The first Hungarian College in Ukraine is in Berehovo, the II. Rákoczi Ferenc College.

In 2017 a new education law made Ukrainian the required language of primary education in state schools from grade five. This led to a rapid deterioration of Hungary–Ukraine relations over this issue. Hungary continues to block Ukraine's attempt to integrate within the EU and NATO over disputes on minority rights. László Brenzovics, at the time (Note: In the 2019 Ukrainian parliamentary election László Brenzovics failed to get re-elected into the Verkhovna Rada (Ukraine's national parliament).) the only ethnic Hungarian in the Verkhovna Rada (Ukraine's national parliament), said that "There is a sort of purposeful policy, which besides narrowing the rights of all minorities, tries to portray the Hungarian minority as the enemy in Ukrainian public opinion."

In 2017 there were 71 Hungarian schools in Ukraine with 16,000 enrolled students.

In 2019 there were 72 secondary education Hungarian schools in Ukraine with 13,247 students plus 26 (secondary education) schools with mixed Ukrainian language/Hungarian language education. All of them were located in Zakarpattia Oblast.

In January 2020 the 2017 Ukrainian education law was changed and made it legal to teach "one or more disciplines" in "two or more languages – in the official state language, in English, in another official languages of the European Union". All not state funded schools were made free to choose their own language of instruction. This policy change did not improve Hungary–Ukraine relations and Hungarian minority groups in Ukraine also continued to be unsatisfied and demanded the whole 2017 law to be abolished. According to the 2020 law until the fifth year of education all lessons can be completely taught in the minority language without mandatory teaching of subjects in Ukrainian. In the fifth year not less than 20% of the lessons must be taught in Ukrainian. Then every year the volume of teaching in the state language (Ukrainian) should increase, reaching 40% in the ninth grade. In the twelfth and final year at least 60% of education should be taught in Ukrainian.

The 2017 language education law stipulated a 3-year transitional period to come in full effect. In February 2018, this period was extended until 2023. In June 2023 this period was again extended to September 2024.

In late 2022 the Language ombudsman reported that most of the 108 schools in Berehove Raion had classes with the Hungarian language of instruction alongside Ukrainian, but in 37 of them no class had been formed in which the training took place only in Ukrainian.

The general manager of the Hungarian State Opera, Szilveszter Ókovács, claimed in a February 2023 letter published in The Guardian "in today’s Ukraine it is forbidden to use the Hungarian language today."

== Organisation ==
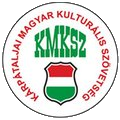
Logo of KMKSZ

The Hungarian Democratic Federation in Ukraine (UMDSZ) is the only nationally registered Hungarian organization. It was established in October 1991 by the Hungarian Cultural Federation in Transcarpathia (KMKSZ, which has suspended its membership since 1995), the Cultural Federation of Hungarians in Lviv, and the Association of Hungarians in Kyiv. The Hungarian Cultural Federation in Transcarpathia is associated with the political party KMKSZ – Hungarian Party in Ukraine, which was established in February 2005. In March 2005, the Ukrainian Ministry of Justice also registered the Hungarian Democratic Party in Ukraine upon the initiative of the UMDSZ. Also Zoltán Lengyel was elected as mayor of Mukachevo after the election on 1 December 2008. UMDSZ also won city municipalities of Berehove, Vynohradiv and Tiachiv in this election.

== Notable personalities ==
- Yozhef Sabo (József Szabó)
- Vasyl Rats (László Rácz)
- Ishtvan Sekech (István Szekecs)
- Yuriy Habovda
- Ernest Kesler (Ernő Keszler)
- Robert Hehedosh
- Robert Brovdi

== Demographics ==
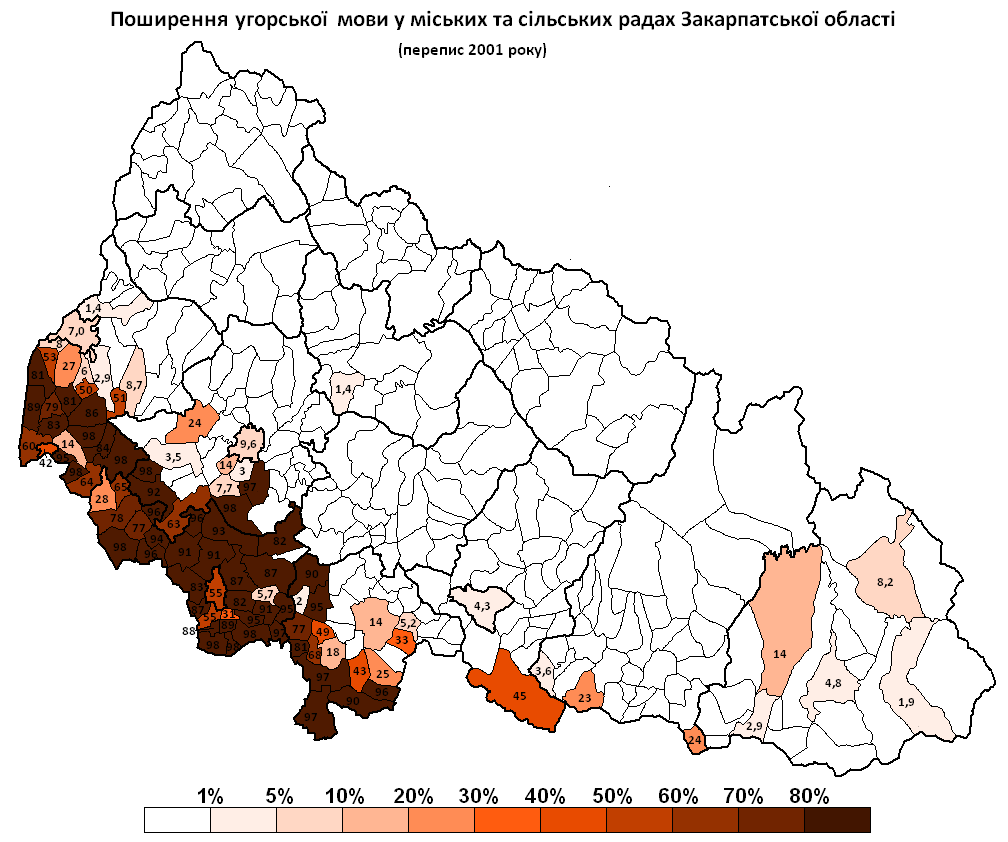
Percentage of Hungarian native speakers in Zakarpattia oblast according to 2001 census

The following data is according to the Ukrainian census of 2001.

Distribution of ethnic Hungarians in cities in the Zakarpattia Oblast
City name	Population	Number of ethnic Hungarians	Percentage
Uzhhorod (Ungvár)	115,600	8,000	6.9%
Berehove (Beregszász)	26,600	12,800	48.1%
Mukachevo (Munkács)	81,600	7,000	8.5%
Khust (Huszt)	31,900	1,700	5.4%
Chop (Csap)	8,919	3,496	39.2%

Distribution of ethnic Hungarians in raions in the Zakarpattia Oblast
Raion name	Population	Number of ethnic Hungarians	Percentage
Berehivskyi Raion (Beregszászi járás)	54,000	41,200	76.1%
Velykyy Bereznyi Raion (Nagybereznai járás)	28,200	—	—
Vynohradiv Raion (Nagyszőlősi járás)	118,000	30,900	26.2%
Volovets Raion (Volóci járás)	25,500	—	—
Irshavskyi Raion (Ilosvai járás)	100,900	100	0.1%
Mizhhiria Raion (Ökörmezői járás)	49,900	—	—
Mukachivskyi Raion (Munkácsi járás)	101,400	12,900	12.7%
Perechyn Raion (Perecsenyi járás)	32,000	—	—
Rakhiv Raion (Rahói járás)	90,900	2,900	3.2%
Svaliava Raion (Szolyvai járás)	54,900	400	0.7%
Tiachiv Raion (Técsői járás)	171,900	5,000	2.9%
Uzhhorodskyi Raion (Ungvári járás)	74,400	24,800	33.4%
Khust Raion (Huszti járás)	96,900	3,800	3.9%

== Cultural heritage ==
Hungarian cultural heritage in Ukraine includes medieval castles:

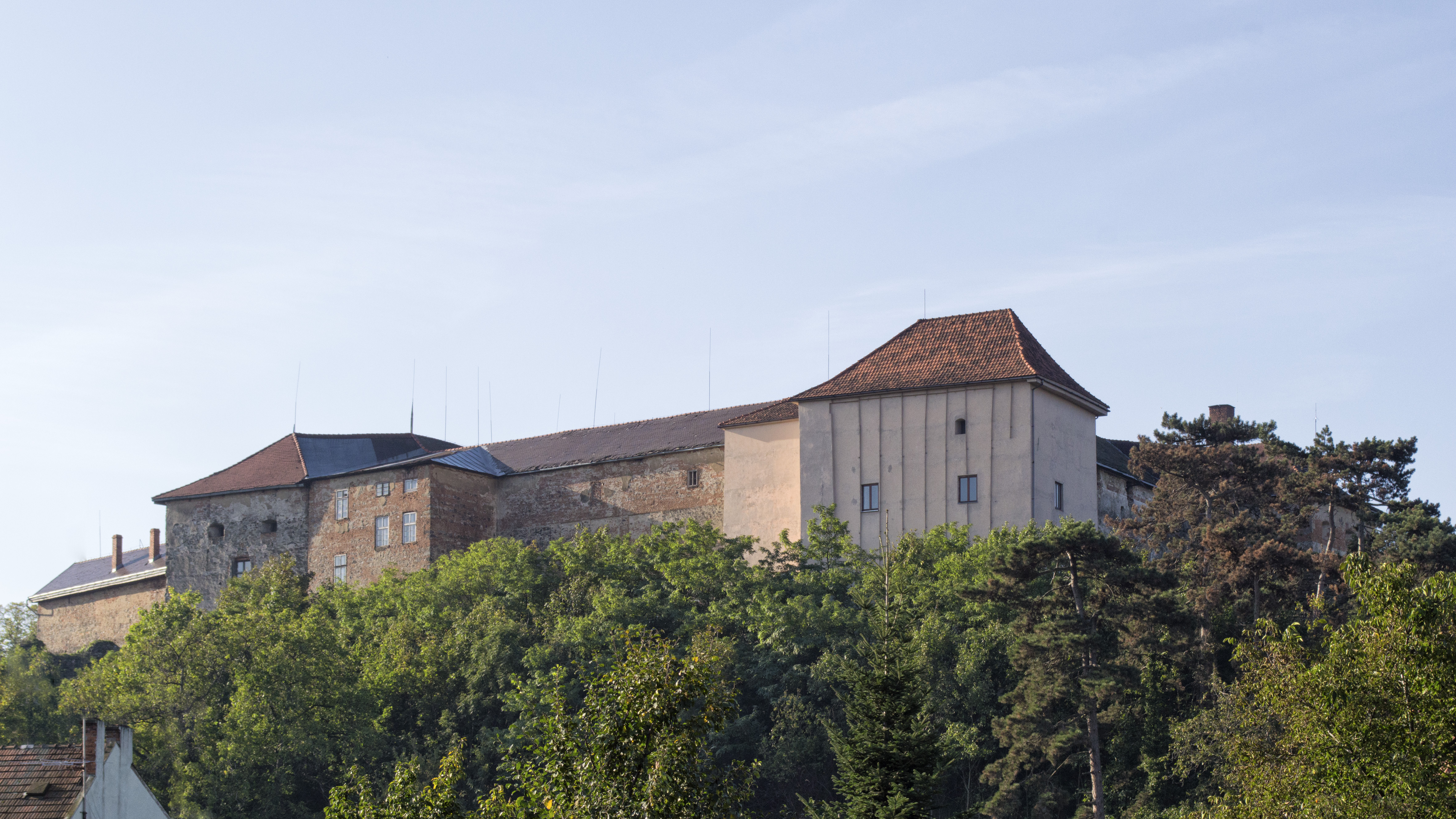
Uzhhorod Castle (Ungvári vár)

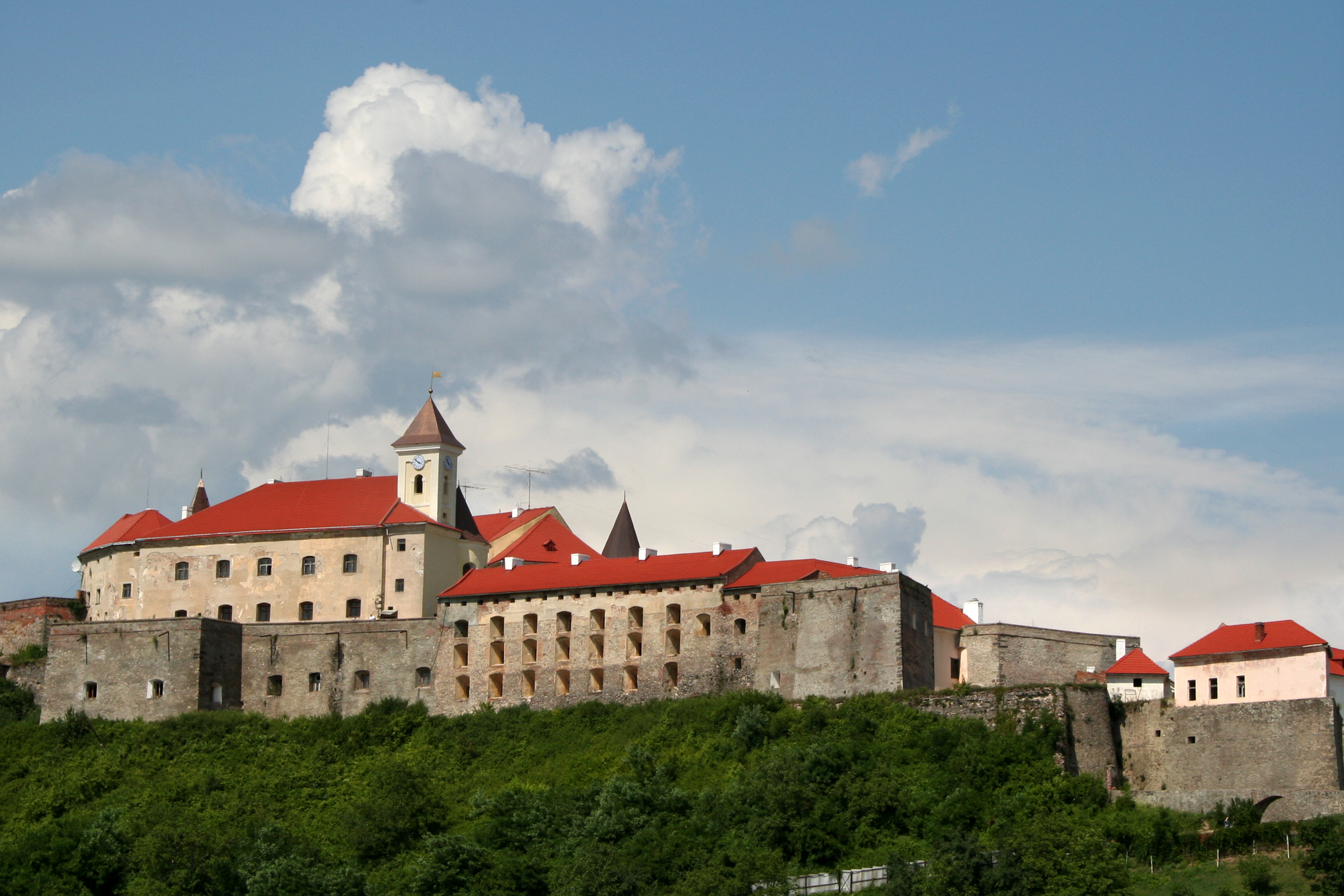
Palanok Castle, Mukachevo (Munkácsi vár)

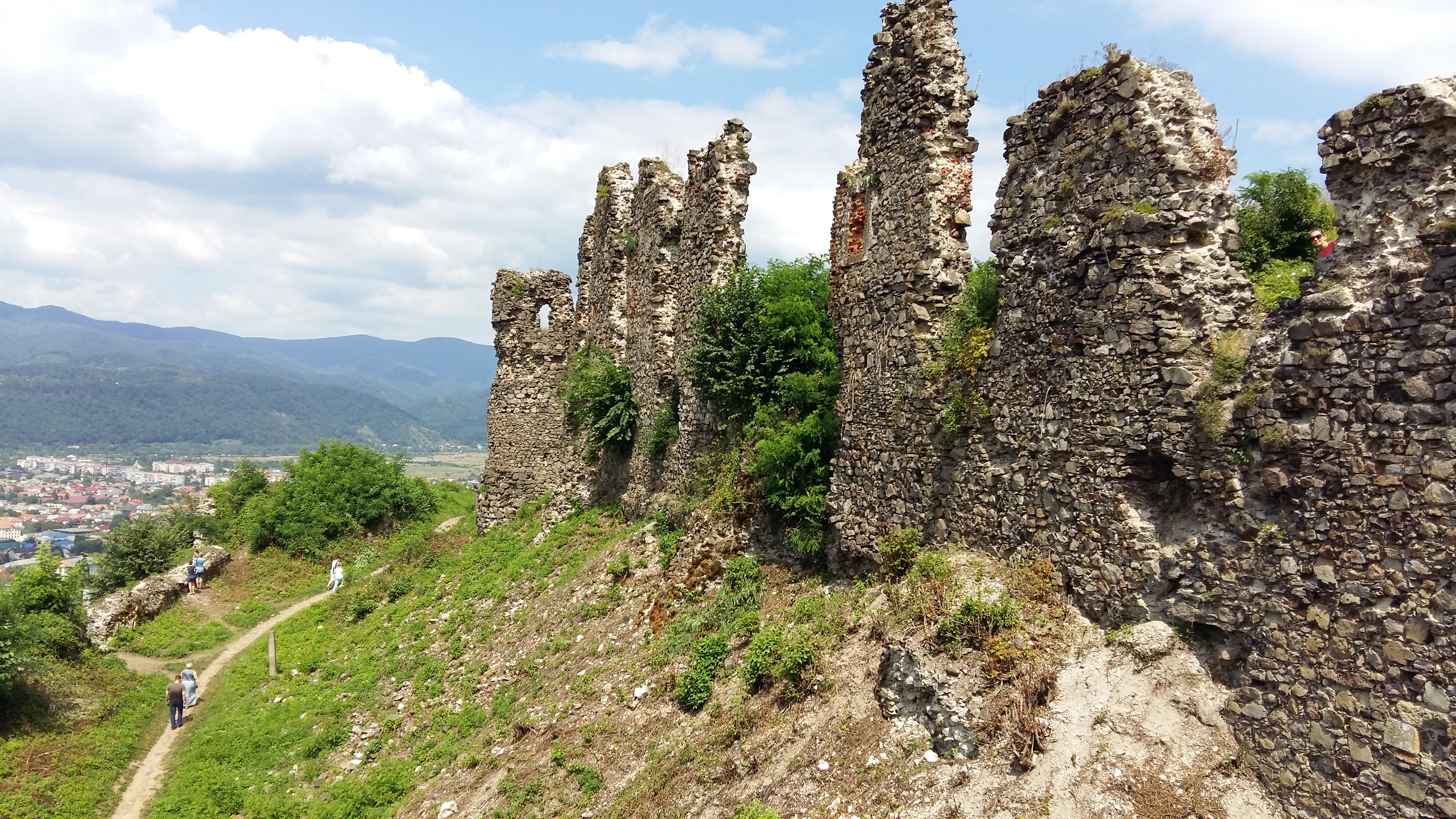
Khust Castle (Huszti vár)

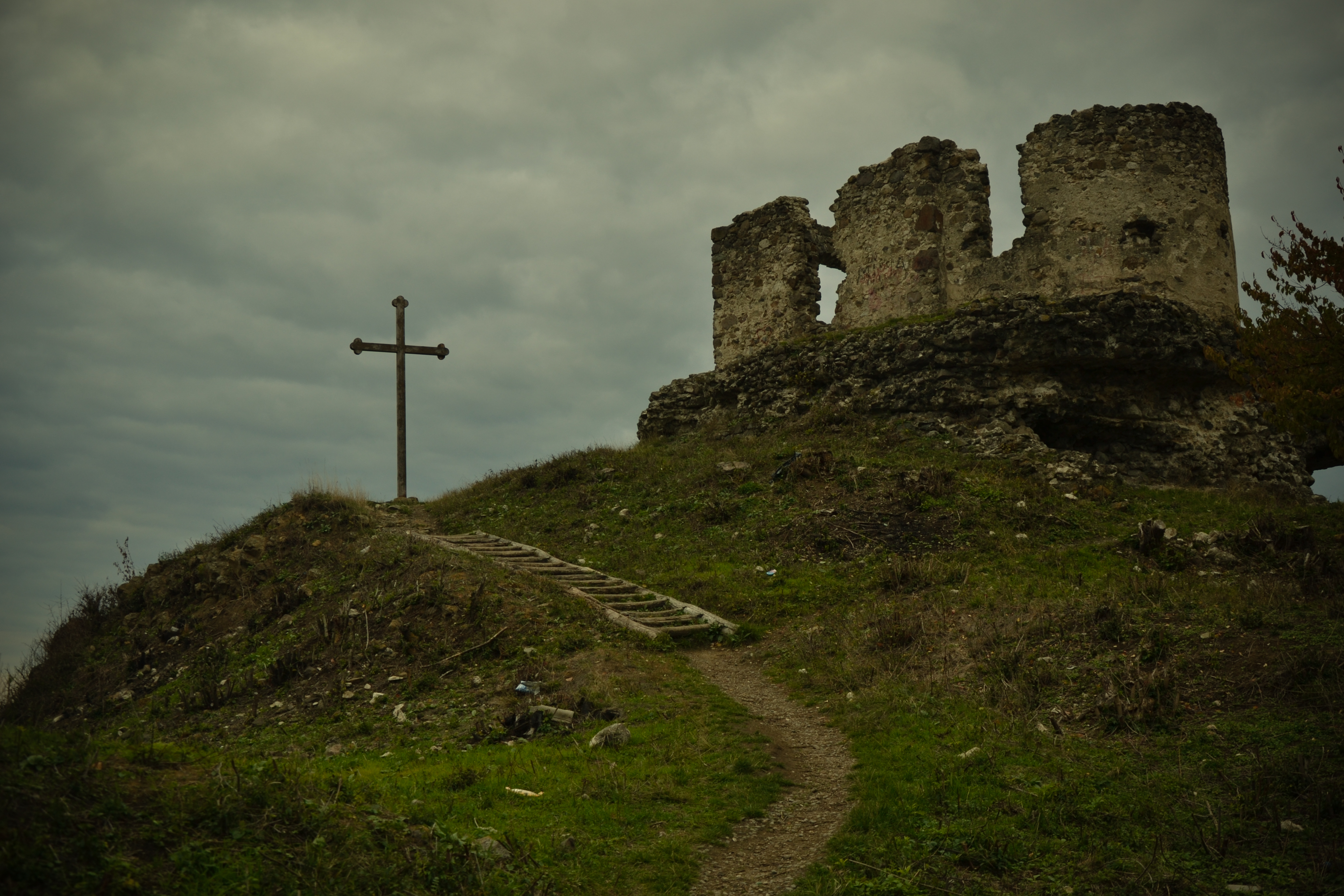
Vynohradiv Castle (Nagyszőlősi Kankó-vár)

== See also ==
- Demographics of Ukraine
- Hungary–Ukraine relations
- Hungarian Greek Catholic Church
- Ukrainians in Hungary
- 1991 Transcarpathian general regional referendum
