= Hungary–Ukraine relations =

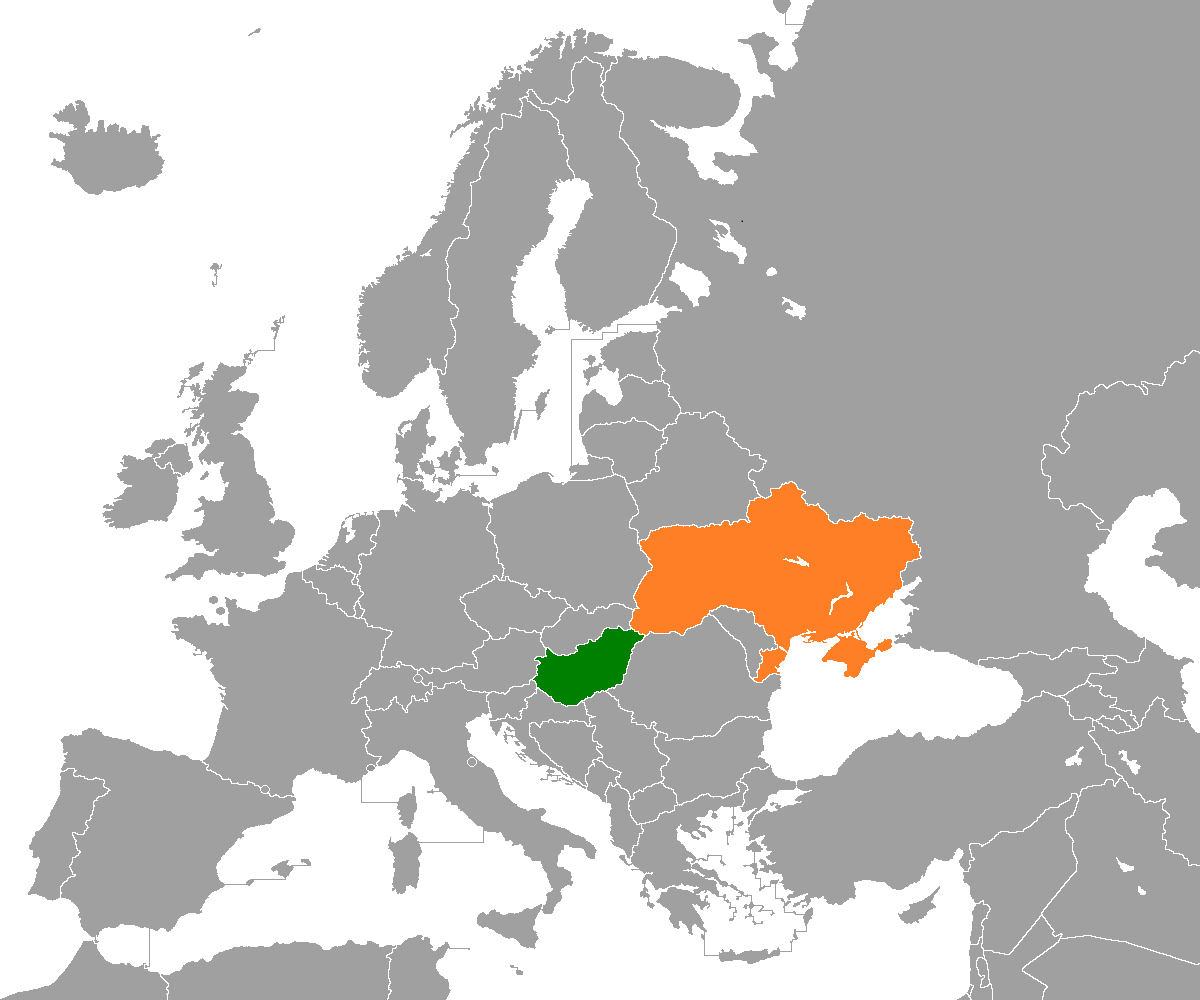

- Hungary: Ukraine

The modern bilateral relationship between Hungary and Ukraine formally began in the early 1990s, after the end of communism in Hungary in 1989 and Ukrainian independence from the Soviet Union in 1991. Since then, the relationship has been marred by controversy over the rights of the Hungarian minority in the western Ukrainian region of Zakarpattia, where 150,000 ethnic Hungarians reside. Hungary and Ukraine have embassies in Kyiv and Budapest, respectively, as well as consulates in regions with large minority populations.

== History ==
=== Hungarian conquest of the Carpathian Basin ===
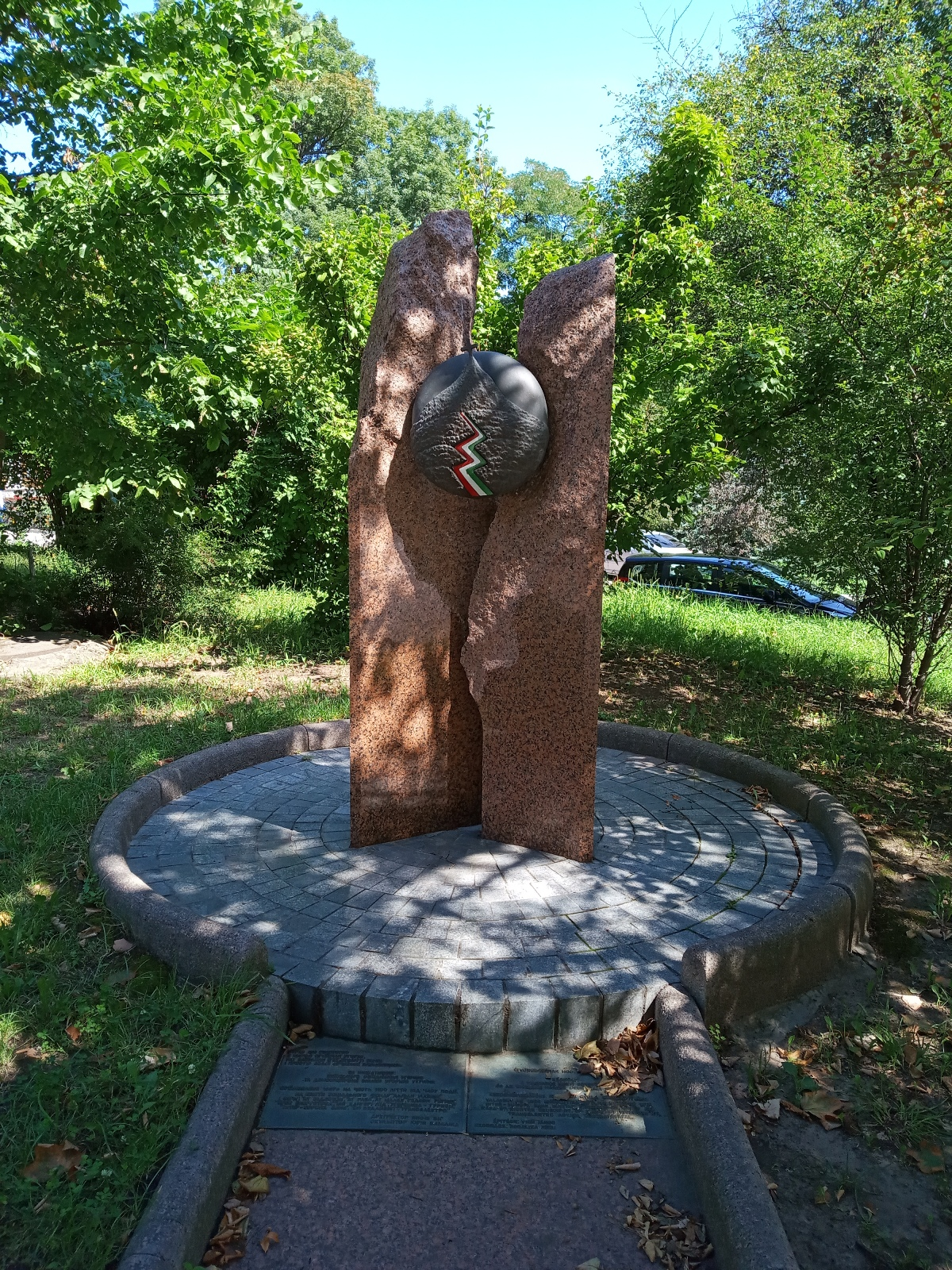
A stele at Askold's Grave commemorating the peaceful passage of the Hungarians

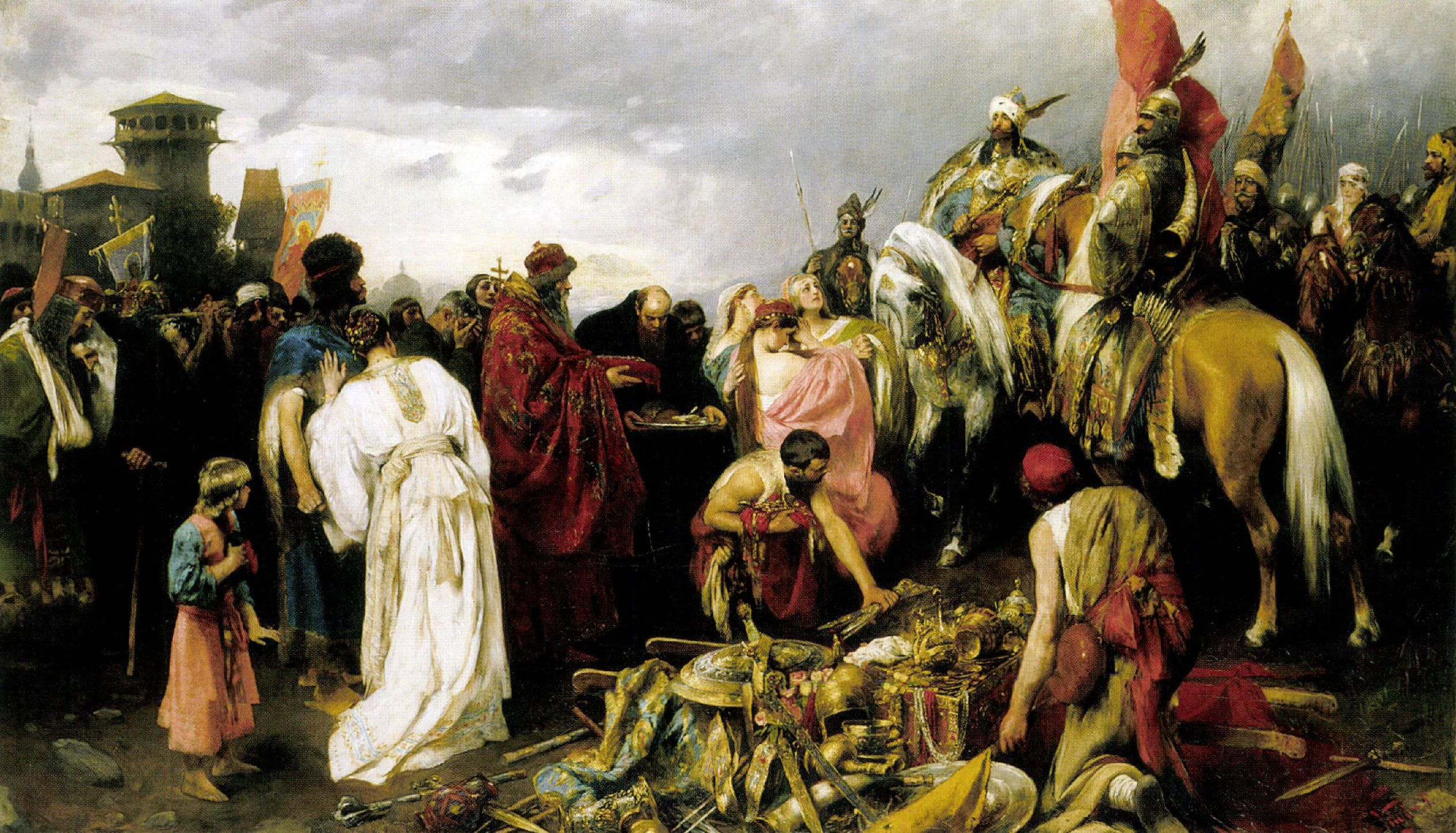
The Hungarians at Kiev; an 1885 oil painting by Pál Vágó depicting the Hungarian stay in Kyiv

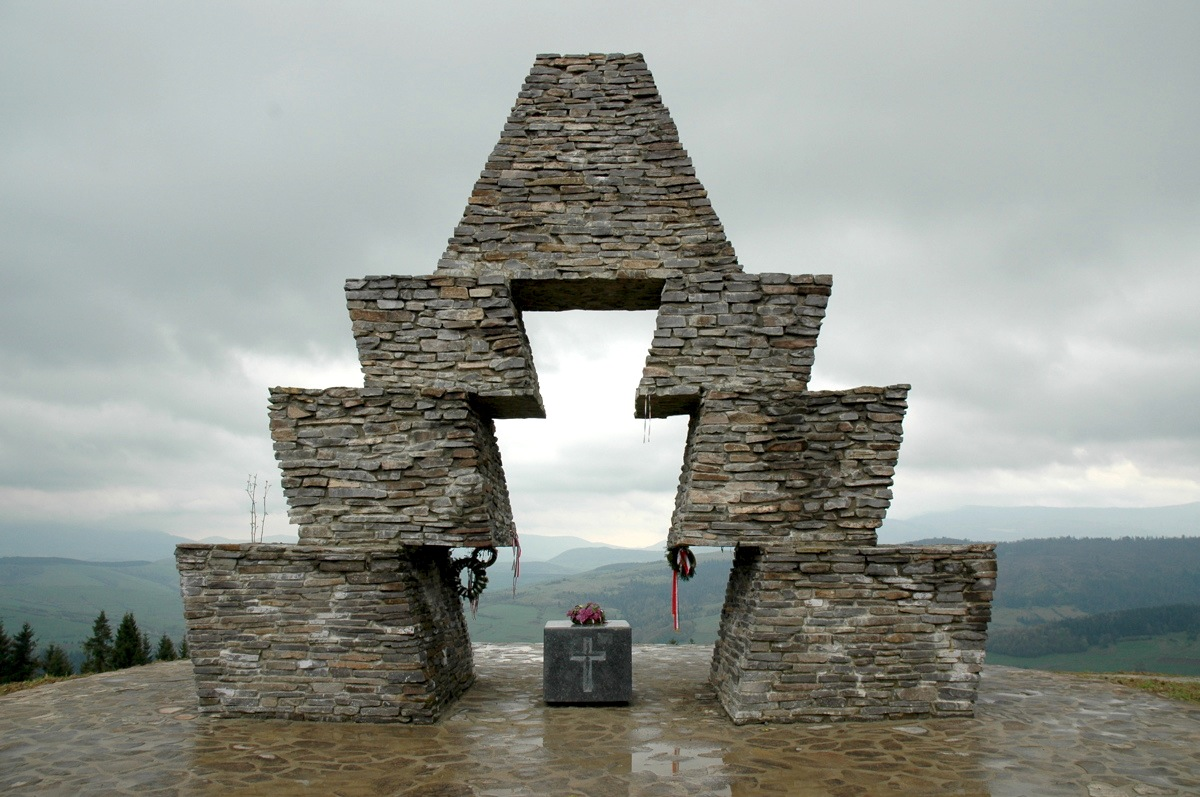
Memorial of the Hungarian conquest of the Carpathian Basin in Verecke Pass, Zakarpattia

As told by the Primary Chronicle, the first interactions between the Hungarians and Kievan Rus' occurred towards the end of the 9th century during the Hungarian conquest of the Carpathian Basin, at Askold's Grave in Kyiv. During the Hungarian migration from the Ural Mountains to the Pannonian Basin, the Hungarians crossed the Dnieper river near Kyiv, the capital of Kievan Rus'. There, they stayed at the site of Askold's grave, eventually passing peacefully through the city. During the Middle Ages, the location of Askold's Grave became known in Ukrainian as Uhors'ke urochyshche (Ukrainian: Угорське урочище, lit. 'Hungarian tract'), in memory of the Hungarian passage through the area, and retains that name today.

In 895, the Hungarians entered the Pannonian Basin through the Verecke Pass in the Carpathian Mountains (today in Ukraine), where they went on to establish the Kingdom of Hungary. In 1996, the Hungarian government received permission from Ukraine to install a monument commemorating the 1100th anniversary of the passing of the Hungarians through the Verecke Pass and the Hungarian conquest of the Carpathian Basin. Completed in 2008 by Hungarian sculptor Péter Matl, the structure sits on the border of Lviv and Zakarpattia oblasts near the village of Klymets.

During the Hungarian invasions of Europe of the 10th century, the Hungarians and Kievan Rus' at various times found themselves allied with one another. In 943, Rus' forces provided support for a Hungarian offensive against the Byzantine Empire, which culminated in the purchasing of peace by Byzantine Emperor Romanos I Lekapenos. During the final Hungarian invasion of Europe, in 970, Grand Prince of Kiev Sviatoslav I attacked the Byzantine Empire with supporting Hungarian auxiliary troops, eventually facing defeat at the Battle of Arcadiopolis and effectively concluding the Hungarian invasions of Europe.

=== Carpatho-Ukraine ===
A map of Carpatho-Ukraine

In 1939, in the aftermath of the breakup of the Second Czechoslovak Republic, the formerly autonomous Carpatho-Ukraine declared independence on 15 March. The same day, the Kingdom of Hungary occupied and annexed the territory. Over the course of a few days, the 40,000 strong Hungarian army overpowered the limited forces of the newly proclaimed unrecognized state, which had only 2,000 troops. By the 18th, Hungarian forces took full control of the territory of Carpatho-Ukraine.

In the chaos that followed, an estimated 27,000 Ukrainian civilians were killed. Approximately 75,000 Ukrainians from the area sought asylum in the Soviet Union, of whom 60,000 ultimately died in Soviet Gulags.

=== Modern relations ===
The modern bilateral relationship between Hungary and Ukraine began in the early 1990s, after the end of communism in Hungary in 1989 and Ukrainian independence from the Soviet Union in 1991. As recently as 2016, relations between the two nations remained largely positive.

==== 2017 language law ====
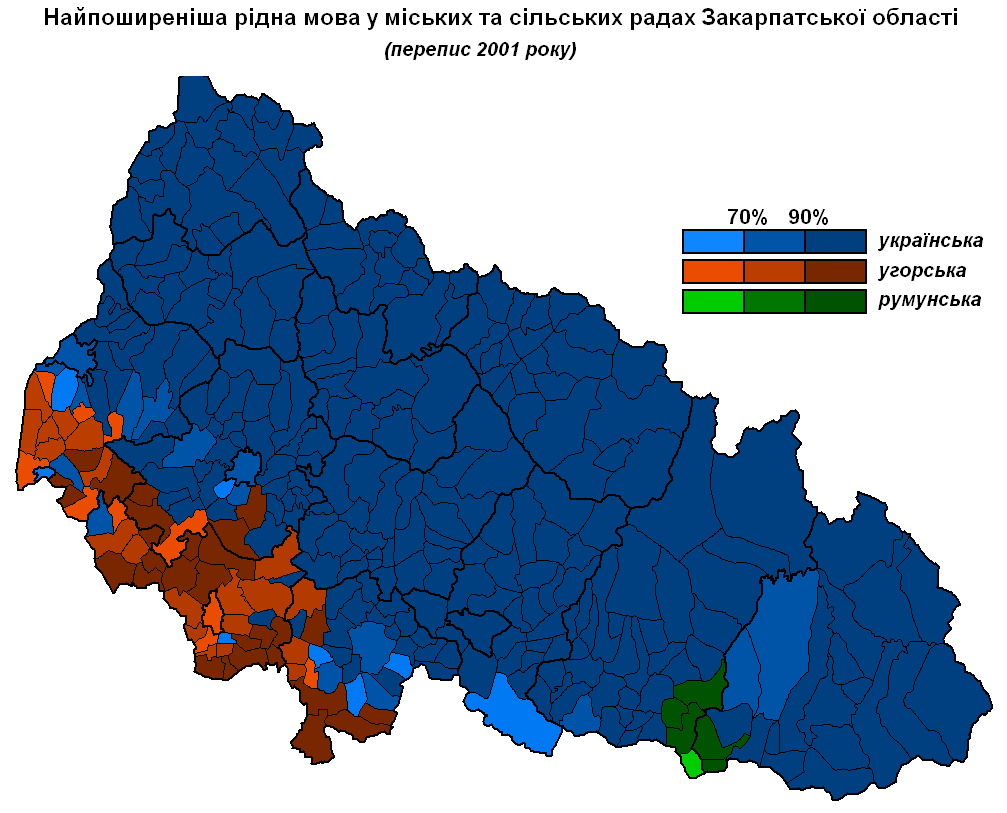
The distribution of Hungarian speakers in Zakarpattia Oblast (red)

In September 2017, then-president of Ukraine Petro Poroshenko signed the 2017 Ukrainian Education Law, which had previously been adopted by the Ukrainian parliament. The new law made Ukrainian the required language of study for all state schools in Ukraine past the fifth grade, reversing a 2012 law signed by ousted former Ukrainian president Viktor Yanukovych that allowed regions with an ethnic minority making up more than ten percent of the population to use minority languages in education. Although mainly intended to discourage the use of Russian in public education, the policy meant that schools in Hungarian majority areas of Zakarpattia, including many funded directly by the Hungarian government, would be forced to stop teaching in the Hungarian language.

In October 2018, Ukrainian politician Iryna Farion compared ethnic Hungarians to "dogs who cannot learn the language of Stepan Bandera", she said "Do we need these idiots in Ukraine? Why should I feed them?" and suggested they "go back to Hungary!"

The change in rules served as the catalyst for the rapid deterioration of relations between Hungary and Ukraine. Immediately after the adoption of the law, Hungarian Minister of Foreign Affairs Péter Szijjártó announced that Hungary would block all further integration of Ukraine into NATO and the European Union and offered to "guarantee that all this will be painful for Ukraine in future." This marked a significant shift in Hungarian foreign policy towards Ukraine, as it had previously supported stronger Ukrainian integration into NATO and the European Union and advocated for visa-free travel between Ukraine and the European Union, largely in order to make travel to Hungary easier for the Hungarian minority in Ukraine.

Following through on its promises, in October 2017, Hungary vetoed and effectively blocked the convening of a NATO-Ukraine commission meeting. In response, Ukrainian officials announced concessions to some Hungarian demands, most notably extending the transition period until the implementation of the language law to 2023.

==== Berehove military base ====
In March 2018, the Ukrainian government announced a plan to restore a military base in the ethnic Hungarian-majority border town of Berehove, situated ten kilometers from the Hungarian border. The plan called for the permanent placement of 800 Ukrainian troops from the 10th Mountain Assault Brigade and the 128th Mountain Assault Brigade at the base.

Ukrainian officials faced immediate backlash from the Hungarian government after the announcement. Hungarian Minister of Foreign Affairs Péter Szijjártó restated that Hungary would block any further Ukrainian integration into NATO or the European Union until Hungarian concerns were addressed, and called the placement of the base in a mostly ethnic Hungarian area "disgusting."

The plans for the base were ultimately abandoned; however, in May 2020, officials again announced plans for the restoration of the same military base and the permanent stationing of Ukrainian troops there, this time from the 80th Air Assault Brigade.

==== Hungarian passport distribution ====
In September 2018, an undercover video that showed diplomats in the Hungarian consulate in Berehove granting Hungarian citizenship and distributing Hungarian passports to Ukrainian citizens sparked new tensions between the two nations. The video, published by Ukrinform, captured recipients of new passports reciting an oath of allegiance to Hungary and singing the Hungarian national anthem. Because voluntarily obtaining a foreign citizenship while failing to renounce Ukrainian citizenship is illegal according to Ukrainian nationality law, Hungarian diplomats instructed new citizens to hide their possession of Hungarian passports from Ukrainian authorities.

In response to the incident, the Foreign Ministry of Ukraine declared the local Hungarian consul in Berehove persona non grata, expelling him from Ukrainian territory and accusing him of violating the Vienna Convention on Consular Relations. In turn, Hungary announced the expulsion of a Ukrainian consul in Budapest and reiterated threats to block Ukraine's further accession to NATO and the European Union.

==== 2019 Ukrainian parliamentary election ====
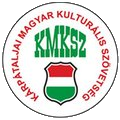
Logo of the Party of Hungarians of Ukraine

In the run-up to the 2019 Ukrainian parliamentary election, Hungarian officials attempted on numerous occasions to influence the results in favor of candidates backed by the Party of Hungarians of Ukraine, a political party active in Zakarpattia Oblast. Specifically, the Hungarian government worked to sway voters in favor of party leader Vasyl Brenzovych and two other candidates contesting seats in the Verkhovna Rada, Ukraine's parliament. The party received direct payments in the form of Hungarian grant money, and the Hungarian Development Bank spent 800,000 Hungarian forints (about 2,400 Euros at the time) paying for billboards supporting the organization in violation of Ukrainian law.

Throughout July 2019, a number of top Hungarian figures visited Zakarpattia in order to hold rallies and lobby voters for the party's candidates, including Minister of Foreign Affairs Péter Szijjártó. Around the same time, party leader and parliamentary candidate Vasyl Brenzovych visited Budapest to attend a meeting with Prime Minister of Hungary Viktor Orbán. Despite the extensive efforts, none of the Party of Hungarians of Ukraine's candidates were ultimately elected.

In response to the meddling, the Ukrainian government accused Hungary of violating the Charter of the United Nations and Vienna Convention on Diplomatic Relations.

==== Gazprom natural gas deal ====
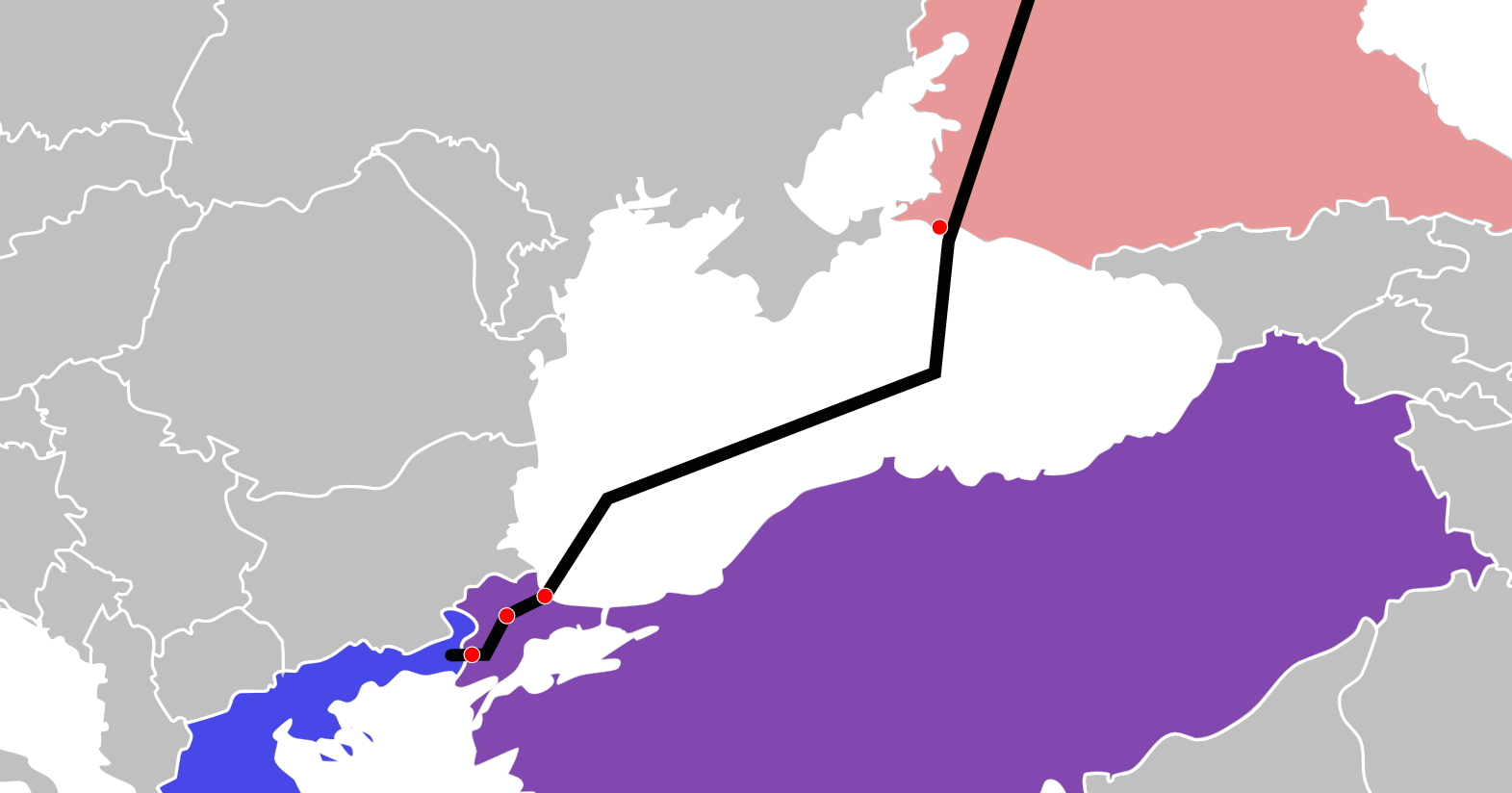
The TurkStream pipeline connects Russia and Turkey under the Black Sea, circumventing Ukraine, which traditionally transmits Russian natural gas to the rest of Europe.

On 27 September 2021, the Hungarian government signed a 15-year natural gas contract with Gazprom, Russia's state-owned energy conglomorate. The deal will provide 4.5 billion cubic meters of Russian gas to Hungary annually through the newly constructed TurkStream pipeline; under the contract, 3.5 billion cubic meters will be transported through Serbia and 1 billion cubic meters will go through Austria, making up about half of Hungary's natural gas consumption. By bypassing Ukraine entirely, the new route strips Ukraine of millions of dollars in profits from transit fees on Russian natural gas shipments to central and western Europe, on which it is economically reliant.

The agreement sparked new tensions between Hungary and Ukraine. Shortly after the contract was signed, the Ukrainian Ministry of Foreign Affairs issued a statement deriding the deal as politically motivated and economically unreasonable, meant solely to please the Kremlin, and intended to harm the national interests of Ukraine and Hungary–Ukraine relations. The statement also accused Hungary of violating the Treaty on Good Neighborliness and Cooperation between Ukraine and Hungary of 6 December 1991, suspended the Joint Ukrainian-Hungarian Intergovernmental Commission on Economic Cooperation, and called for a European Commission investigation into the deal's compliance with European energy law.

In response, Hungarian Minister of Foreign Affairs Péter Szijjártó summoned the Ukrainian ambassador to Hungary, calling Ukraine's actions a "violation of our sovereignty" and accusing Ukraine of trying to halt the deal and prevent "a secure gas supply for Hungary". In turn, Ukraine's Ministry of Foreign Affairs summoned Hungary's ambassador to Ukraine in a tit for tat move, reiterated its position that the agreement undermines Ukraine's national security and the energy security of Europe, and said that it would take "decisive measures" to protect its interests.

In December 2021, the Hungarian government reversed course, signing an agreement to transport up to 2.9 billion cubic meters of natural gas through Ukraine annually on top of the Gazprom deal. Alongside a larger deal with Slovakia, the new contract will increase Ukraine's guaranteed natural gas exports by nearly 30%. On 28 December, after the deal's signing, the foreign ministers of both nations declared their "mutual intention to improve bilateral relations" between Hungary and Ukraine.

==== Russian invasion of Ukraine ====
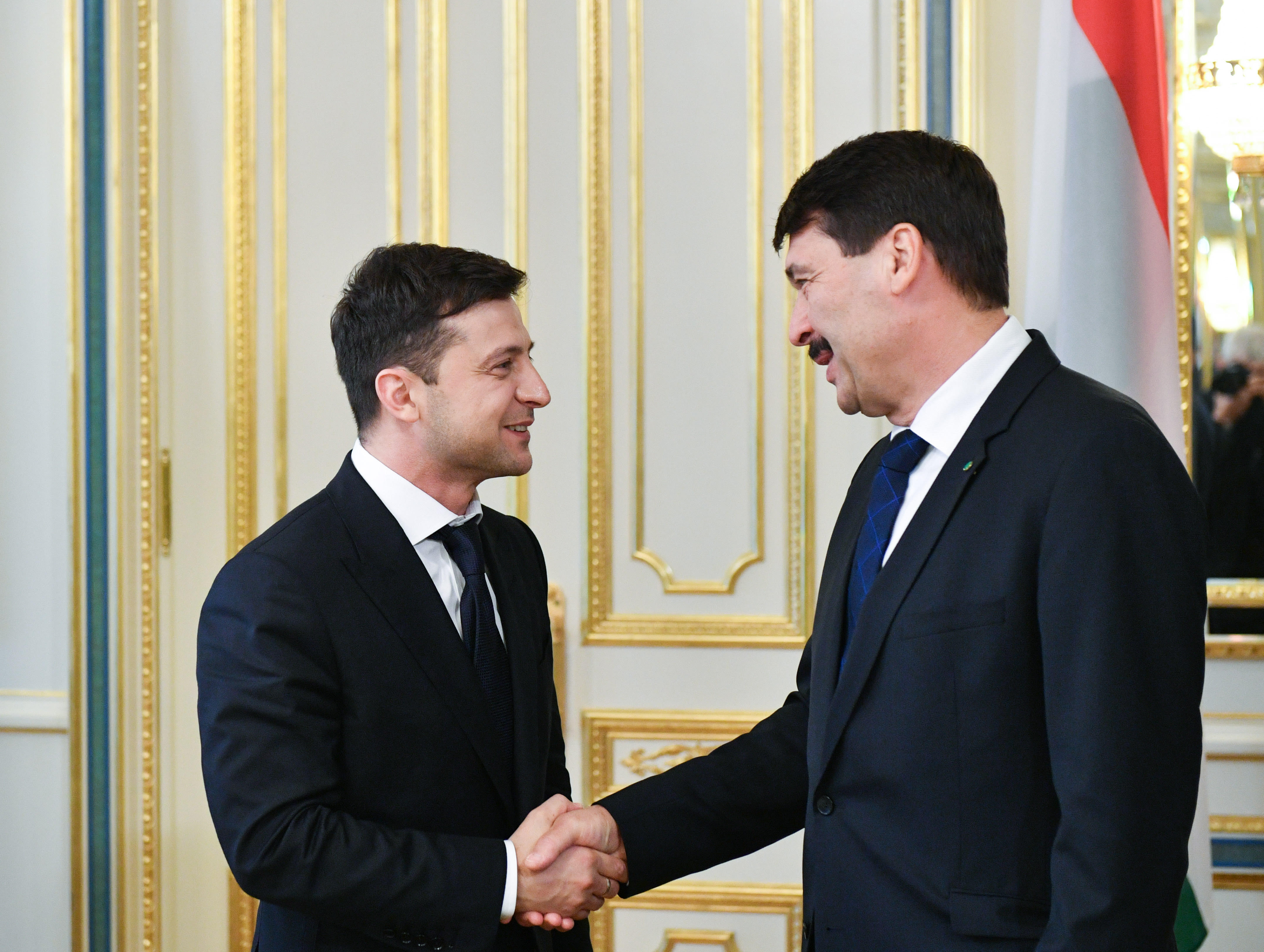
Hungarian President János Áder with Volodymyr Zelenskyy during the latter's inauguration as President of Ukraine in May 2019

Days after the beginning of the Russian invasion of Ukraine in 2022, Hungarian president János Áder and prime minister Viktor Orbán condemned the invasion, and declared their support for Ukraine in the conflict. Áder added that the conflict was "not provoked by Kyiv", and said that Hungary "hold[s] the leaders of the Russian Federation responsible for the bloodshed", while Orbán noted that military support "out of the question, though we will, of course, provide humanitarian aid".

However, in the leadup to the 2022 Hungarian parliamentary election, Orbán avoided directly criticizing Russian president Vladimir Putin, and expressed opposition to potential blockades of Russian oil and gas, on which Hungary relies. During the election, Orbán and Fidesz portrayed the election as a choice between peace or war, with Fidesz for peace and the opposition for war. During his victory speech on 3 April, Orbán said that Ukrainian president Volodymyr Zelenskyy was one of the "opponents" that he had overcome in order to win the parliamentary elections. On 6 April, Hungary signaled its intent to agree to pay for Russian gas in rubles, breaking ranks with the rest of the European Union.

In early May, Hungary said that it would veto a proposed European Union sanctions package against the Russian energy sector. Explaining his country's opposition to the sanctions, Hungarian Minister of Foreign Affairs Péter Szijjártó said that "Hungary’s energy supply cannot be endangered because no one can expect us to allow the price of the war [in Ukraine] to be paid by Hungarians".

On 1 May, Oleksiy Danilov, the secretary of the National Security and Defense Council of Ukraine, accused Hungary of having advance knowledge of the 2022 Russian invasion of Ukraine, saying that Vladimir Putin had warned the Hungarian government ahead of time, and that Hungary had plans to annex parts of Zakarpattia Oblast in Western Ukraine, which lies on the border with Hungary. Hungarian officials condemned Danilov's accusation as false, and expressed outrage over his claims.

Hungary has accepted many refugees from Ukraine, some of them travelled on to other EU countries.

In 2023, apparent classified U.S. intelligence documents released in the 2022–2023 Pentagon document leaks included a note of a conversation between the President of Ukraine and Deputy Prime Minister Yulia Svyrydenko in which Volodymyr Zelenskyy suggested blowing up the Druzhba pipeline to hit Hungarian industry, as Orbán's government was too friendly towards the Kremlin during the Russo-Ukrainian War.

In June 2023, considerable tensions arose between the two nations from a transfer of eleven Ukrainian POWs from the Russian Federation to Hungary without the involvement of Ukrainian officials. Later three of this group were sent back to Ukraine. According by Ukrainian authorities the prisonsers reportedly from Zakarpattia Oblast and of Hungary ethnicity, were allegedly moved under the auspices of the Russian Orthodox Church allegedly request of Budapest, the claims have not been independently confirmed. The Hungarian foreign ministry denied that it had knowledge of such a transfer, but Ukrainian government sources claimed otherwise, as the men had no access to open source information during the process. Later on 15 July, Hungarian President Katalin Novák accepted an invitation by Kyiv for a visit on 23 August for the Crimean Platform with a prior stop in the Zakarpattia Oblast.

In July 2024, Zelenskyy decided to shut down the overland pipeline transfer of petroleum products from Russia to Hungary. Orbán and his government protested this event strenuously.

On May 9, 2025, a pair of alleged Hungarian spies were caught in Zakarpattia Oblast and arrested on the initiative of the Security Service of Ukraine.

On 5 March 2026, Russia released two ethnic Hungarian prisoners of war (dual citizens of Hungary and Ukraine) directly to Budapest, a move condemned by Kyiv as a "provocation". Hungary's foreign minister stated that the two prisoners of war had previously asked help from Hungary. The transfer drew attention to longstanding tensions between the Hungarian government and Ukraine over the rights of the Transcarpathian Hungarian minority, including disputes over language rights and Hungarian accusations that Kyiv is continuously conscripting ethnic Hungarians into military service.

On 6 March 2026, the European Commission rebuked Ukrainian President Zelenskyy over threats against Hungarian Prime Minister Viktor Orbán.

===== Conscripting =====
László Brenzovics, president of the Transcarpathian Hungarian Cultural Association stated that the situation of the Hungarian minority in Transcarpathia has deteriorated dramatically in recent years, and that Hungarian–Ukrainian relations are becoming increasingly tense. According to his information, by March 2026 around 500 ethnic Hungarian men from Transcarpathia had been conscripted, and the number of deaths may be around 100. In many cases, relatives have received no news about the conscripted soldiers for years; the military authorities merely inform them that the individual is missing. He claims that forced conscription is ongoing in Ukraine, with what he described as "manhunts" and "abductions taking place in the streets". There have reportedly been frequent cases in which multiple ethnic Hungarian men were taken by force, including individuals who had medical exemptions or occupational deferments. Recruiters, he said, are often unconcerned even if their targets are injured or killed.

In July 2025, Hungary imposed an entry ban on Ukrainian military officials amid a diplomatic dispute caused by the death of József Sebestyén an ethnic Hungarian from Transcarpathia with a dual Hungarian-Ukrainian citizen who died in disputed circumstances following his mobilization into the Ukrainian military, he was allegedly beaten with iron bars by Ukrainian recruitment officers.

In January 2026, Zsolt Rebán was taken from the street by recruiters despite having previously been declared unfit for military service on several occasions due to a serious heart condition, he later became unwell at the training center and died. In response to these developments, Prime Minister Viktor Orbán announced that the Hungarian government had decided to expel, without delay, Ukrainian individuals involved in forced conscription from the territory of Hungary.

In March 2026, Károly Kádas died under suspicious circumstances, and his relatives consider the Ukrainian explanation absurd. According to the official account, he shot himself multiple times and even disposed of the weapon. His family suspects that he may have been killed within the Ukrainian military before being sent to the front.

On 2 March 2026, Hungarian Foreign Minister Péter Szijjártó summoned the Ukrainian ambassador, stating that two Ukrainian citizens of Hungarian ethnicity had been wrongly conscripted. He described the Ukrainian process as "ongoing violent conscriptions and the ongoing open street-level ‌manhunt".

=== Accession of Ukraine to the European Union ===
On June 21, 2022, Zelenskyy called Viktor Orbán by phone to discuss Ukraine's integration into the EU. The Hungarian Prime Minister indicated that he is open to helping the country and supporting its status as a candidate for EU membership.

The Council of the European Union voted to begin accession negotiations with Ukraine in December 2023. These talks were preceded by a significant revision by the Ukrainian government in December 2023 to legislation on national minorities in Ukraine, which addressed recommendations from the Council of Europe's Venice Commission regarding the legislation. Previously, the Hungarian government (specifically Balázs Orbán, political advisor to the Hungarian Prime Minister) had indicated that, without improvement to Ukrainian legislation on national minority rights, Hungary would not support Ukraine's desire for EU accession. After the revision to the Ukrainian national minorities legislation, Hungarian Foreign Minister Péter Szijjártó noted that it represented an improvement but suggested that national minority legislation was not yet entirely satisfactory to Hungary. The revised Ukrainian national minority legislation includes, according to a summary of legislation by Rubryka, the right of "[r]epresentatives of national minorities" to "receive basic and specialized secondary education in their respective languages" and the right of private universities "to choose a language of teaching" provided that it is an official language of the European Union. Importantly, the Polish Centre for Eastern Studies notes in an analysis that the Hungarian government did not seem to place national minorities legislation concerns at the center of its discourse on opposing "Ukraine’s integration with the EU", instead "[focusing] on accusing the Ukrainian leadership of ‘widespread and systemic corruption’ and emphasising Ukraine's problems with the rule of law and democracy".

In June 2025, Hungarian Prime Minister Viktor Orbán announced Hungary's opposition to Ukraine's accession negotiations with the European Union and NATO.

== Carpathian Eight ==
On 18 September 2026, Ukrainian President Volodymyr Zelenskyy announced the creation of the Carpathian Eight, a regional cooperation format involving Austria, the Czech Republic, Hungary, Poland, Romania, Serbia, Slovakia and Ukraine. The initiative was presented as a framework for cooperation in trade, transport, energy and security.

== Diplomatic missions ==
Due to their significant minority populations within each other's borders, Hungary and Ukraine each maintain an extensive network of diplomatic missions across both nations. Hungary has an embassy in Kyiv, a consulate-general in Uzhhorod, and a consulate in Berehove, while Ukraine maintains an embassy in Budapest and a consulate-general in Nyíregyháza.

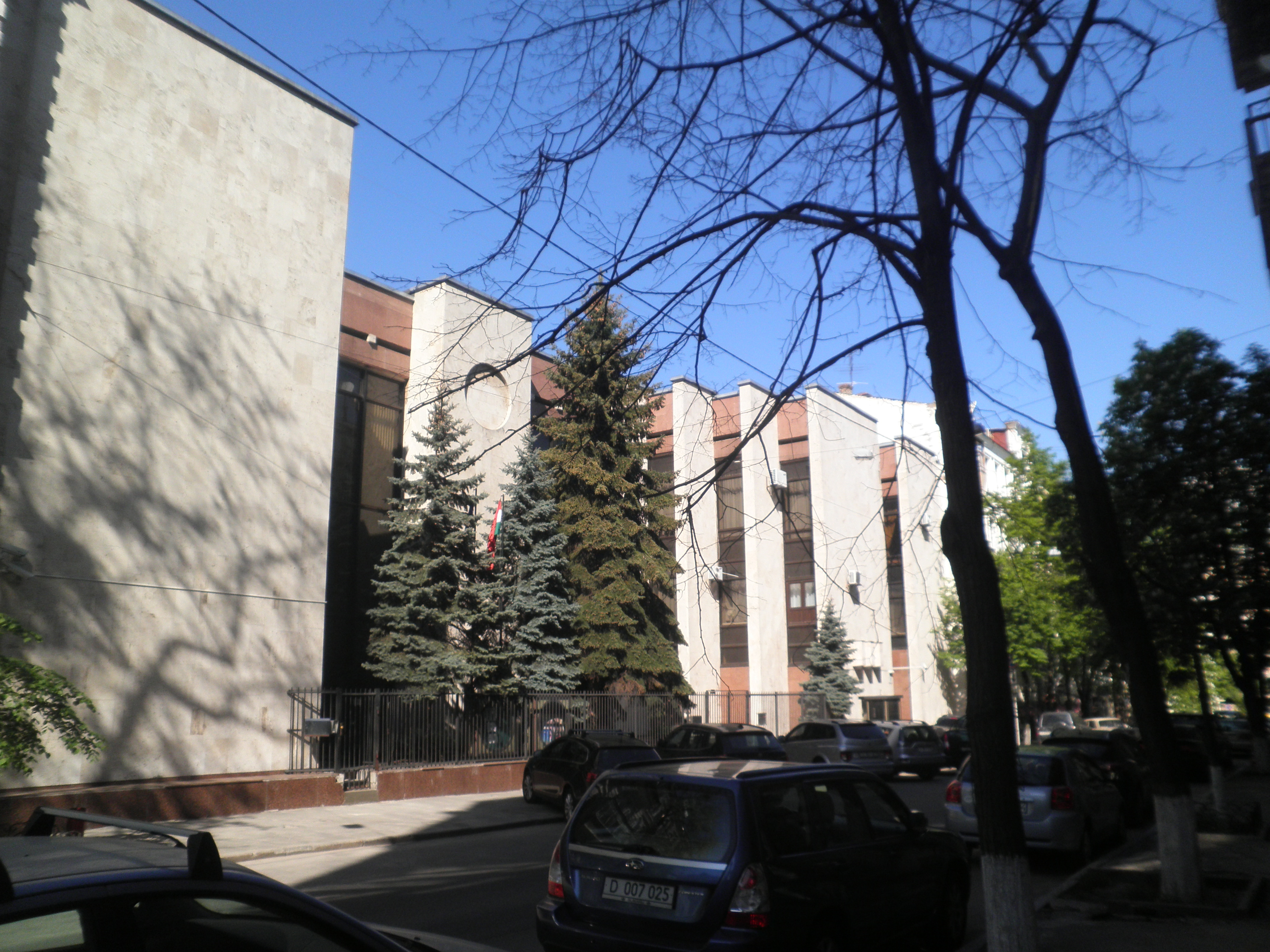
The Hungarian embassy in Ukraine, in Kyiv

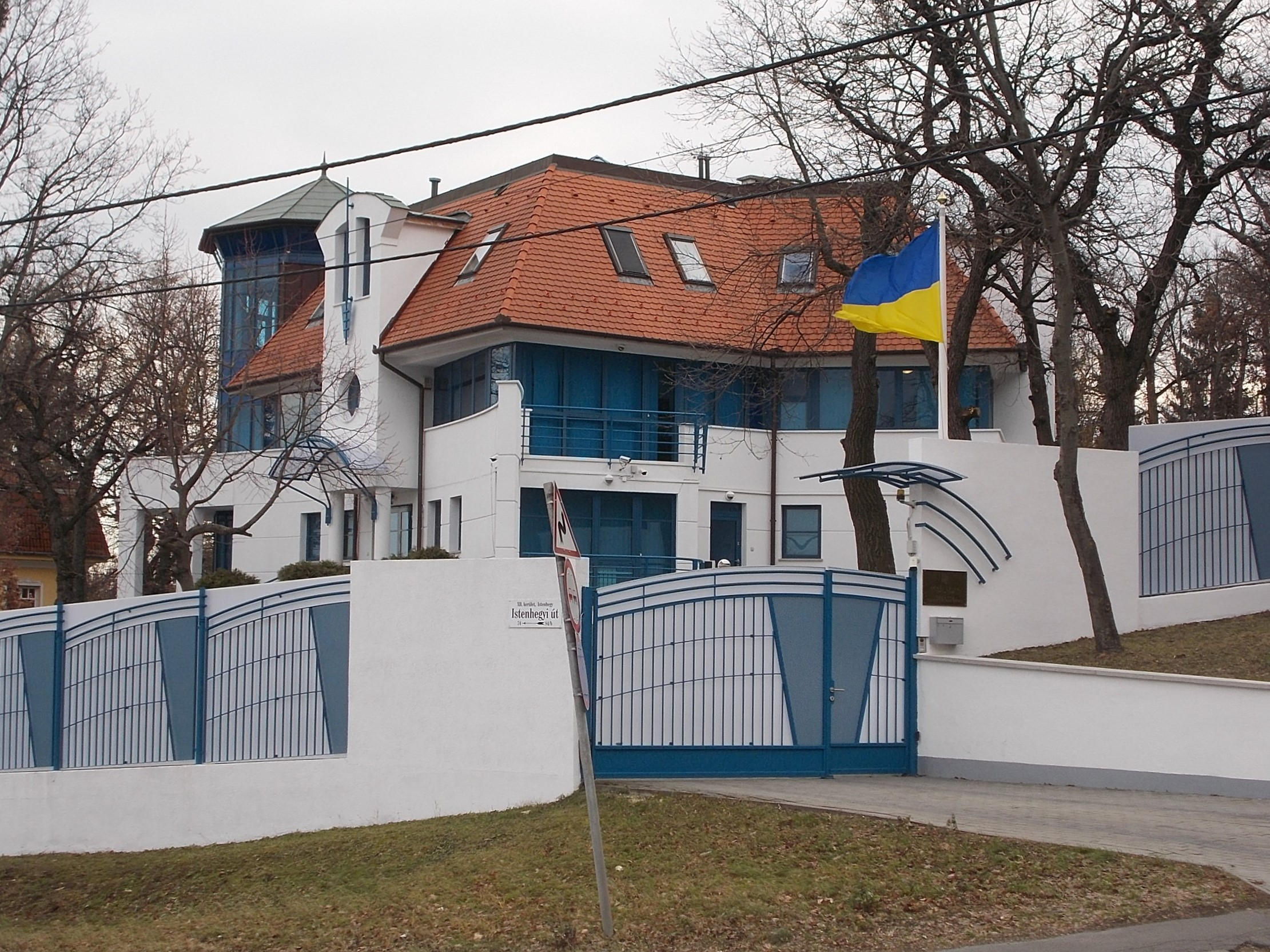
The Ukrainian embassy in Hungary, in Hegyvidék, Budapest

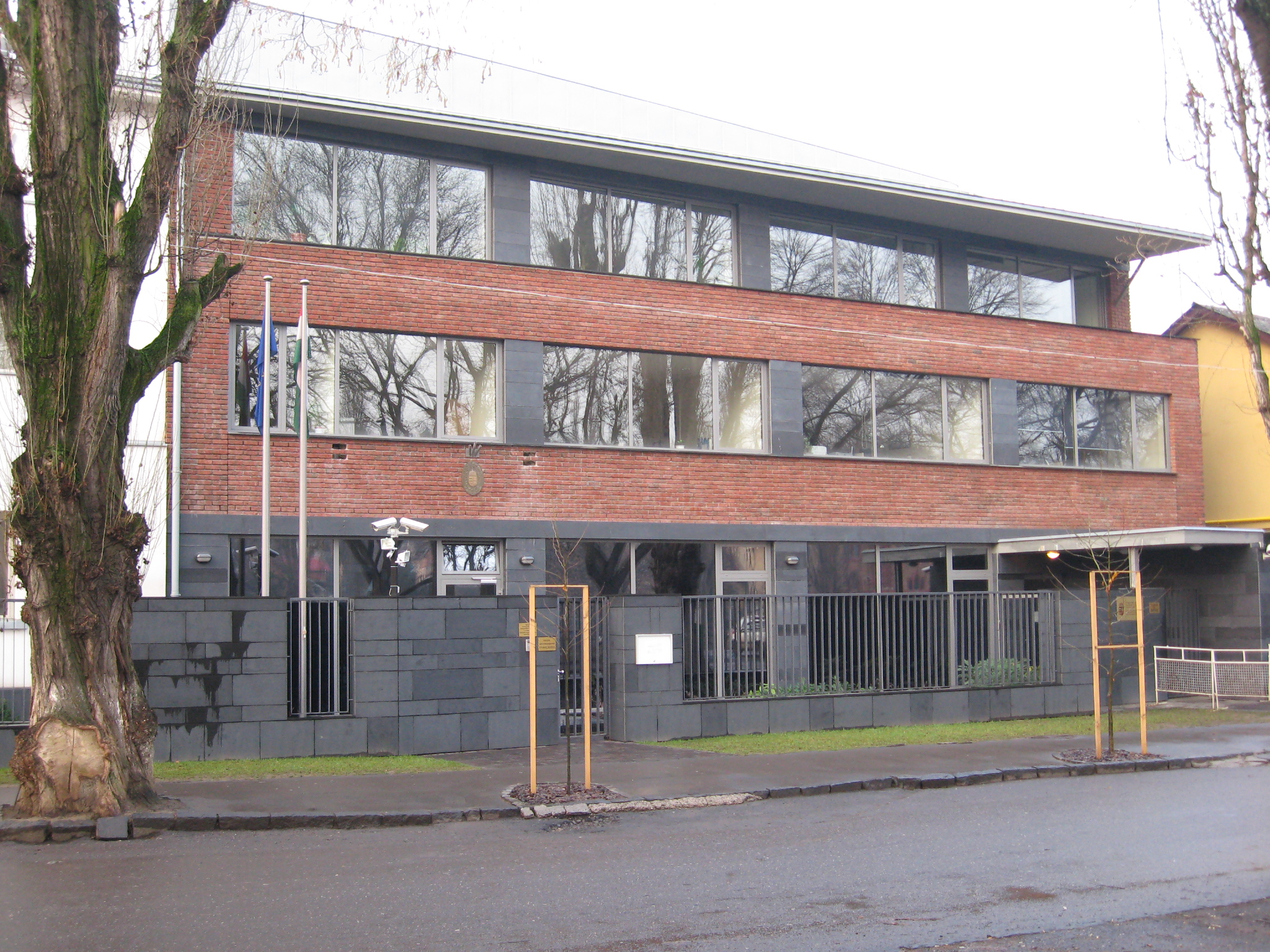
Hungary's consulate-general in Uzhhorod, the capital of Zakarpattia

== Border ==
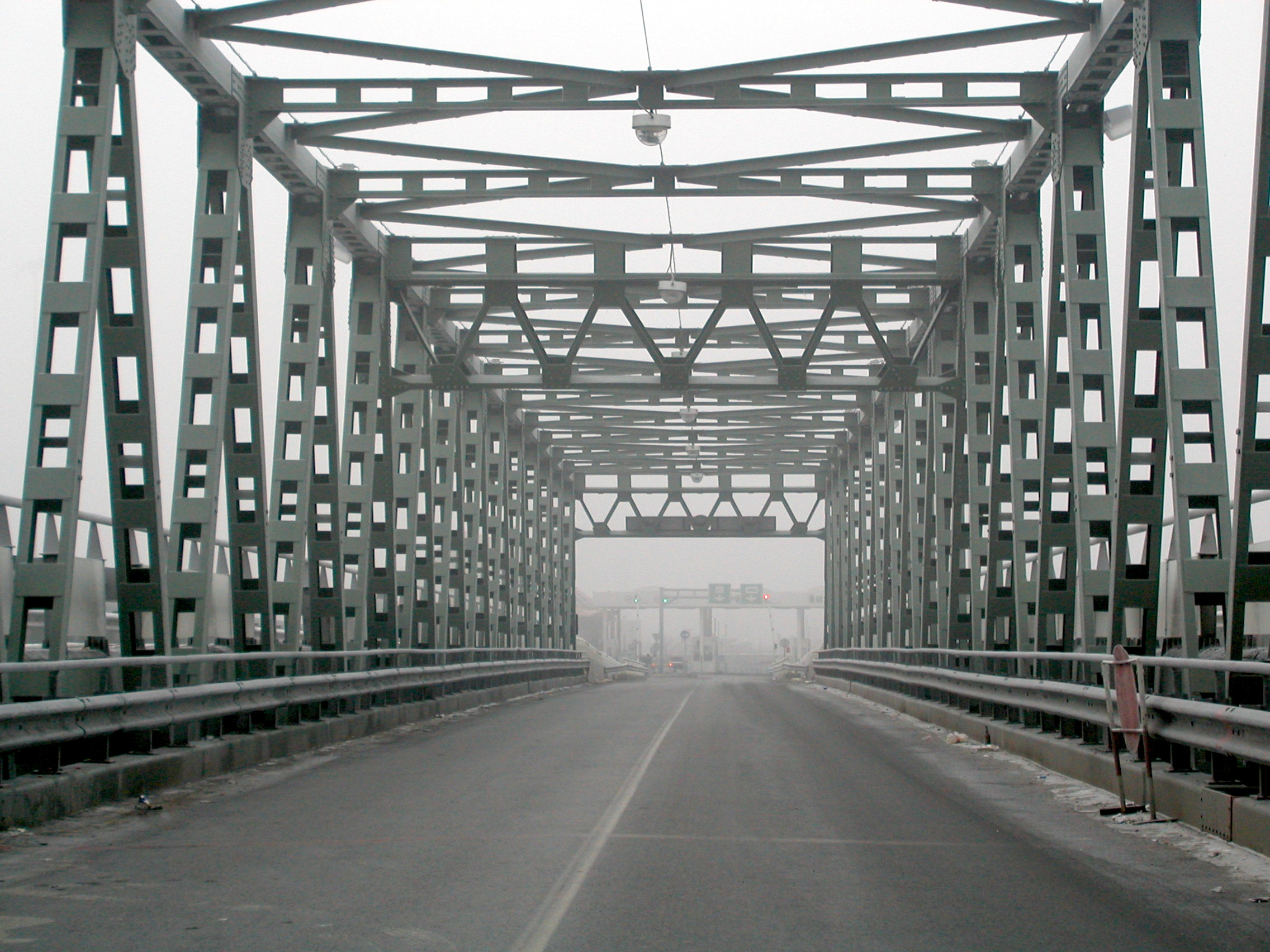
The Tisza Bridge, which carries the E573 across the Hungary–Ukraine border

Hungary and Ukraine share a 136.7 km (84.9 mi) border, roughly following the Tisza river across the Zakarpattia Lowland. The border has a single point of entry by passenger rail, between Chop and Záhony, and one point of entry that only serves freight rail, between Solovka and Eperjeske.

A number of Ukrainian highways and Hungarian roads meet at the border, including Ukraine's M06, which turns into Hungary's Main Road 4 in Solomonovo, and the M26, which continues as Route 491 in Hungary. Both route systems are part of the international E-road network, as the E573 and E58, respectively. Only five official points of entry for vehicles exist along the border.

Because Hungary is a member of the European Union while Ukraine is not, the boundary is an external border of the European Union. Since the approval of visa-free travel between Ukraine and the European Union in 2017, the border can be crossed in either direction without a travel visa.

== Twin towns and sister cities ==
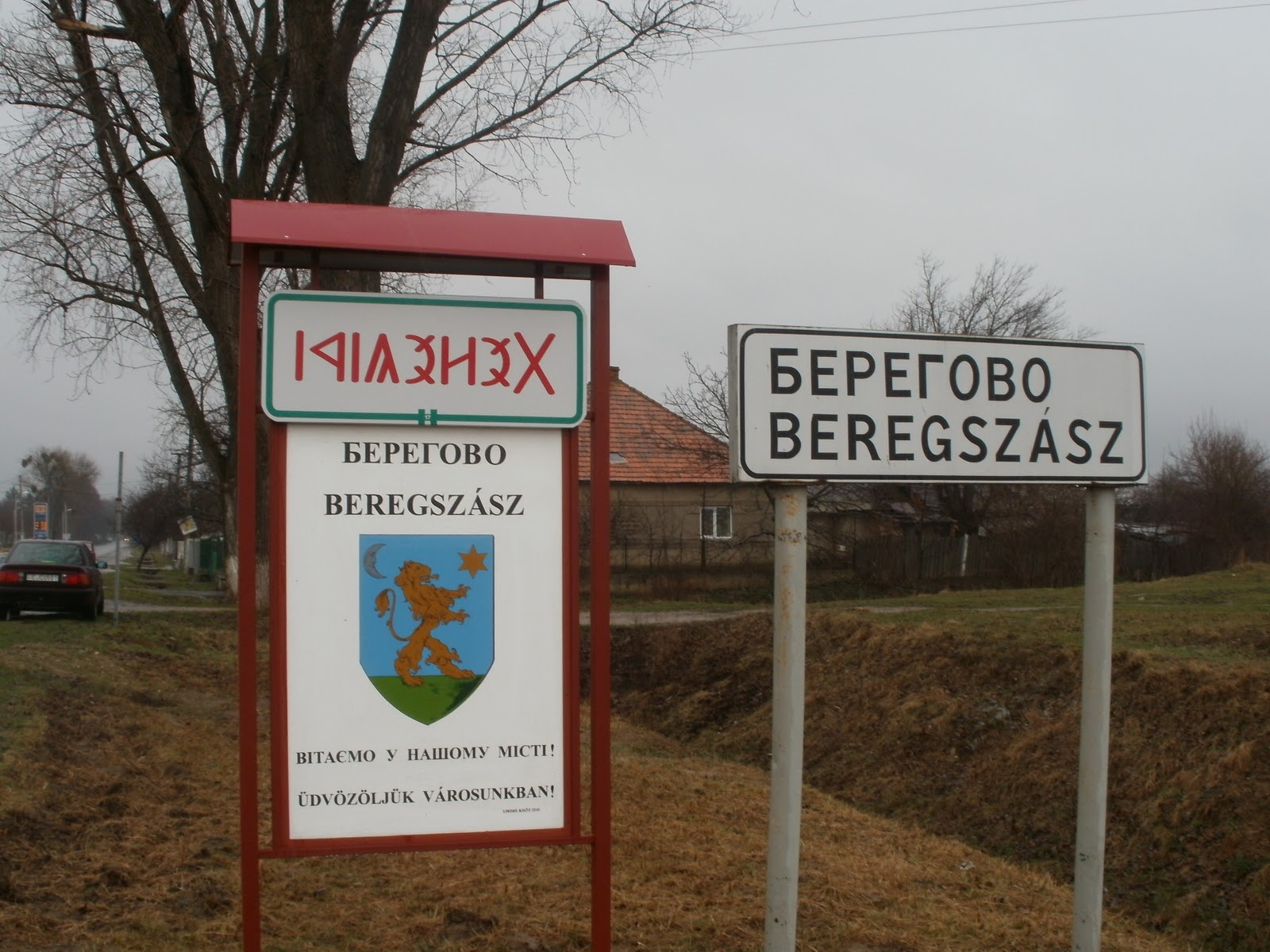
A welcome sign at Berehove's city limits in Ukrainian, Hungarian, and Old Hungarian script

Because of the Hungarian minority there, the vast majority of Hungary and Ukraine's city links involve towns and villages in Zakarpattia Oblast; specifically, many twinned Ukrainian towns are on or near the border with Hungary and have Hungarian-majority populations. Conversely, multiple agreements between the two nation's municipalities involve towns and villages in Hungary's Szabolcs-Szatmár-Bereg County, which is home to a significant part of the Ukrainian minority in Hungary.

- (Hungary) Baktalórántháza, Szabolcs-Szatmár-Bereg County – (Ukraine) Tiachiv, Zakarpattia Oblast
- (Hungary) Balmazújváros, Hajdú-Bihar County – (Ukraine) Tiachiv, Zakarpattia Oblast
- (Hungary) Békéscsaba, Békés County – (Ukraine) Uzhhorod, Zakarpattia Oblast
- (Hungary) Biatorbágy, Pest County – (Ukraine) Velyka Dobron, Zakarpattia Oblast
- (Hungary) Bicske, Fejér County – (Ukraine) Chop, Zakarpattia Oblast
- (Hungary) Budakeszi, Pest County – (Ukraine) Dyida, Zakarpattia Oblast
- (Hungary) Budapest – (Ukraine) Berehove, Zakarpattia Oblast
- (Hungary) Belváros-Lipótváros, Budapest – (Ukraine) Rakhiv, Zakarpattia Oblast
- (Hungary) Budafok-Tétény, Budapest – (Ukraine) Koson, Zakarpattia Oblast
- (Hungary) Celldömölk, Vas County – (Ukraine) Mukachevo, Zakarpattia Oblast
- (Hungary) Dabas, Pest County – (Ukraine) Mukachevo, Zakarpattia Oblast
- (Hungary) Deszk, Csongrád-Csanád County – (Ukraine) Rakhiv, Zakarpattia Oblast
- (Hungary) Diósd, Pest County – (Ukraine) Velyki Heivtsi, Zakarpattia Oblast
- (Hungary) Dunaújváros, Fejér County – (Ukraine) Alchevsk, Luhansk Oblast
- (Hungary) Eger, Heves County – (Ukraine) Mukachevo, Zakarpattia Oblast and (Ukraine) Vynohradiv, Zakarpattia Oblast
- (Hungary) Felsőzsolca, Borsod-Abaúj-Zemplén County – (Ukraine) Vyshkovo, Zakarpattia Oblast
- (Hungary) Ferencváros, Budapest – (Ukraine) Berehove, Zakarpattia Oblast
- (Hungary) Göd, Pest County – (Ukraine) Yanoshi, Zakarpattia Oblast
- (Hungary) Hajdúböszörmény, Hajdú-Bihar County – (Ukraine) Berehove, Zakarpattia Oblast
- (Hungary) Hatvan, Heves County – (Ukraine) Berehove, Zakarpattia Oblast
- (Hungary) Hódmezővásárhely, Csongrád-Csanád County – (Ukraine) Solotvyno, Zakarpattia Oblast
- (Hungary) Inárcs, Pest County – (Ukraine) Bene, Zakarpattia Oblast
- (Hungary) Jászberény, Jász-Nagykun-Szolnok County – (Ukraine) Tiachiv, Zakarpattia Oblast
- (Hungary) Jászfényszaru, Jász-Nagykun-Szolnok County – (Ukraine) Hat, Zakarpattia Oblast
- (Hungary) Kecskemét, Bács-Kiskun County – (Ukraine) Berehove, Zakarpattia Oblast and (Ukraine) Simferopol, Autonomous Republic of Crimea
- (Hungary) Kistarcsa, Pest County – (Ukraine) Fanchykovo, Zakarpattia Oblast
- (Hungary) Kisújszállás, Jász-Nagykun-Szolnok County – (Ukraine) Serne, Zakarpattia Oblast
- (Hungary) Kisvárda, Szabolcs-Szatmár-Bereg County – (Ukraine) Mukachevo, Zakarpattia Oblast
- (Hungary) Komárom, Komárom-Esztergom County – (Ukraine) Khust, Zakarpattia Oblast
- (Hungary) Körmend, Vas County – (Ukraine) Pivdenne, Odesa Oblast
- (Hungary) Kunszentmiklós, Bács-Kiskun County – (Ukraine) Chepa, Zakarpattia Oblast
- (Hungary) Maglód, Pest County – (Ukraine) Bene, Zakarpattia Oblast
- (Hungary) Mátészalka, Szabolcs-Szatmár-Bereg County – (Ukraine) Mukachevo, Zakarpattia Oblast
- (Hungary) Mosonmagyaróvár, Győr-Moson-Sopron County – (Ukraine) Berehove, Zakarpattia Oblast
- (Hungary) Nagykálló, Szabolcs-Szatmár-Bereg County – (Ukraine) Tiachiv, Zakarpattia Oblast
- (Hungary) Nyírbátor, Szabolcs-Szatmár-Bereg County – (Ukraine) Khust, Zakarpattia Oblast and (Ukraine) Vynohradiv, Zakarpattia Oblast
- (Hungary) Nyíregyháza, Szabolcs-Szatmár-Bereg County – (Ukraine) Uzhhorod, Zakarpattia Oblast
- (Hungary) Paks, Tolna County – (Ukraine) Vyshkovo, Zakarpattia Oblast
- (Hungary) Pápa, Veszprém County – (Ukraine) Vyshkovo, Zakarpattia Oblast
- (Hungary) Pesterzsébet, Budapest – (Ukraine) Alushta, Autonomous Republic of Crimea
- (Hungary) Pestszentlőrinc-Pestszentimre, Budapest – (Ukraine) Tiachiv, Zakarpattia Oblast
- (Hungary) Ráckeve, Pest County – (Ukraine) Shom, Zakarpattia Oblast
- (Hungary) Szeged, Csongrád-Csanád County – (Ukraine) Odesa, Odesa Oblast and (Ukraine) Rakhiv, Zakarpattia Oblast
- (Hungary) Székesfehérvár, Fejér County – (Ukraine) Luhansk, Luhansk Oblast
- (Hungary) Szirmabesenyő, Borsod-Abaúj-Zemplén County – (Ukraine) Khust, Zakarpattia Oblast
- (Hungary) Szombathely, Vas County – (Ukraine) Uzhhorod, Zakarpattia Oblast
- (Hungary) Tamási, Tolna County – (Ukraine) Pyiterfolvo, Zakarpattia Oblast
- (Hungary) Tatabánya, Komárom-Esztergom County – (Ukraine) Pyiterfolvo, Zakarpattia Oblast
- (Hungary) Téglás, Hajdú-Bihar County – (Ukraine) Tyihlash, Zakarpattia Oblast
- (Hungary) Tiszaújváros, Borsod-Abaúj-Zemplén County – (Ukraine) Berehove, Zakarpattia Oblast
- (Hungary) Törökszentmiklós, Jász-Nagykun-Szolnok County – (Ukraine) Nevetlenfolu, Zakarpattia Oblast
- (Hungary) Túrkeve, Jász-Nagykun-Szolnok County – (Ukraine) Rakhiv, Zakarpattia Oblast and (Ukraine) Velykyi Bychkiv, Zakarpattia Oblast
- (Hungary) Újbuda, Budapest – (Ukraine) Bene, Zakarpattia Oblast and (Ukraine) Berehove Raion, Zakarpattia Oblast
- (Hungary) Újfehértó, Szabolcs-Szatmár-Bereg County – (Ukraine) Hut, Zakarpattia Oblast
- (Hungary) Vác, Pest County – (Ukraine) Tiachiv, Zakarpattia Oblast
- (Hungary) Várkerület, Budapest – (Ukraine) Mukachevo, Zakarpattia Oblast
- (Hungary) Vásárosnamény, Szabolcs-Szatmár-Bereg County – (Ukraine) Berehove, Zakarpattia Oblast
- (Hungary) Záhony, Szabolcs-Szatmár-Bereg County – (Ukraine) Chop, Zakarpattia Oblast
- (Hungary) Zalaegerszeg, Zala County – (Ukraine) Berehove, Zakarpattia Oblast and Kherson, Kherson Oblast
- (Hungary) Zirc, Veszprém County – (Ukraine) Dertsen, Zakarpattia Oblast

== See also ==
- Foreign relations of Hungary
- Foreign relations of Ukraine
- Hungarians in Ukraine
- Ukrainians in Hungary
- Ukraine–European Union relations
  - Accession of Ukraine to the European Union
- Ukraine–NATO relations
- Hungary–Soviet Union relations
