= Ukrainians in Hungary =

Українці в Угорщині
- (Hungary) (Ukraine)

Total population
- 24,609 (2022 census)

Regions with significant populations
- Szabolcs-Szatmár-Bereg County, Borsod-Abaúj-Zemplén County, Budapest

Languages
- Ukrainian, Rusyn, Hungarian

Religion
- Ukrainian Greek Catholic with Orthodox and Judaism

Related ethnic groups
- Ukrainians, Ukrainians in Slovakia, Ukrainians in Romania

Ukrainians in Hungary (Ukrainian: Українці в Угорщині, Hungarian: Magyarországi ukránok) are a national minority that is mainly concentrated in the Szabolcs-Szatmár-Bereg County and Hungary's capital Budapest.

According to the 2022 Hungarian census, the number of Ukrainians in Hungary increased significantly from 7,396 to 24,609. This increase is not solely attributed to the migration crisis caused by Russia's invasion of Ukraine; many Ukrainians had been working in Hungary before Russia’s invasion.

== Past history ==
In 1910, according to the census, Ruthenians formed approx. 470,000 people (4.69% of the population), but this was before the Treaty of Trianon; after which Hungary lost Transcarpathia to Czechoslovakia. This removed virtually almost all Hungarian land inhabited by them and led to the gradual reduction of the community to its present size.

As a result of the First Vienna Award, the southern part of Transcarpathia became part of Hungary again in 1938. After the breakup of Czechoslovakia in 1939, Hungary occupied and annexed the recently proclaimed Carpathian Ukraine. After the World War II, it was incorporated into the Soviet Union as a part of the province of the Ukrainian Soviet Socialist Republic by the Treaty of Paris in 1947.

The Rusyns descend from Ruthenian peoples who did not adopt the use of the ethnonym "Ukrainian" in the early 20th century. Ukrainians today living in Hungary have Western-Ukrainian and Transcarpathian roots who moved to Hungary in the second half of the 20th century, while Rusyns were a historic minority of the Kingdom of Hungary. In today's Hungary, both Rusyns and Ukrainians are recognized as national minorities, with 3323 and 5633 peoples respectively, according to the 2011 census.

== Present ==
According to the 2001 Hungarian census, there were 5,070 Ukrainians and 1,098 Rusyns in Hungary.

During the 2011 census, respondents could indicate that they belong to two or more ethnicities at once. 5,633 marked that their first ethnic identity was Ukrainian, and 3,323 marked that their first ethnic identity was Rusyn. The total number of people who indicated belonging to the mentioned ethnicities was 7,396 and 3,882, respectively.

According to the 2022 census, there were 24,609 Ukrainians in Hungary.

== See also ==
- Hungary–Ukraine relations
- Hungarians in Ukraine
- Ukrainian diaspora
- Ethnic groups in Hungary
