= Veretskyi Pass =

- Верецький перевал
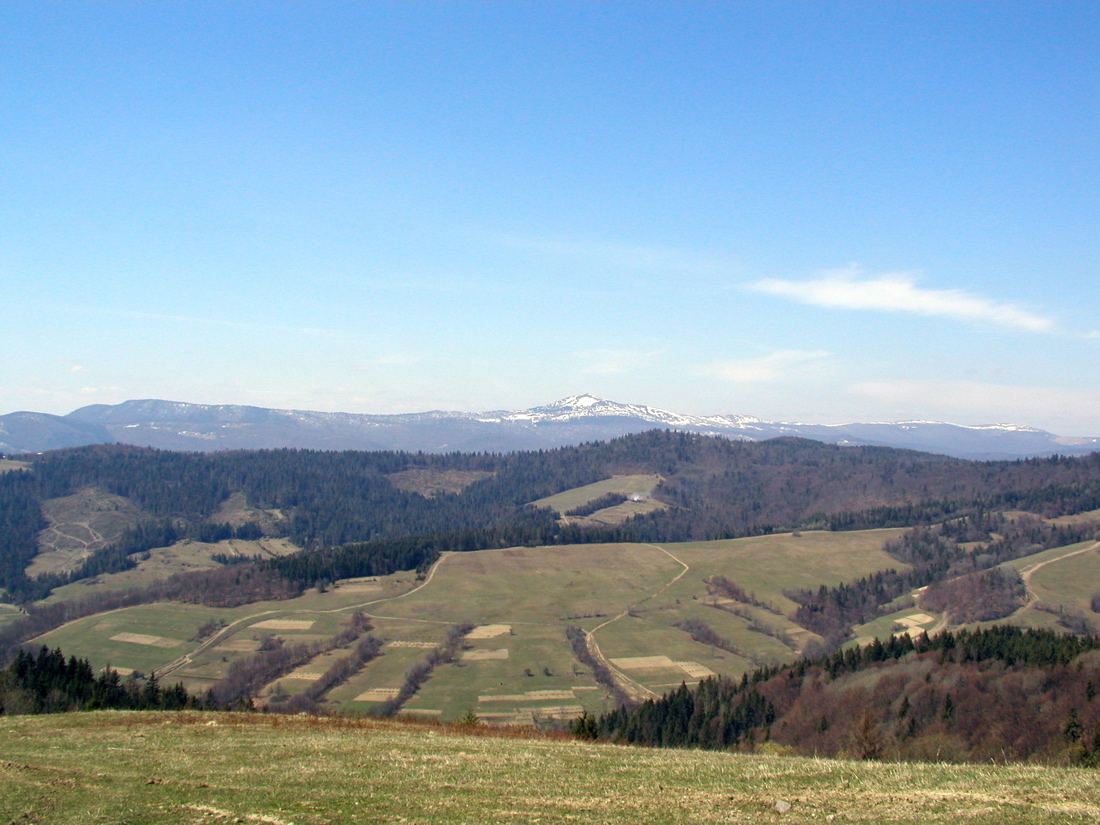
- View from Veretskyi Pass

- Location within Zakarpattia Oblast Location within Lviv Oblast Location within Ukraine
- Elevation: 841 m (2,759 ft)
- Traversed by: Road

Location
- Location: Ukraine
- Range: Carpathians
- Coordinates: 48°49′37.55″N 23°10′32.76″E

Veretskyi Pass or Verecke Pass (Note: Ukrainian: Верецький перевал, romanized: Verec'kyj pereval, more formally: перевал Середньоверецький, pereval Seredn'overec'kyj, also known as: Ворітський перевал, Voric'kyj pereval; Hungarian: Vereckei-hágó) is a mountain pass in Ukraine, one of the most important passes of the Inner Eastern Carpathian Mountains.

== Location ==
The pass is located in the Carpathian Mountains just where the oblasts of Lviv and Transcarpathia meet, on the spine of the Northeastern Carpathians, between the Latorica (or Latorytsia) and Opir river valleys and at the river divide or watershed between the Latorytsia and the Stryi. It has an elevation of 841 meters.

== History ==
The pass has been well-traveled for more than a millennium. In 895 the Hungarian tribes entered the Carpathian Basin and during the next century established the Kingdom of Hungary. In 1241 the main army of the Mongols crossed the pass into the Kingdom of Hungary. In 1703, when Francis Rákóczi II came back from exile at Berezhany Castle in present-day Ukraine, he traveled across Veretskyi Pass into the Hungarian Plain to assume leadership in an anti-Habsburg uprising which became known as Rákóczi's War of Independence. In 1914 during the First World War the pass saw heavy fighting between Austrian-Hungarian troops and those of Tsarist Russia. During World War II the pass was the scene of further battles; the remains of the defensive fortifications of the Árpád Line can still be seen today. Since 1980 the pass has been bypassed by major highways.

In March 1939 the pass was a site of a mass murder of some 600 Ukrainian partisans, the Carpathian Sich (Карпа́тська Січ, Karpatska Sich), who had been fighting against Polish border guards.

In 2008, the Hungarian government received permission from the Ukrainian government to install a monument to the passing of the Hungarian peoples into the future Hungary (in 895). The monument was designed by Hungarian sculptor Péter Matl (Петро Матл) who was born in Mukachevo.

== Gallery ==
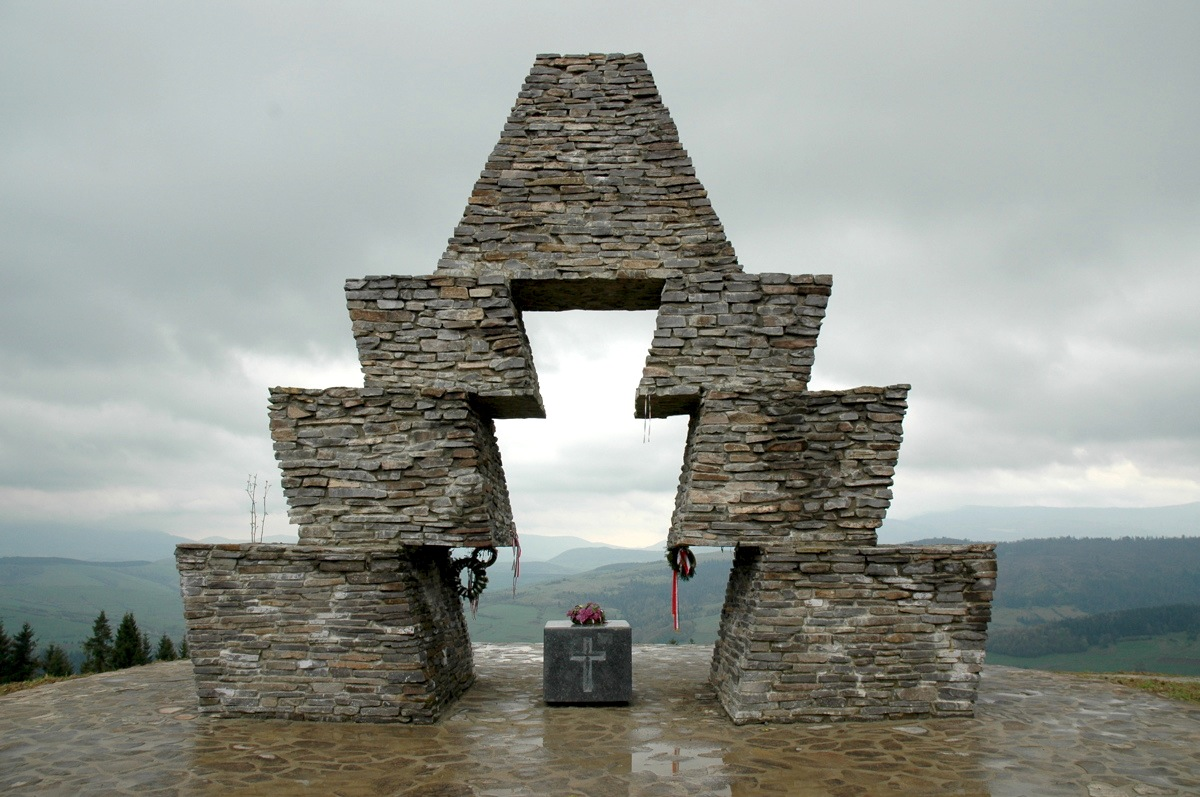
Memorial of the 1100th anniversary of the Hungarian conquest of the Carpathian Basin in 895 (photographed in 2008)

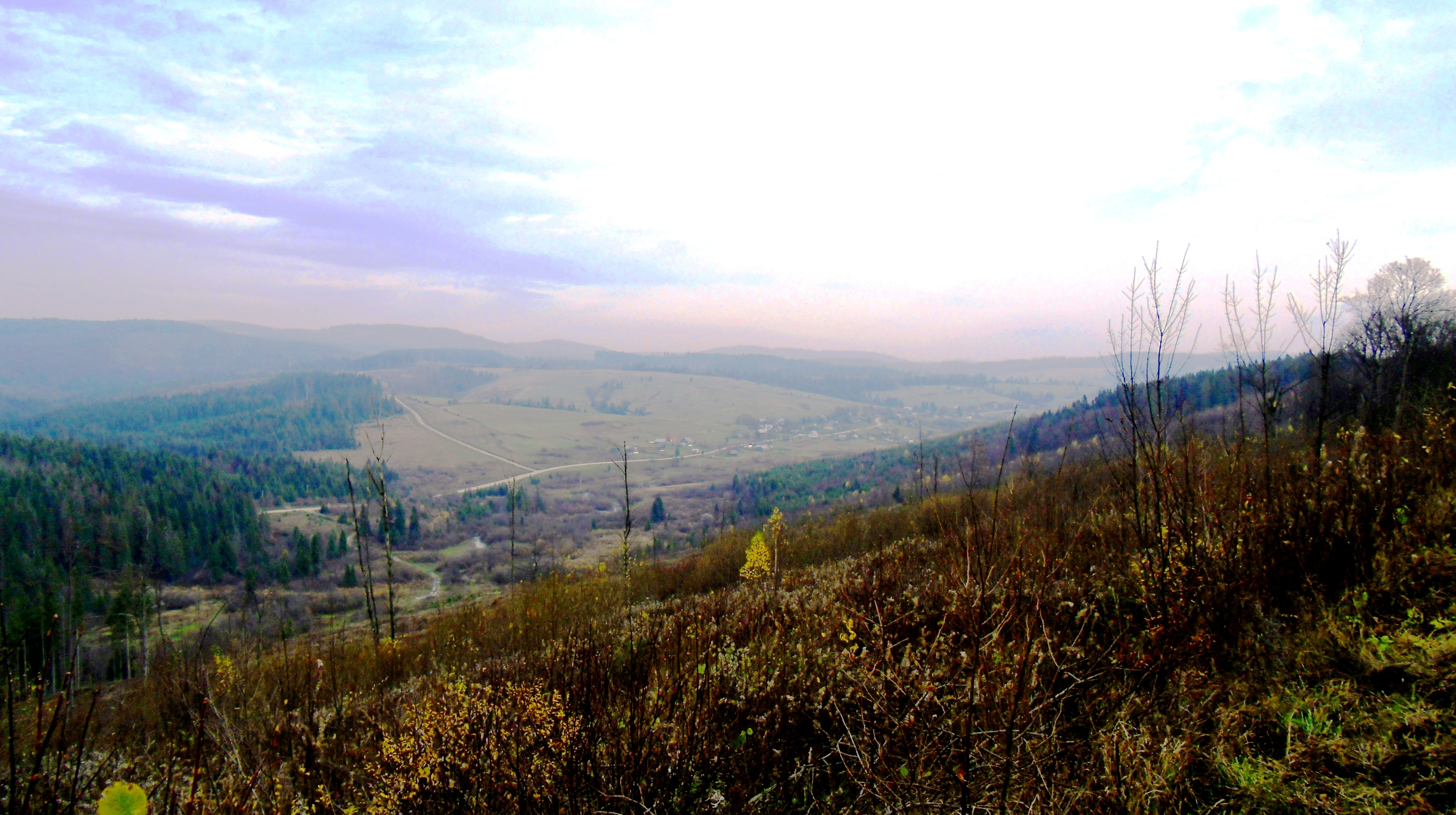
The river Stryi with Veretskyi pass.

== See also ==
- Hungarian conquest of the Carpathian Basin
- Hungary–Ukraine relations
