= Death of József Sebestyén =

2025 death of a Ukrainian-Hungarian man

József Sebestyén
- Born: 10 November 1979; Berehove, Ukrainian SSR, Soviet Union
- Died: 6 July 2025 (aged 45); Berehove, Ukraine
- Cause of death: Beating (denied by Ukraine); Pulmonary embolism (claimed by the Ukrainian General Staff); Heart failure caused by a blood clot (claimed by Zoltán Razsó)
- Resting place: Berehove Cemetery
- Other names: Jozsef Sebestyen; Joseph Shebesten
- Citizenship: Hungarian and Ukrainian
- Known for: Allegedly being beaten to death by Ukrainian recruitment officers
- Children: One son

József Sebestyén (10 November 1979 – 6 July 2025) (Note: Dates listed on his headstone) was an ethnic Hungarian man from Transcarpathia with dual Ukrainian-Hungarian citizenship who was conscripted into the Ukrainian Army during the Russo-Ukrainian war and later died of his injures after he was allegedly beaten with iron bars by Ukrainian officers.

His death was politicized, straining relations between Hungary and Ukraine, and leading to condemnation by several Hungarian officials, who themselves were accused of using the death for propaganda by Ukraine and Deutsche Welle.

== Forced conscription ==
According to his siblings, József was conscripted into the Ukrainian Army on 14 June 2025. According to an eyewitness, József was in front of a café called Parisel when conscription officers repeatedly punched him before dragging him into a vehicle and transporting him to a recruitment center in Uzhhorod, Ukraine. A video later emerged, claiming to depict abuse of József. On 6 July, József died of his wounds in a hospital in Berehove.

== Autopsy ==
According to a statement from the General Staff of the Ukrainian Army, the autopsy of József Sebestyén's body showed that he had died from a pulmonary embolism. They also claimed that the autopsy "found no signs of physical injury indicating violence." According to an investigation by Hungarian newspaper Index, the forensic expert who performed the autopsy, Josip Akar, was being blackmailed by the SBU after he intervened in order to prevent his son from being conscripted. Index also reported that Akar had falsified the autopsy report in exchange for his son's release. Zoltán Razsó, a nurse in the Ukrainian Army, claimed that he was working in ward four when József Sebestyén died in ward two. When Razsó asked his colleagues what had happened, he claimed that they told him that Sebestyén had died in the bathroom after his heart had stopped beating due to a blood clot.

== Reactions and consequences ==
The death of József Sebestyén has caused Hungary–Ukraine relations to become further strained. Deutsche Welle reported that the incident "fuels Orban's agitation" and that "Viktor Orbán and his apparatus portrayed the neighboring country as a mafia state full of criminal and dangerous hordes that would rob, kidnap and kill Hungarian people." According to DW research, Orban's campaign against Ukraine following the death included usage of fake videos.

On 10 July 2025, Hungary's Ministry of Foreign Affairs summoned Ukrainian ambassador to Hungary, Sándor Fegyir in response to József's death.

On 11 July, the Ukrainian Ministry of Foreign Affairs, denied that József Sebestyén had been beaten to death and claimed that Hungarian media reports about the incident, "play along with Russian propaganda".

On 12 July, a candlelight vigil was held for József Sebestyén in front of the Ukrainian embassy in Budapest. Notable people in attendance included Hungarian deputy Prime Minister Zsolt Semjén and Zsolt Bayer, a controversial journalist with pro-Russian sentiments who is also a co-founder of the right wing Fidesz party. After speeches the crowd sang the Hungarian national anthem and placed candles next to the embassy. Hungarian neurosurgeon András Csókay compared József's death to the execution of Bishop Theodore Romzha, a Catholic Bishop who was executed by the NKVD on 27 October 1947 after he was beaten by iron bars and then subsequently poisoned.

On 16 July, Hungarian Prime Minister Orbán called on the European Union to impose sanctions against Ukrainian officials in response to the death of József Sebestyén.

On 6 August, Hungarian Foreign Minister Péter Szijjártó made a statement which read, "In a civilized, normal country, there is an immediate prosecution, the perpetrators are immediately caught and their bosses, who approved it, are immediately imprisoned, and this practice is stopped. Now, such a country has no place in the European Union, let alone in the civilized world. To date, not a single word has been uttered from Brussels against forced labor… This is an acknowledgement by Brussels that they condone it." On 8 August 2025, the Ukrainian State Bureau of Investigation denied Szijjártó claims and stated that they are "manipulative and not in line with reality".

On 10 August, Hungarian Minister for Culture and Innovation Balazs Hanko, visited the grave of József Sebestyén and layed a wreath during the wreath-laying ceremony. He made a post on Facebook about the ceremony which read, "We paid our respects at the grave of Jozsef Sebestyen, who paid the ultimate price — his life — because he refused to take up arms in the war, and who was beaten to death during forced conscription in Ukraine. His tragic fate cries out to remind us that violence can never be the way forward, and that war is not a solution. It is unacceptable and deeply inhumane. We Hungarians stand with every one of our Hungarian brothers and sisters who suffer injustice and oppression. We stand with the family of Jozsef Sebestyen. We defend human dignity and raise our voices against bloodshed. Ukraine's EU accession cannot be on the agenda under such circumstances. We consistently demand peace, and we consistently say no to war!"

On 1 December, Sebestyén's sister Márta Sebestyén, gave a speech at what the Hindustan Times described as an anti-war event in Nyíregyháza. Márta's speech was shared online by Prime Minister Orbán. She added that her brother's grave had become "a place of pilgrimage". She also said that since her brother's funeral, many people have texted and called her, including Minister of Culture and Innovation Balázs Hankó.
