= Hungary–Soviet Union relations =

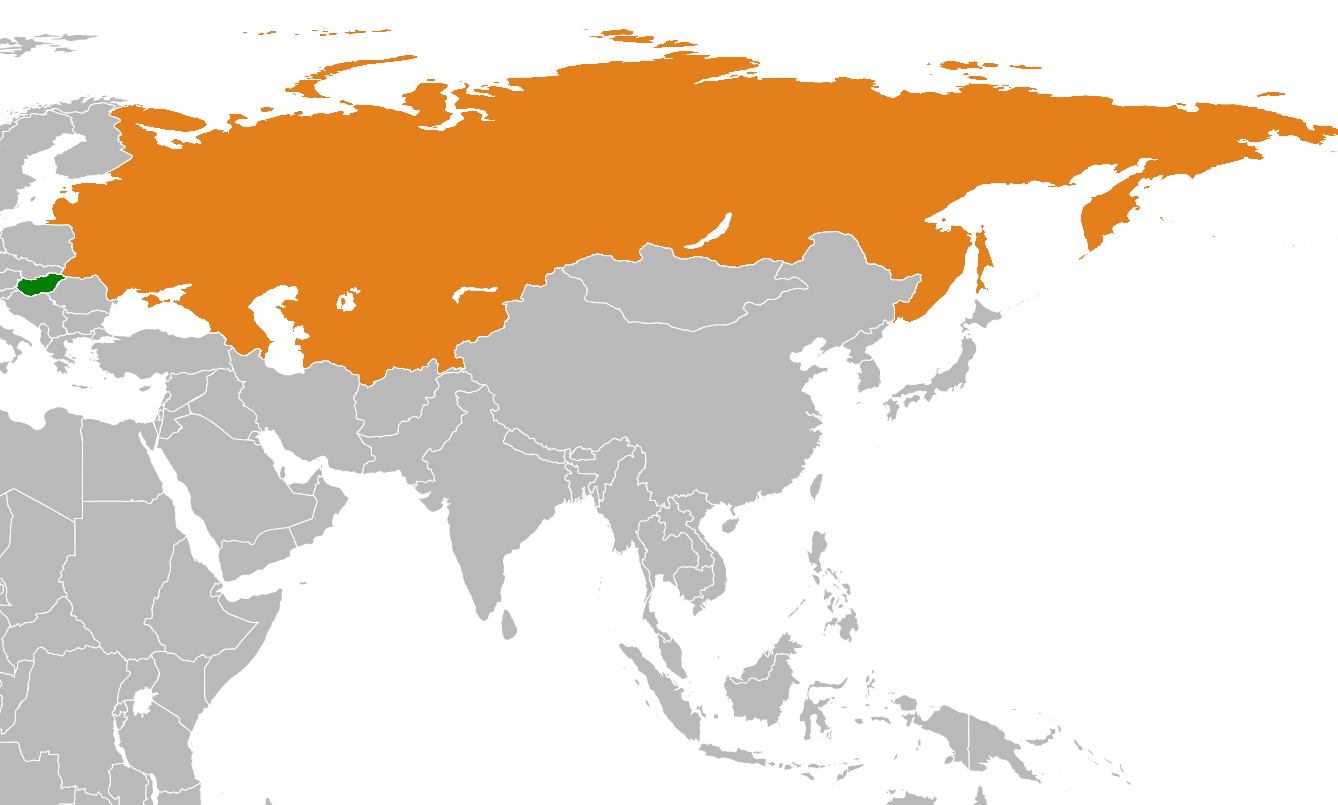

- Hungary: Soviet Union

Hungary–Soviet Union relations developed in three phases. After a short period when Béla Kun ruled a Soviet Republic, the Horthy era saw an almost complete break in relations until after World War II. The Yalta Conference, however, created conditions that ensured political, economic, and cultural interventions by the Soviet Union in internal Hungarian politics for the 45 years of the Cold War. Hungary became a member of the Warsaw Pact in 1955; since the end of World War II, Soviet troops were stationed in the country, intervening at the time of the Hungarian Revolution of 1956. Starting in March 1990, the Soviet Army began leaving Hungary, with the last troops being withdrawn on June 19, 1991.

== First Republic and Hungarian Soviet Republic ==
During the short reign of Mihály Károlyi, the fact that faith in Woodrow Wilson’s Fourteen Points had brought Károlyi nothing meant that in February of 1919 he looked to a rapprochement with the new Russian Soviet Federative Socialist Republic and its allied Party of Communists in Hungary. When Károlyi failed again to moderate Allied demands for large territorial cessions following the Vix Note, his Social Democratic Party would ally with the Party of Communists under Béla Kun, who would make policies based upon communications with Russian leader Vladimir Lenin.

== Counterrevolution and Horthy regime ==
Kun’s regime quickly became very unpopular and would be overthrown in the Hungarian-Romanian War of 1919. A counterrevolutionary White Terror would ensue, and the pre-war ruling clique of aristocrats, civil servants and army officers would be restored. Miklós Horthy de Nagybánya would be elected Regent after the monarchy was restored — former King Charles IV was unable to retake the throne before he died in 1922.

Having come to power in a counterrevolution against the Soviet Republic, Horthy’s rule would become firmly, even fanatically opposed to the Soviet Union. The Communist Party would be declared illegal immediately after its overthrow, while it was 1934 before the USSR would again be recognised as a legitimate government, and May 1935 before diplomatic relations were established. The rapproachment would be ended when Hungary reacquired Ruthenia, which Stalin had a strong interest in, with the result that diplomatic ties would be suspended in the spring of 1939. In November 1940 István Csáky would be warned again, this time by Adolf Hitler, that Stalin was interested in seizing Ruthenia and possibly other areas of Hungary.

=== World War II ===
At the beginning of the plans for Operation Barbarossa. Hungary was not expected to join the Wehrmacht in its struggle against Bolshevism. However, soon afterwards Horthy would become entangled in an alliance with Nazi Germany and Hungary would participate in the invasion. However, all Hungary′s territorial demands were against Yugoslavia rather than the Soviet Union, while it has been argued that Horthy was the first Axis leader to recognise that the Soviet Union was not going to collapse under the Axis invasion. For a time Stalin considered Hungary no longer involved in the war against his regime. However, a new cabinet in 1942 was much less enthusiastic about fighting the war. but Horthy was always under the impression the Third Reich needed more troops which he offered in the winter.

By 1943–1944, the tide of World War II had turned. The Red Army regained the pre-war Soviet territory, and advanced westward from its borders to defeat Nazi Germany and its allies, including Hungary. Officially, Soviet military operations in Hungary ended on 4 April 1945, when the last German troops were expelled, although Soviet troops (and political advisers) remained within the country. In the secret percentages agreement signed by British Prime Minister Winston Churchill and Soviet First Secretary Joseph Stalin at the Fourth Moscow Conference dividing Eastern Europe into British and Soviet spheres of interest, the Soviet Union was granted 80 percent of influence in Hungary.

== Forced labor of Hungarians in the Soviet Union ==
During the period of Soviet occupation of Hungary in World War II (1944–45) under a system known in Hungary as malenki robot (Russian for "little work") it is estimated that up to 600,000 Hungarians (of which up to 200,000 were civilians) were captured by the occupying Soviets and deported to labour camps in the Soviet Union – of those deported, up to 200,000 perished. The first deported Hungarians started to return to Hungary in June 1946, with the last returning in the years 1953-1955, after Stalin's death. The Soviet policy of deportations for forced labor extended to other occupied nations, however no other Soviet occupied nation was hit as hard as Hungary – for comparison, it is estimated that 155,000 to 218,000 Germans were deported from mainland Germany.

== The Hungarian Revolution of 1956 ==
The Hungarian Revolution of 1956 was a spontaneous nationwide revolt against the Communist government of Hungary and its Soviet-imposed policies. After announcing their willingness to negotiate the withdrawal of the Soviet Armed Forces, the Soviet Politburo changed its mind and moved to crush the revolution. On November 4, 1956, a large joint military force of the Warsaw Pact, led by Moscow, entered Budapest to crush the armed resistance.

The Soviet intervention, codenamed "Operation Whirlwind", was launched by Marshal Ivan Konev. The five Soviet divisions stationed in Hungary before October 23 in the first intervention ("Operation Wave") were augmented to a total strength of 17 divisions. The 8th Mechanized Army under command of Lieutenant General Hamazasp Babadzhanian and the 38th Army under command of Lieutenant General Hadzhi-Umar Mamsurov from the nearby Carpathian Military District were deployed to Hungary for the operation. This second intervention came after three days of deception. The Russians negotiated with the Hungarians (the so-called mixed commission headed by Pál Maléter) about the withdrawal of Soviet troops on the island of Tököl, but at the same time flew János Kádár and Ferenc Münnich secretly to the Soviet Union on November 1 to establish a new pro-Soviet Hungarian government.

At 3:00 a.m. on November 4, Soviet tanks penetrated Budapest along the Pest side of the Danube in two thrusts—one from the south, and one from the north—thus splitting the city in half. Armored units crossed into Buda, and at 4:25 a.m. fired the first shots at the Hungarian People's Army barracks on Budaörsi road. Soon after, Soviet artillery and tank fire was heard in all districts of Budapest. Operation Whirlwind combined air strikes, artillery, and the coordinated tank-infantry action of 17 divisions. By 8:00 am organised defence of the city evaporated after the radio station was seized, and many defenders fell back to fortified positions. Hungarian civilians bore the brunt of the fighting, and it was often impossible for Soviet troops to differentiate military from civilian targets. For this reason, Soviet tanks often crept along main roads firing indiscriminately into buildings. Hungarian resistance was strongest in the industrial areas of Budapest, which were heavily targeted by Soviet artillery and air strikes. Soviet Army officers, largely unable to speak Hungarian, began indiscriminately arresting anyone showing resistance, including sixty-eight minors, among them nine young girls, pro-Soviet Hungarian officers, and German employees of the Red Cross. According to KGB Chairman Ivan Serov's report on November 11, as many as 3,773 insurgents were arrested, and by November 13, the number grew to 4,056. Several hundreds were illegally deported by train to Uzhgorod (Ungvár) in Soviet Ukraine and transported to several prisons in Stryi, Drohobych, Chernivtsi, and Stanislav (Ivano-Frankivsk). After international protests by the United Nations, they were transported back to Hungary in December. Within Hungary, the last pocket of resistance called for ceasefire on 10 November. Over 2,500 Hungarians and 722 Soviet troops had been killed and thousands more were wounded.

== After the Hungarian Revolution ==
The crushing of the Hungarian Revolution strengthened Soviet control over the Eastern Bloc. The Soviets had Imre Nagy replaced as Prime Minister of Hungary with János Kádár, the leader of the Hungarian Socialist Workers' Party. Nagy, with a few others, was given sanctuary in the Yugoslav Embassy. In spite of a written safe conduct of free passage by János Kádár, on 22 November 1956, Nagy was arrested by the Soviet forces as he was leaving the Yugoslav Embassy, and taken to Snagov, Romania. Subsequently, the Soviets returned him to Hungary, where he was secretly charged with organizing to overthrow the Hungarian people's democratic state and with treason. Nagy was secretly tried, found guilty, sentenced to death, and executed by hanging in June 1958. According to Fedor Burlatsky, a Kremlin insider, Soviet Premier Nikita Khrushchev had Nagy executed, "as a lesson to all other leaders in socialist countries."

== End of Soviet military presence ==
In the wake of the Revolutions of 1989, the Soviet troops – the Southern Group of Forces – started leaving Hungary. By July 1990, some 15,000 Soviet soldiers and their dependents had left, taking about 60,000 of the 560,000 tons of equipment they had stored there. There were 5,750 buildings left on the 60 army camps and 10 air bases maintained by the Soviet Army in Hungary. The Soviets reportedly asked for 50 billion forints (some 800 million US dollars at the time), as compensation for the "Soviet investment" in Hungary; the then-commander of Soviet troops in Hungary, Col. Gen. Matvey Burlakov (succeeded by Lt. Gen. Shilov), said that the troop withdrawals may be held up if the Hungarians refused to pay.

The remaining 40,000 Soviet troops left Hungary, starting in March 1990, with the last leaving on June 19, 1991.

== See also ==
- Hungary–Russia relations
- Hungary–Ukraine relations
- Soviet occupation of Hungary
- Werckmeister Harmonies
