= Vynohradiv Raion =

Former subdivision of Zakarpattia Oblast, Ukraine

Coordinates: 48°08′N 23°00′E

Vynohradiv Raion Виноградівський район
- Raion
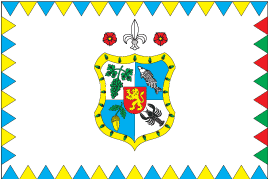
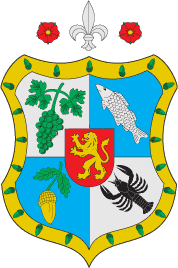
- Flag Coat of arms

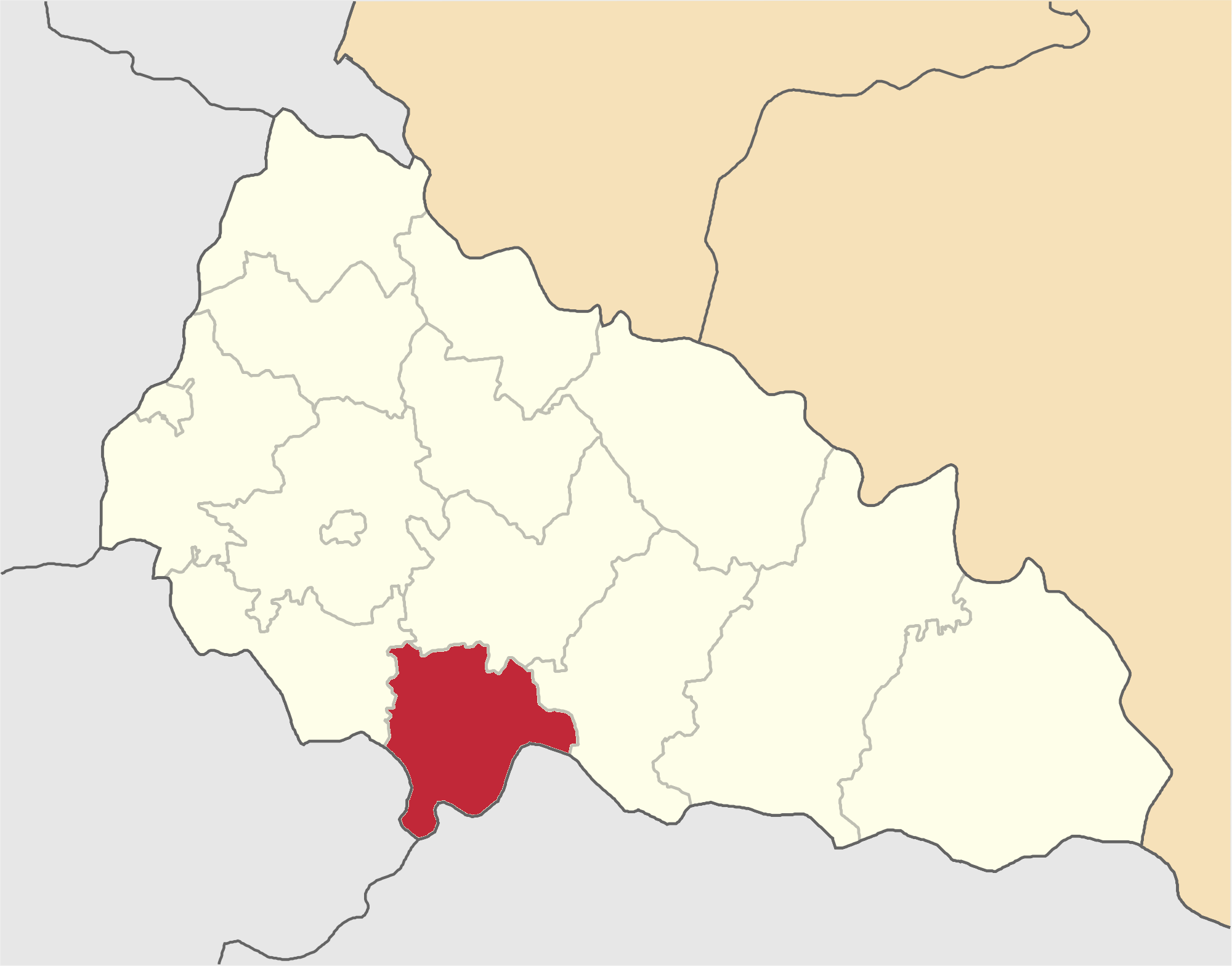
- Country: Ukraine
- Oblast: Zakarpattia Oblast
- Disestablished: 18 July 2020
- Admin. center: Vynohradiv
- Subdivisions: List: — city councils; — settlement councils; — rural councils; Number of localities: — cities; — urban-type settlements; 47 — villages; — rural settlements

Area
  - Total: 697 km^{2} (269 sq mi)

Population (2020)
  - Total: 120,795
  - Density: 173/km^{2} (449/sq mi)
- Time zone: UTC+02:00 (EET)
  - Summer (DST): UTC+03:00 (EEST)
- Area code: 380-3134
- Website: http://rajrada.sevlush.net

Vynohradiv Raion (Note: Ukrainian: Виноградівський район; Hungarian: Nagyszőlősi járás; German: Rajon Wynohradiw; Romanian: Raionul Vînohradiv; Rusyn: Виноградівскый район; Russian: Виноградовский район; Slovak: Vynohradivský rajón) was a raion of Zakarpattia Oblast in western Ukraine. Its administrative center was the city of Vynohradiv. The raion was abolished and its territory was merged into Berehove Raion on 18 July 2020 as part of the administrative reform of Ukraine, which reduced the number of raions of Zakarpattia Oblast to six. The last estimate of the raion population was 120,795 (2020 est.).

== Gallery ==
Coat of arms of Hungarian Ugocsa County

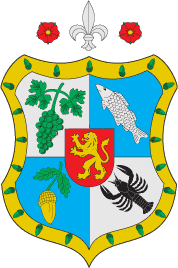
Coat of arms of Ukrainian Vynohradiv Raion

== See also ==
- Administrative divisions of Zakarpattia Oblast
