= Diósy de Tótdiós =

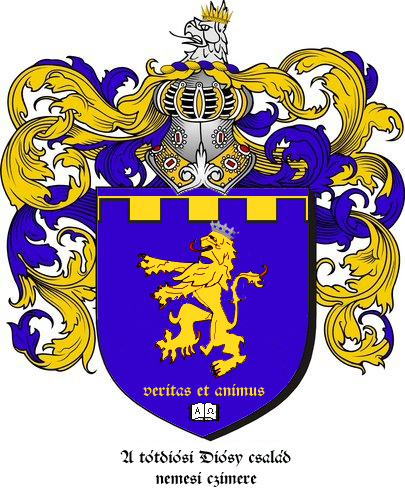
Diósy de Tótdiós coat of arms featuring family motto "Veritas et Animus"

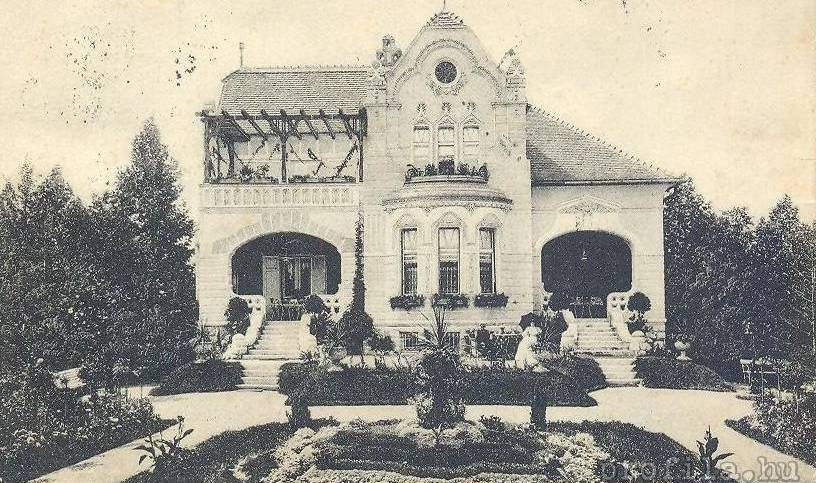
The Diósy villa

The Diósy de Tótdiós family (shorter forms: Diósy or Dióssy) was a Hungarian noble house. The Diósy name comes from the old name of Tótdiós (Dyos), which means "walnut grove" in Hungarian.

== History ==
In 1336, András gained nobility by serving king Charles I (Hungarian: Károly Róbert) of Hungary bravely, and got the villages of Tótdiós (Slovak: Orešany) in Nyitra (Slovak: Nitra), Garbócbogdány (Slovak: Bohdanovce) in Kassa (Slovak: Kosice), Koksóbaksa (Slovak: Kokšov-Bakša) in Kassa (Slovak: Kosice) and Nagyörvistye (Slovak: Veľké Orvište) in Nagyszombat (Slovak: Trnava) county, and their surroundings as a gift.

In 1634, the members of the family became barons of the Holy Roman Empire by serving the king Ferdinand II of Hungary in the Thirty Years' War; and afterwards, they were mentioned as barons even in documents issued by the Kings of Hungary although this title was not recognised in the kingdom at that time.

After the Treaty of Trianon, the family moved to Bonyhád, Hungary. Every member of the family who fought in the Second World War came back alive and healthy. In 1947, the family lost all of its lands due to the Communist takeover in Hungary. Branches of family are still living in Hungary mostly in Budapest and Slovakia. In addition, the Italian branch of the family lives in Parma while other descendents of the original branch live in the United States today. Part of family lives also in Vojvodina, Serbia.

== Famous members of the family ==
- György Diósy (1354–1395) - Granger of Nyitra
- Mihály Diósy (160?-164?) - Second lieutenant
- Márton Diósy (1818–1892) - Personal secretary of Lajos Kossuth
- Arthur Diosy (1856–1923) - Founder of the Japan-British Society
- Lajos Diósy (1867–1922) - Pharmacist
- Daniel Dioši (1975-) - Chief regional horticulturist

== See also ==
- List of titled noble families in the Kingdom of Hungary
- Nobility in the Kingdom of Hungary
