= Baksa =

Baksa may refer to:

== Places ==
- Baisha, Taishan, Guangdong Province, China
- Baksa district, Assam, India
- Baksa, Nepal
- Baksa, Hungary (Croatian: Bokšica)
- Bocșa, Sălaj (Hungarian: Oláhbaksa), in Sălaj County, Transylvania, Romania
- Kokšov-Bakša (Hungarian: Koksóbaksa, Koksó-Baksa), a village and municipality in Košice-okolie District, Kosice Region, Slovakia
- Baksa, Syria, a village in northwestern Syria near Latakia
- Baksa, Hooghly, a census town, in West Bengal, India

== People ==
- Baksa (name), a surname and title
- Shannon Baksa or Shannon McRandle (born 1969), American model and makeup artist

== See also ==
- Baksho Rahashya (disambiguation)
