= Károlyi Castle (Füzérradvány) =

Castle in Füzérradvány, Hungary

- Károlyi-kastély
- Füzérradvány, Sátoraljaújhely District, Borsod-Abaúj-Zemplén County, Hungary
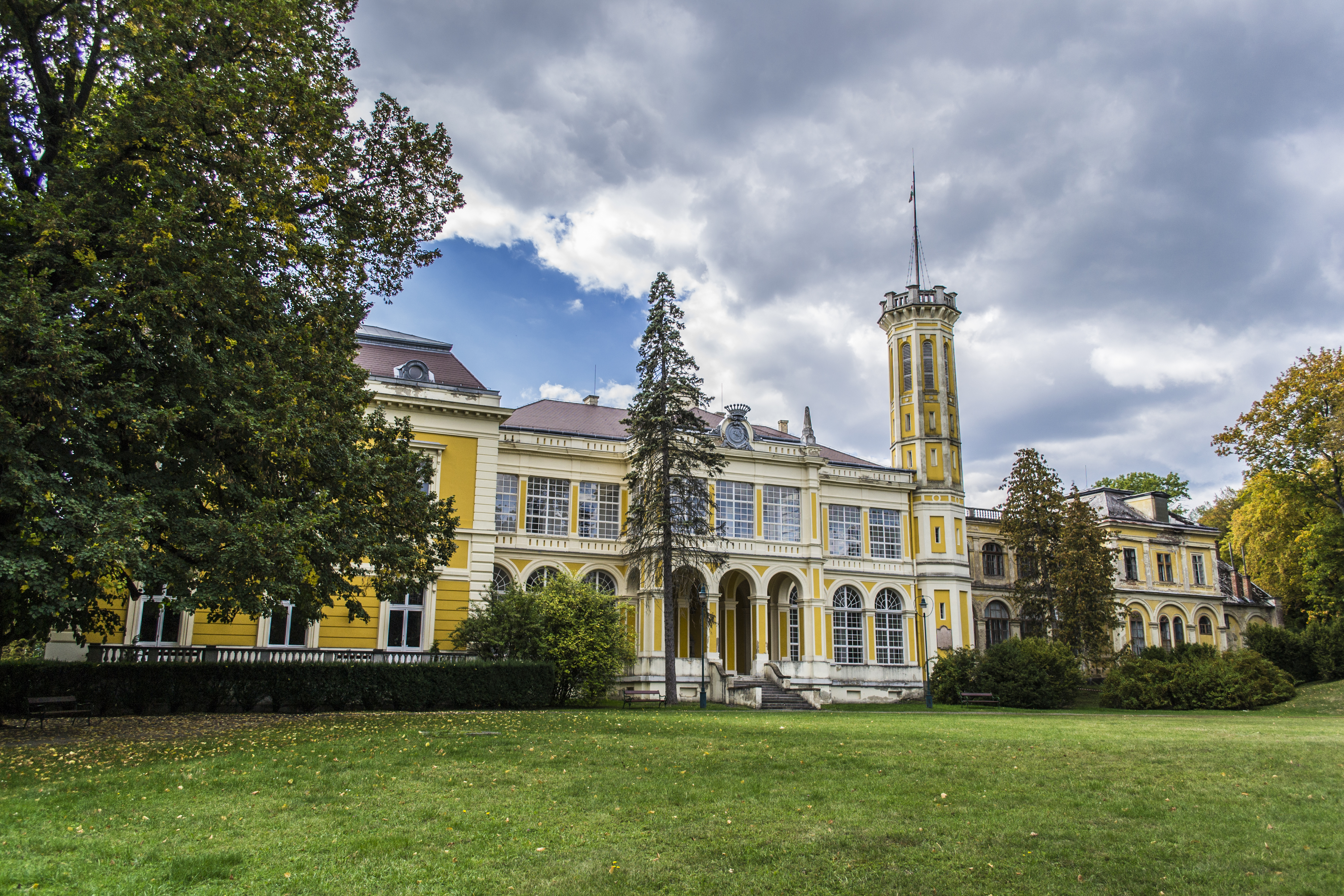
- The Castle, October 2010

Site information
- Type: Castle
- Owner: Government of Hungary
- Open to the public: Yes

Location
- Location of Károlyi Castle in Hungary
- Coordinates: 48°29′3.41″N 21°31′42.42″E

Site history
- Built: 16th century 1860–1870
- Built for: Károlyi family
- Architect: Miklós Ybl

Károlyi Castle is a 19th-century castle located in Füzérradvány, Sátoraljaújhely District, Borsod-Abaúj-Zemplén County, Hungary. The castle was built by Péter Réthey at the end of the 16th century. The castle and estate were given to László Károlyi by Leopold I in 1686. The Károlyi Castle, which dates back to the 16th century, was rebuilt in a romantic-eclectic style based on the plans of Miklós Ybl between 1860 and 1870, while its interior is in the Italian Renaissance style.

== History ==
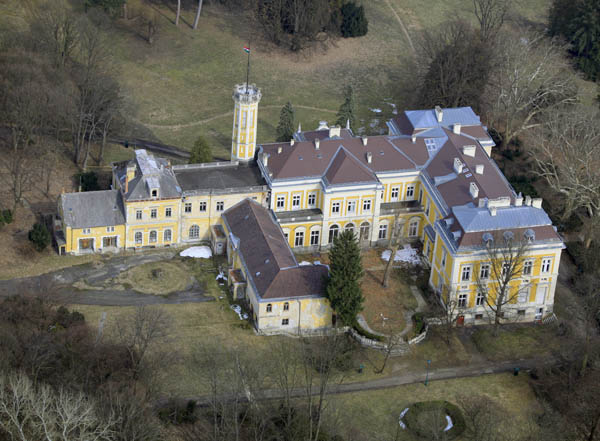
Aerial photograph of the castle, March 2010

In 1614, the Füzérradvány estate was owned by Pál Nádasdy, but by 1620 it had passed to Péter Réthey. In a 1626 will, his widow bequeathed the Füzérradvány manor, built in the style of a castle, to their daughter, Zsófia Réthey, and her husband, Imre Mosdóssy, further obligating her to finish the construction of the Füzérradvány church. Zsófia Réthey, who lived in the castle with Ferenc Jékei Buly at the time. Between 1674 and 1680, Füzérradvány belonged to András Hartyáni as a royal gift, and to the treasury in 1680, but it continued to be used by the widow's second husband and his son, Mihály Várady. The castle and estate were donated by Leopold I to László Károlyi in 1686. In 1702, Károlyi's son, Baron Sándor Károlyi, acquired the Füzérradvány estate from the chamber for 5,000 HUF. In 1717, Sándor Károlyi mortgaged Füzérradvány, together with the castle and the villages, to Baron General Imre Dessewffy for 30 years for 5,000 HUF. From 1734, Dessewffy's son Ferenc Dessewffy, the Lord Lieutenant of Abaúj County, lived on the estate. In 1754, Count Ferenc Károlyi redeemed Füzérradvány.

In a 1717 description of the castle, it describes the building thoroughly, reflecting its uninhabited, doorless condition, which can be compared to what can be read from the line drawing taken in 1702. The castle was "L" shaped, with wings facing south and east, with a closed observation balcony at each of its three corners. In 1752, Count Ferenc Károlyi had a plan of the castle made, which returned to the Károlyi family in 1754, but was again leased to István Péchy.

During the ownership of Count Ede Károlyi, the late Renaissance castle built by Réthey was almost entirely demolished and rebuilt between 1846 until 1877. Count Ede the first Károlyi to choose Radvány as his permanent residence. An amateur designer, the Count asked Miklós Ybl, his family's preferred architect, to create the new, U-shaped castle with two wings connecting to it from the north.

The octagonal tower was designed by Count Ede Károlyi. According to Ervin Ybl's notes, his family constantly mocked Count Ede for the design, calling him a "stubborn" because of his tall, narrow, and rather disproportionate appearance. Between 1897 and 1902, Count László Károlyi had the southern residential wing of the castle rebuilt according to architect Albert Pio's plans, who also made plans in 1907. Between 1898 and 1913, Count László Károlyi and his wife, Countess Franciska Apponyi, purchased complete Renaissance fireplaces, door frames, and carvings primarily in Florence, from the art dealer Stefano Bardini, and in Paris, which were installed in the castle. They also purchased Renaissance and late Renaissance furniture and objects d'art, creating a museum-like interior.

Between 1936 and 1938, while owned by Count István Károlyi, the building was transformed into a luxury castle hotel based on the plans of György Lehoczky, who also designed the pavilions in the castle park. At that time, the upstairs rooms were divided into suites, and tennis, ski and golf courses, as well as beach and apartment houses were built in the park. The luxury hotel, surrounded by an impressive park, opened its doors to visitors in 1938 and, with an interruption, operated by the family until 1948.

=== Post World War II ===
After the nationalization in 1949, a hospital was set up at the castle, and, later, a sanatorium was located within its walls.

Between 2018 and 2021, within the framework of the National Castle Program, the complex renovation of the castle as a historic monument and its development into a tourist attraction was carried out as an investment by the NÖF National Heritage Protection Development Nonprofit Ltd.

== Gallery ==
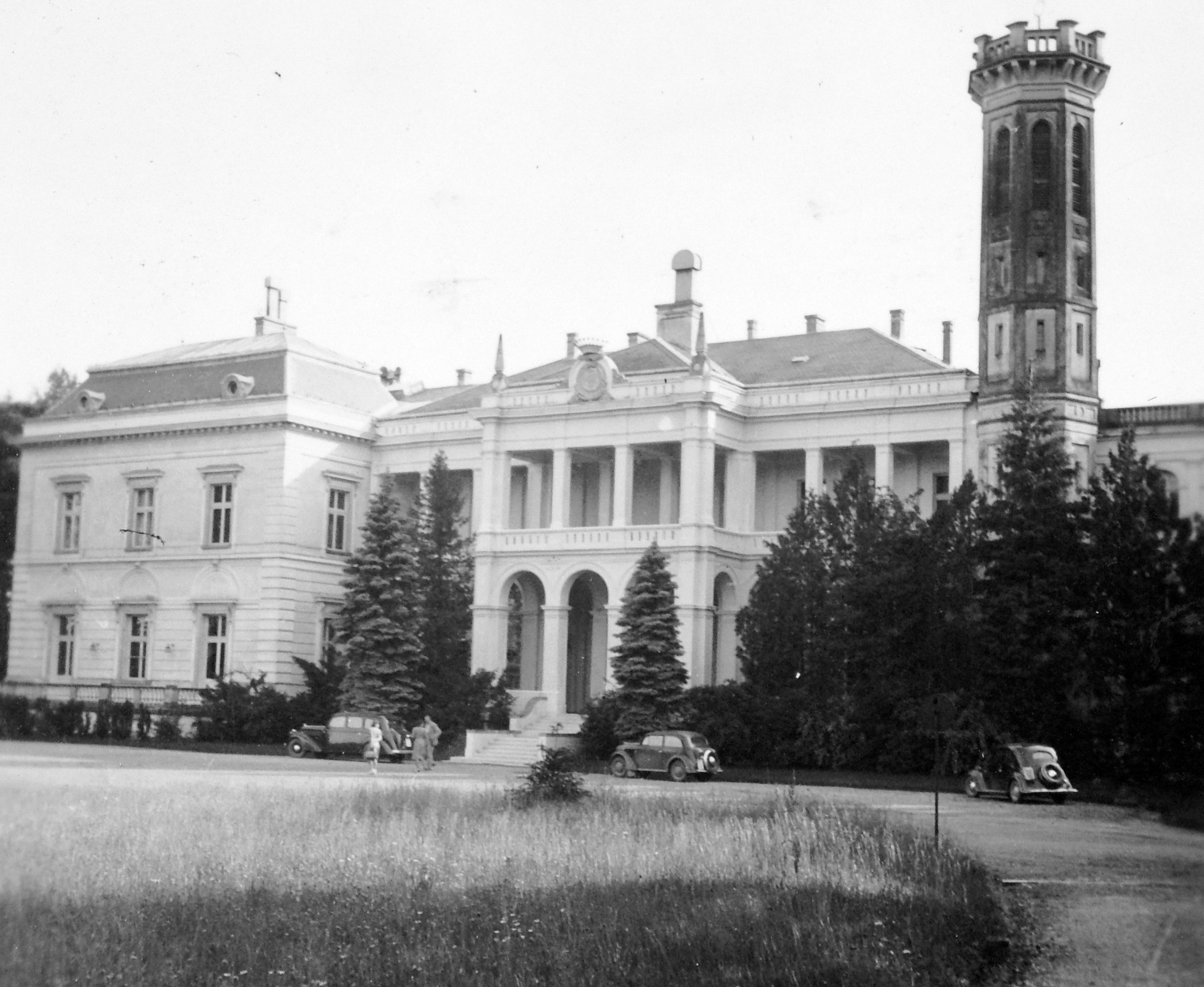
1940 photograph

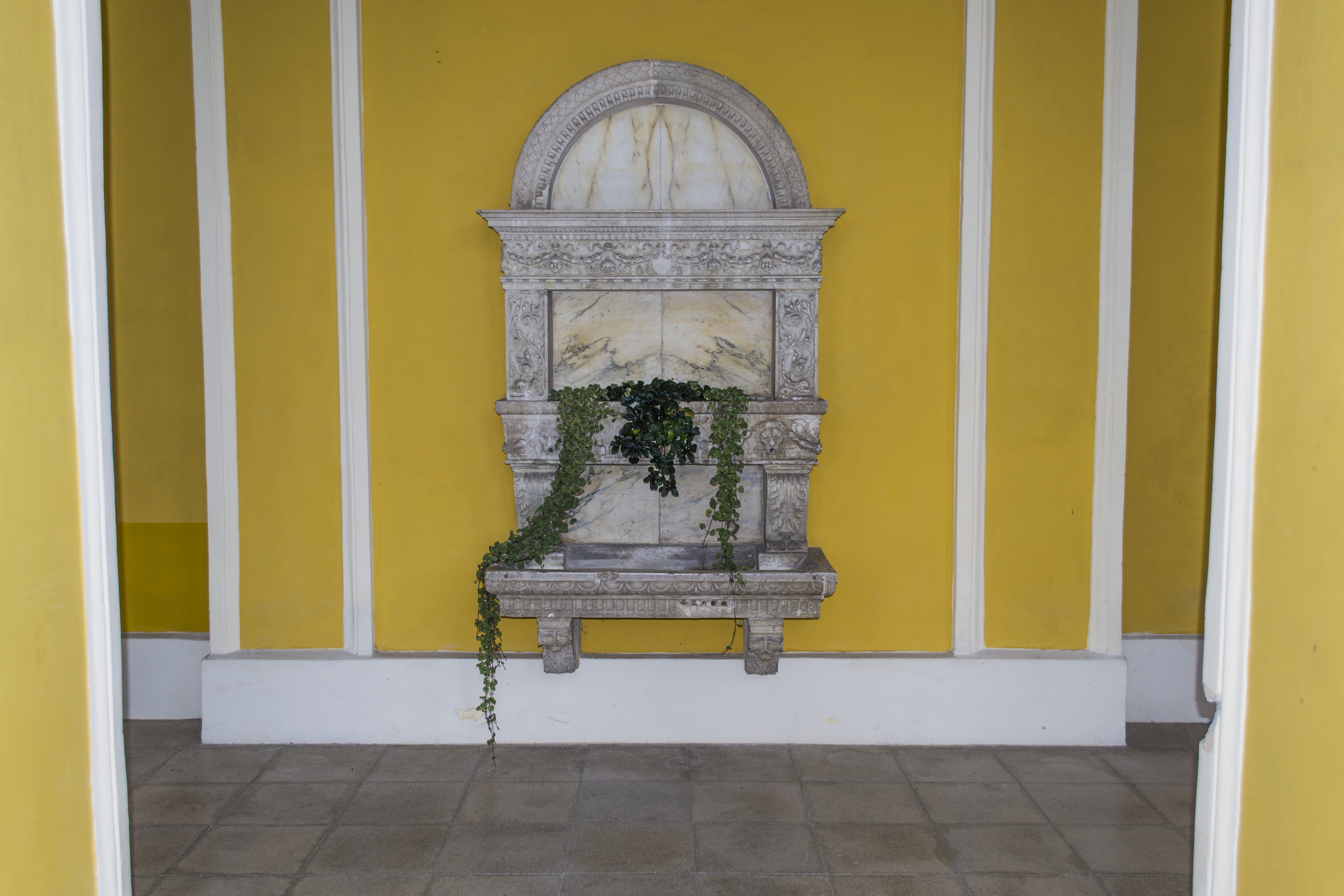
Exterior detail

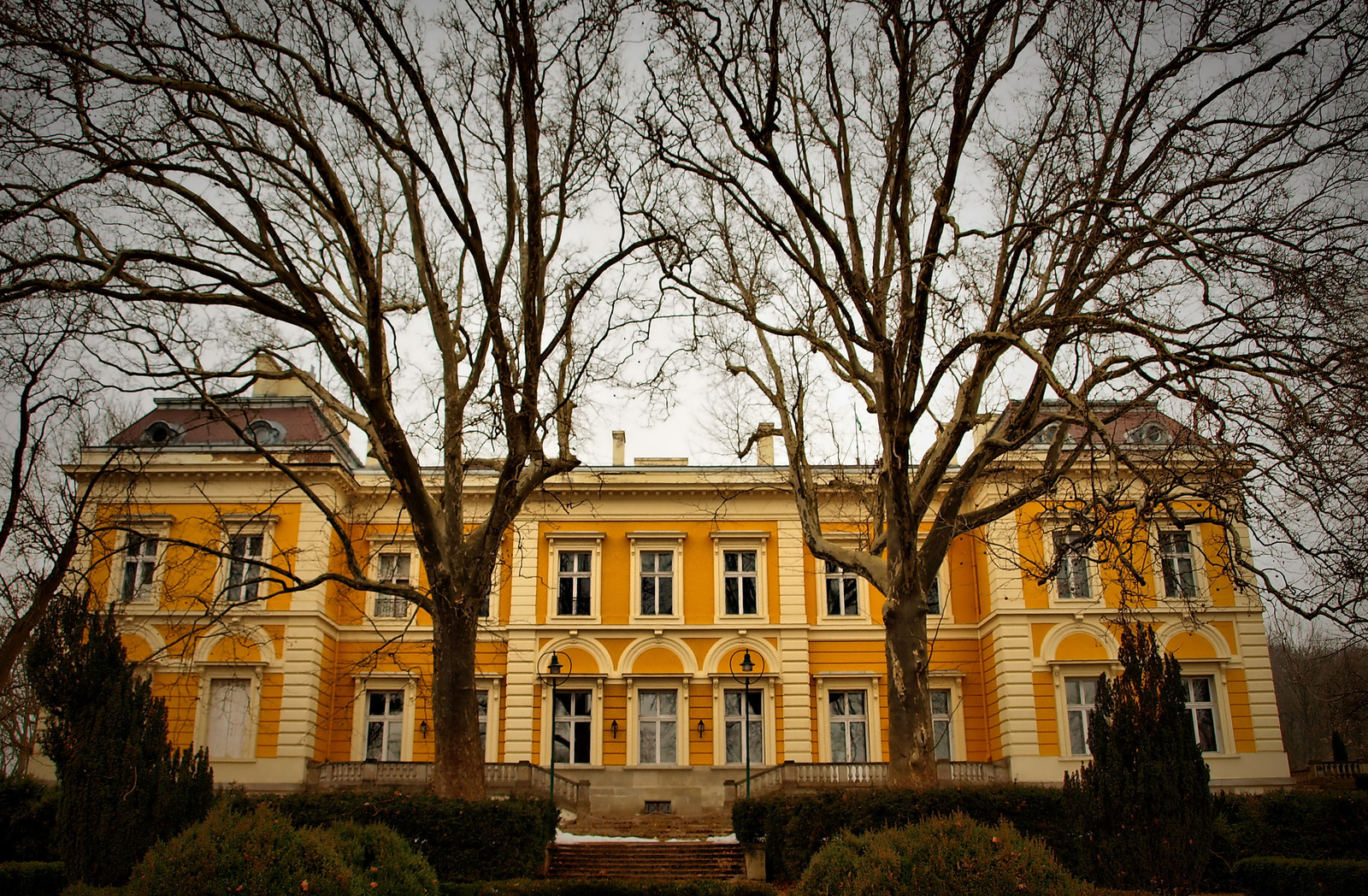
View of the tower

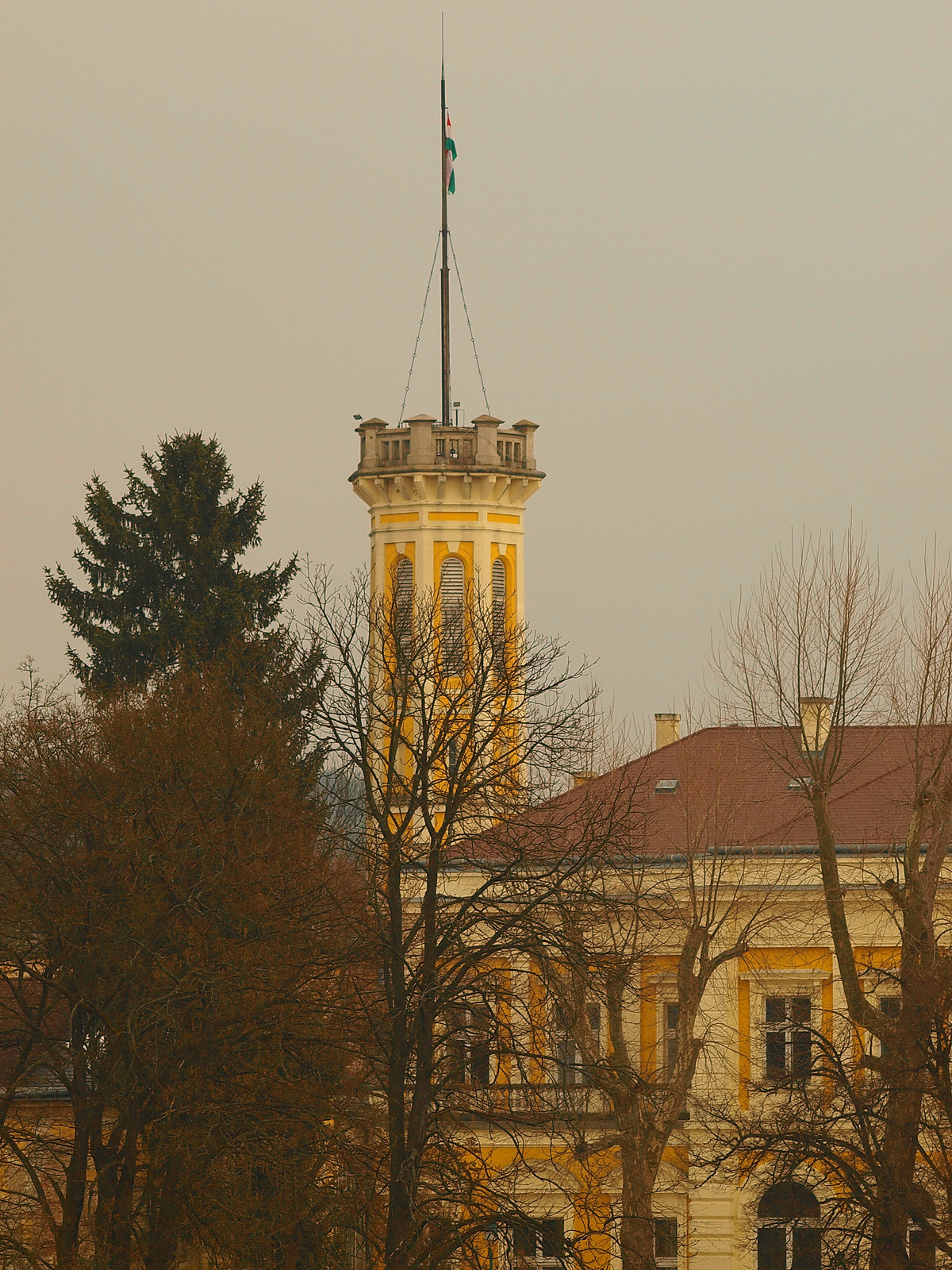
Rear view

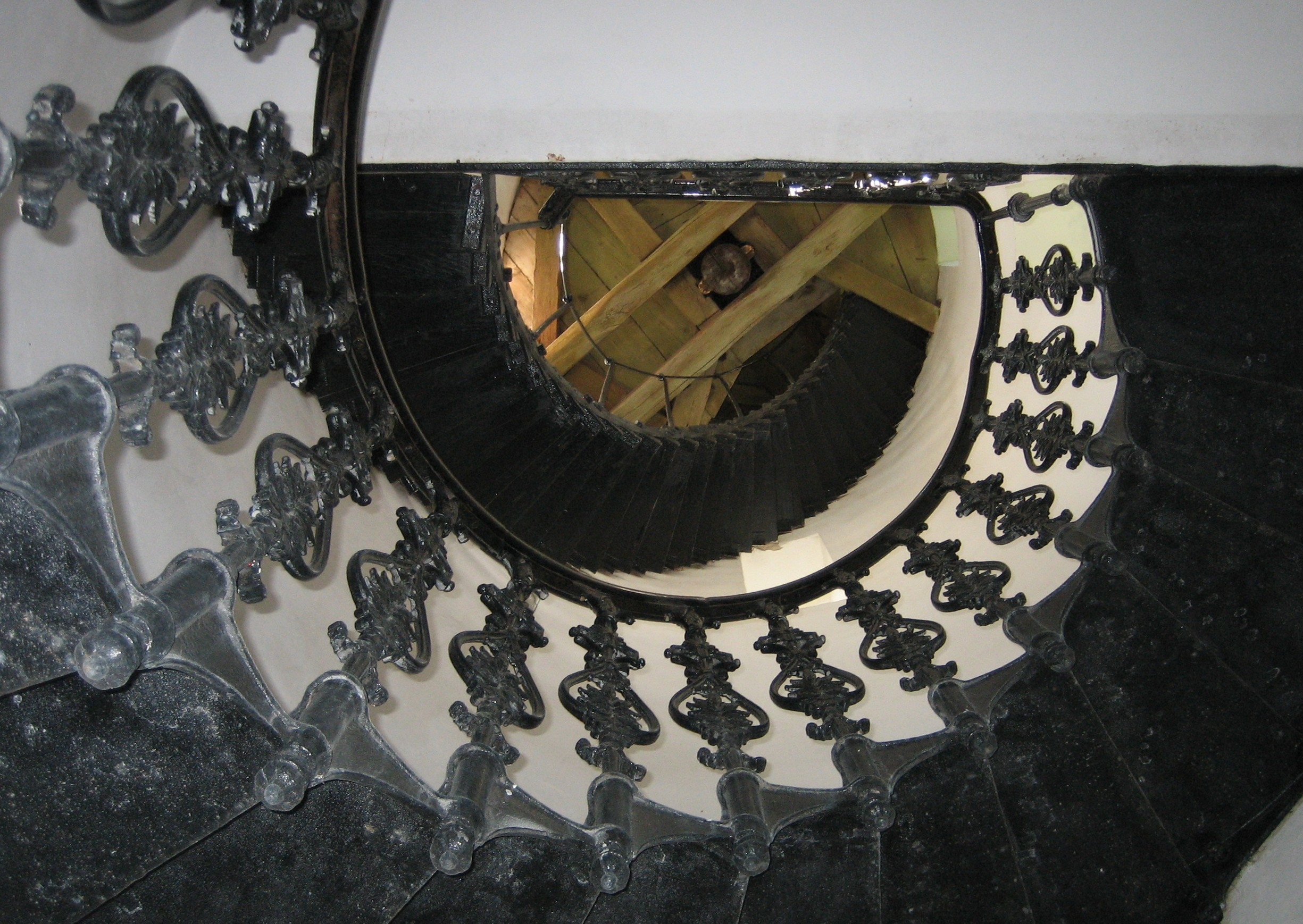
Interior staircase

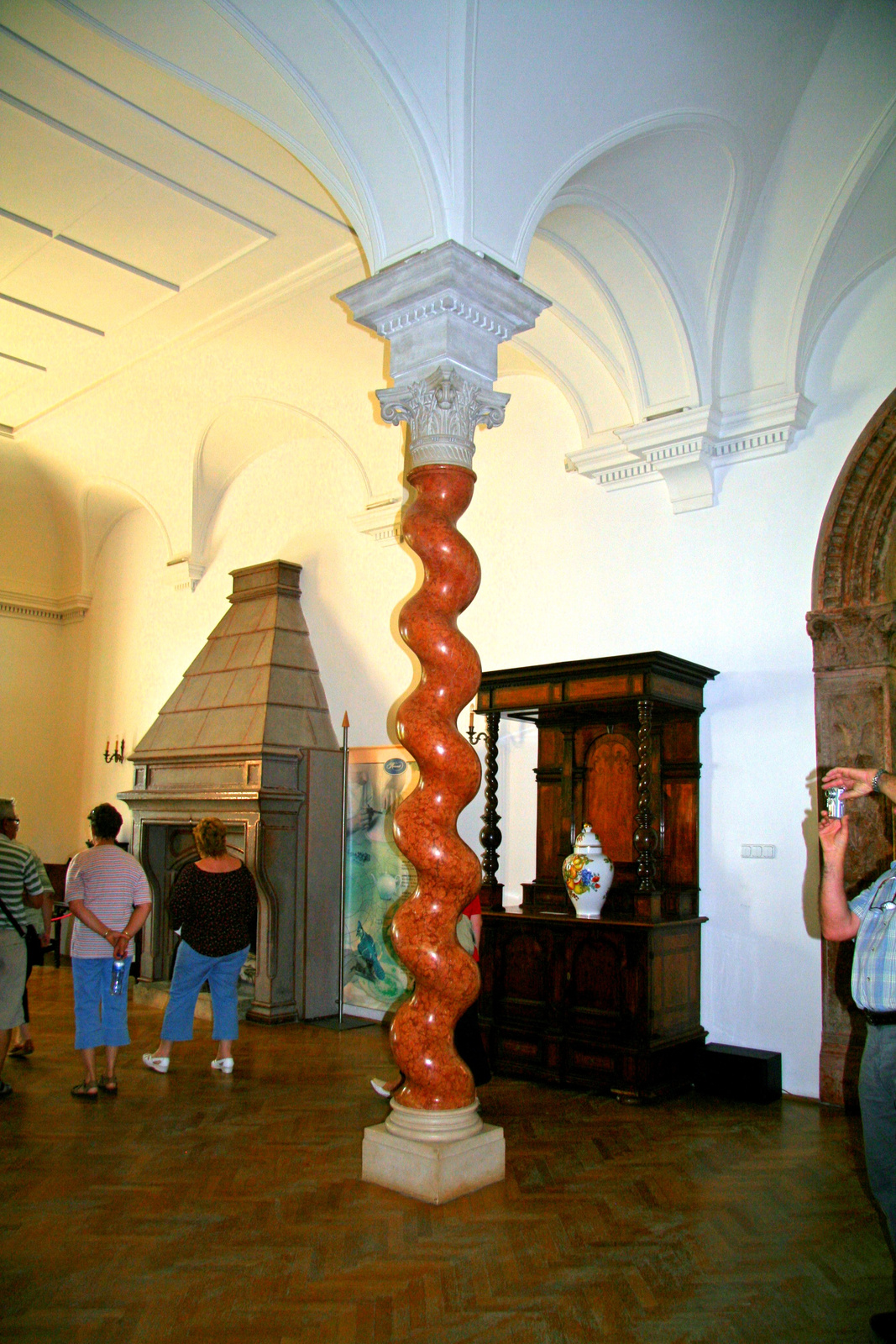
Interior column
