= Ladislaus Baksa =

Ispán of Zemplén (debated)
- Reign: 1308–1321
- Predecessor: Amadeus Aba (?)
- Successor: Mikcs Ákos
- Died: 1329 or 1330
- Noble family: gens Baksa
- Spouse: N Györkei
- Issue: Thomas Csapi; Ladislaus Sztritei; Michael Sztritei
- Father: Thomas III

Ladislaus from the kindred Baksa (Hungarian: Baksa nembeli László; died 1329 or 1330) was a Hungarian lord and soldier at the turn of the 13th and 14th centuries, who possessed landholdings in Zemplén County. Therefore, he had an important, although dubious role in the unification war of Charles I of Hungary against the oligarchic domains in Northeast Hungary. It is possible, he also served as (titular) ispán of Zemplén County from 1308 to 1321. Posthumously he was also known as Ladislaus Sztritei (Hungarian: Sztritei László) due to the family name of his descendants.

== Family ==
Ladislaus was born into the Sztritei branch of the gens (clan) Baksa, as the son of Thomas III. His father was referred to as Count of the Coursers (Hungarian: agarászispán, Latin: comes liciscariourum) in 1271. Ladislaus had a brother Doncs. Ladislaus married the unidentified daughter of Bodon Györkei, who originated from the powerful gens Aba. They had three sons: Thomas adopted the Csapi surname, while Ladislaus II and Michael became progenitors of the Sztritei noble family.

== Career and possessions ==
=== Early acquisitions ===
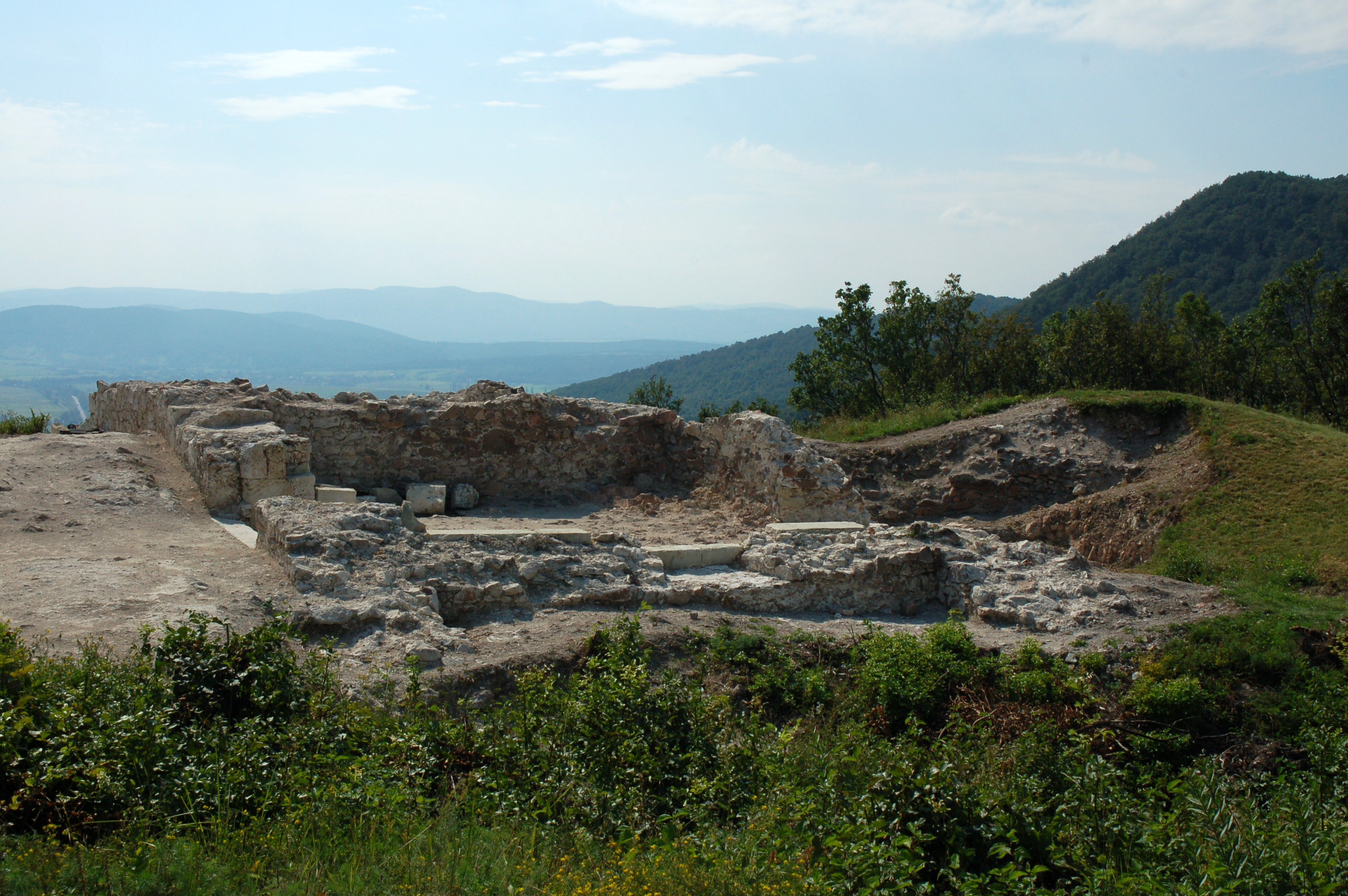
The ruins of Patak Castle (near Sátoraljaújhely), owned by Ladislaus Baksa and his kinship until 1319

Ladislaus and Doncs first appeared in contemporary records in April 1290, during the last months of the reign of Ladislaus IV of Hungary, when they were already adults. Along with several other nobles, they swore loyalty to the pretender Andrew during that time. They inherited large-scale domains in Ung and Zemplén counties from their father, including Sztrite (or Szürte), Eszeny, Rát, Ásvány, Kövesd, Csap (present-day Siurte, Esen', Rativci, Tysaashvan, Kamianske, Chop in Ukraine, respectively). It is presumable that they also owned Tiszalúc and Tarcal, as both villages were acquired by Thomas Baksa in the late 13th century. Additionally, Ladislaus acquired several lands in the early 14th century. He took possession of the pledge over Makkoshotyka for a period of three years from a certain Joseph, son of Michola around 1303. He bought the village in 1305. After the death of his uncle, the illustrious general George Baksa around 1307, Ladislaus inherited the royal forest of Patak and served as the castellan of its fort (today ruins near Sátoraljaújhely). He was also referred as ispán of Zemplén County since 1308, according to Pál Engel. In contrast, Zsoldos argued the office-holder is identical with Ladislaus, the son of Amadeus Aba, because of the Baksas' complicated relationship with the lord (see below). Nine villages belonged to the accessories of the Patak lordship, where Ladislaus also acquired portions: Borsi (present-day Borša in Slovakia), Kovácsvágás, Ladamóc (Ladmoce), Nagytoronya (Veľká Tŕňa), Sátoraljaújhely, Szőllőske, Tállya, Végardó (today a borough in Sárospatak) and Zemplén (Zemplín).

Due to their wealth and influence in the region (primarily Zemplén County), Ladislaus Baksa and other members of his clan were able to preserve their autonomy from the local oligarch Amadeus Aba, who had established a powerful dominion in Northeast Hungary independently of the Hungarian monarch during the era of so-called feudal anarchy. According to historian Gyula Kristó, while their uncle George joined Amadeus Aba's familia at the end of his life, Ladislaus and Doncs were confronted with the oligarch. In a letter, Amadeus Aba ordered Ladislaus to compensate his merchant Hannus, his officialis in Kassa (now Košice in Slovakia), for the damage he had caused. Based on this, Kristó argued Ladislaus was considered an ardent enemy of the oligarch. However, as Tibor Szőcs emphasized on another occasion, Ladislaus himself initiated a lawsuit against Hannus before the court of Amadeus in Gönc in 1299. The relationship between the Baksas and the powerful lord presumably not always the same, it seems that Ladislaus and his brother did not cultivate a close relationship with him, but not necessarily always counted as his opponent.

=== Public services ===
Ladislaus was considered a faithful confidant of Charles I of Hungary. The burghers of Kassa assassinated Amadeus Aba in September 1311. After that Charles I was committed to eradicating the Abas' oligarchic rule. However, Amadeus' sons rebelled against the king. In late 1311 or early 1312, the Aba troops sacked Sárospatak, while plundered the surrounding region. Ladislaus and Doncs Baksa led a campaign against them and successfully recovered most of the prey. However, during the skirmish, Ladislaus was captured and held in captivity at Kassa until Charles' arrival. Subsequently, the Aba troops raided and devastated the lands of the pro-Charles Peter, son of Petenye and the Baksa clan, causing a damage of 1,000 gold ducats. After his release, Charles confirmed the brothers' right of patronage over the Premonstratensian abbey of Lelesz (today Leles in Slovakia). Both Ladislaus and Doncs fought in the Battle of Rozgony in June 1312, resulting Charles' decisive victory, which brought an end to the Aba clan's rule over the eastern Kingdom of Hungary. Ladislaus was installed to as castellan of Patak since 1312 or 1313. Later, Ladislaus Baksa also participated in the royal campaign against Peter, son of Petenye, who turned against the royal power and established a de facto independent province in Zemplén County (and also claimed the title ispán) after 1312, endangering the Baksas' lands and property. When Charles' general Philip Drugeth launched a campaign against Peter in early 1317, his army marched in front of Regéc Castle, also joined by Ladislaus Baksa's auxiliary troops due to a threatening leaf by Drugeth. Regéc was besieged and seized in April 1317. In his letter, Philip emphasized that the Baksas' involvement in the operation was desirable because they could divert the "suspicion" they had of themselves. Zsoldos considered Ladislaus Baksa was previously involved in some way in the failed assassination attempt against Charles I, organized by Peter, which took place in Patak, where Ladislaus acted as castellan.

Dózsa Debreceni then Philip Drugeth became ispán of Zemplén County thereafter, while Ladislaus remained head of the Patak lordship within the county. Attila Zsoldos proposed Philip held the dignity until 1320, potentially in parallel with his local rival, Ladislaus Baksa, who was also styled as ispán of Zemplén County throughout from 1316 to 1320. Sometime between 1317 and 1320, Philip Drugeth's wife Margaret tried to persuade Ladislaus and his kinship to install a certain Thilman, her relative, as provost of Lelesz. According to her letter, Thilman arrived to the provostship, but was physically abused by the incumbent provost upon the "assistance and advice" of Ladislaus. Thilman returned to her lady and reported the alleged events, after which Margaret wrote her letter of complaint to her "relative" Ladislaus Baksa. Historian Tibor Szőcs argued Ladislaus was almost certainly further enraged that the Drugeth family, who had emerged as the most powerful family in Zemplén County, holding its ispánate, also wanted to extend their influence even to their family monastery. When Philip moved the fair at Lelesz to his own estate Salamon in Ung County (Solomonovo, Ukraine), Ladislaus and his family protested against the decision. As a result, Philip restored the old place in April 1320. Szőcs considered Philip's act regarding the relocation of the fair, was a revenge on the previous case, which caused damage to the Baksa (Sztritei) family and the Lelesz monastery at the same time.

Charles I retook the royal lordship of Patak and its accessories from Ladislaus and his family in 1319 and compensated them with a hereditary private fort, Borostyán Castle (Puruštan) near Bacskó (Bačkov, Slovakia), a former seat of the defeated Peter, son of Petenye, and its accessories in 1321, which composed 18 villages, including Tarnóka, Gálszécs, Parnó, Bacskó and Visnyó (present-day Trnávka, Sečovce, Parchovany, Bačkov and Višňov in Slovakia, respectively). Although Charles provided significant wealth to Ladislaus and his family, but it also meant political decline in public life for them, the king no longer accounted for them in a political sense. In addition, Ladislaus recovered the village of Szepestamásfalva in Szepes County (today Spišské Tomášovce in Slovakia) from the Zipser Germans in June 1320. He was granted Kisbosnya (today a borough of Parchovany in Slovakia) from Charles I in February 1321. He also owned Ágcsernyő (today Čierna, Slovakia) in May 1322. In 1323 and 1324, he also gained Guden, Maráza and Tárkány (Malé Trakany) during lawsuits in Zemplén County. In the course of the division of lands within the clan in 1329, Ladislaus' family was granted Sztrite, Eszeny, Rát, Bás, Kisbosnya, Agtelek, Kereplye (Kravany) and Parnó, a portion of Gálszécs, while some forests and farmlands left in joint management. Ladislaus died sometime after June (or possibly November) 1329, his widow is mentioned in January 1330.

== Sources ==
- Csige, Mónika (2001). "Baksa nembeli László birtokai [The Possessions of Ladislaus from the Kindred Baksa]". In Weisz, Boglárka; Balogh, László; Szarka, József (eds.). Tanulmányok a középkorról (in Hungarian). University of Szeged. pp. 29–38. ISBN 963-482-536-2.
- Engel, Pál (1988). "Az ország újraegyesítése. I. Károly küzdelmei az oligarchák ellen (1310–1323) [Reunification of the Realm. The Struggles of Charles I Against the Oligarchs (1310–1323)]". Századok (in Hungarian). 122 (1–2). Magyar Történelmi Társulat: 89–146. ISSN 0039-8098.
- Engel, Pál (1996). Magyarország világi archontológiája, 1301–1457, I [Secular Archontology of Hungary, 1301–1457, Volume I] (in Hungarian). História, MTA Történettudományi Intézete. ISBN 963-8312-44-0.
- Szőcs, Tibor (2020). "Egy prépostállítás buktatói. A Drugetek és a Sztriteiek konfliktusa a leleszi konvent körül [The Pitfalls of Appointing a Provost. The Conflict of the Druget and Sztritei Families Concerning the Convent of Leles]". Aetas (in Hungarian). 35 (2). AETAS Könyv- és Lapkiadó Egyesület: 142–154. ISSN 0237-7934.
- Zsoldos, Attila (2011). Magyarország világi archontológiája, 1000–1301 [Secular Archontology of Hungary, 1000–1301] (in Hungarian). História, MTA Történettudományi Intézete. ISBN 978-963-9627-38-3.
- Zsoldos, Attila (2017). A Druget-tartomány története 1315–1342 [The History of the Druget Province 1315–1342] (in Hungarian). MTA Bölcsészettudományi Kutatóközpont Történettudományi Intézete. ISBN 978-963-4160-63-2.

Ladislaus I Genus Baksa Born: ? Died: 1329 or 1330
Political offices
Preceded by Amadeus Aba (?)	Ispán of Zemplén; 1308–1321	Succeeded by Mikcs Ákos
