= Ďurkov =

Village and municipality in Slovakia

Ďurkov Györke
- Municipality
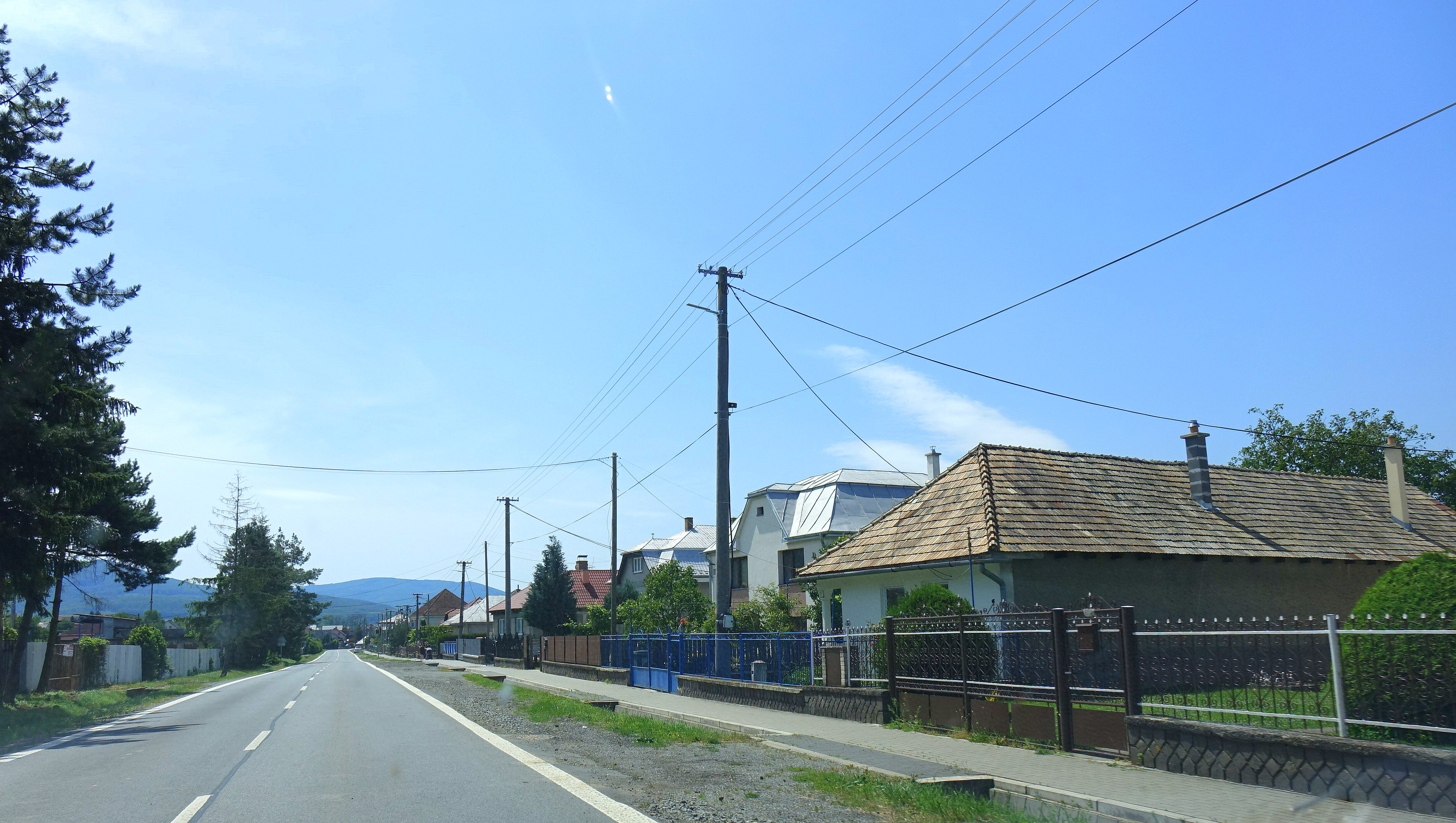

- Flag

- Location of Ďurkov in the Košice Region Location of Ďurkov in Slovakia
- Coordinates: 48.72°N 21.25°E
- Country: Slovakia
- Region: Košice Region
- District: Košice-okolie District
- First mentioned: 1323

Government
  - Mayor: Radoslav Sasák (Ind.)

Area
  - Total: 9.92 km^{2} (3.83 sq mi)
- Elevation: 264 m (866 ft)

Population (2025)
  - Total: 2,090
- Time zone: UTC+1 (CET)
  - Summer (DST): UTC+2 (CEST)
- Postal code: 441 9
- Area code: +421 55
- Vehicle registration plate (until 2022): KS
- Website: www.durkov.sk

Ďurkov (Hungarian: Györke) is a village and municipality in Košice-okolie District in the Košice Region of eastern Slovakia.

== History ==
In historical records the village was first mentioned in 1272.

== Geography ==
The municipality lies at an altitude of 264 metres (866 ft) and covers an area of 9.92 km^{2} (3.83 sq mi) (2025).

== Population ==
Population statistic (10 years)
Year	1995	2005	2015	2025
Count	1347	1548	1790	2090
Difference		+14.92%	+15.63%	+16.75%

Population statistic
Year	2024	2025
Count	2066	2090
Difference		+1.16%

It has a population of 2090 people (31 December 2025).

=== Ethnicity ===
Census 2021 (1+ %)
Ethnicity	Number	Fraction
Slovak	1779	92.36%
Romani	94	4.88%
Not found out	89	4.62%
Total	1926	

In year 2021 was 1926 people by ethnicity 1779 as Slovak, 94 as Romani, 89 as Not found out, 17 as Hungarian, 11 as Czech, 6 as Rusyn, 4 as Russian, 1 as German and 1 as Moravian.

Note on population: The difference values of population numbers in the table "Population statistic" and in the sections "Ethnicity" & "Religion" is caused by the use of various statistical methods.

=== Religion ===
Census 2021 (1+ %)
Religion	Number	Fraction
Roman Catholic Church	920	47.77%
Calvinist Church	409	21.24%
None	349	18.12%
Not found out	82	4.26%
Evangelical Church	73	3.79%
Greek Catholic Church	60	3.12%
Jehovah's Witnesses	24	1.25%
Total	1926	

In year 2021 was 1926 people by religion 920 from Roman Catholic Church, 409 from Calvinist Church, 349 from None, 82 from Not found out, 73 from Evangelical Church, 60 from Greek Catholic Church, 24 from Jehovah's Witnesses, 3 from Christian Congregations in Slovakia, 3 from Other, 2 from Eastern Orthodox Church and 1 from Apostolic Church.

== Government ==
The village relies on the Bohdanovce police force and the fire brigade at Bidovce. The district and tax offices are located at Košice.

== Culture ==
The village has a small public library.

== Transport ==
The nearest railway station is located at Ruskov, 5 kilometres away and there is bus from Košice arriving during all day and also there is small airport in Bidovce 4 km away.

== Genealogical resources ==
The records for genealogical research are available at the state archive "Statny Archiv in Kosice, Slovakia"

- Roman Catholic church records (births/marriages/deaths): 1789-1918 (parish B)
- Greek Catholic church records (births/marriages/deaths): 1788-1912 (parish B)
- Lutheran church records (births/marriages/deaths): 1776-1898 (parish B)
- Reformated church records (births/marriages/deaths): 1801-1952 (parish A)

== See also ==
- List of municipalities and towns in Slovakia
