= Baksa (name) =

Baksa is a surname of Hungarian, Croatian and Slovak origin which has several meanings. It may be a derivative of the old personal name Bak, or a toponymic surname from one of several places named Baksa. A form of this surname, spelled Baxa, is found in the Czech Republic.

It is also the name of a medieval Hungarian clan.

Notable people with the surname include:

- George Baksa (c. 1250–after 1307), Hungarian lord and military leader
- Ladislaus Baksa (died 1329/30), Hungarian lord and soldier
- Thomas Baksa (died after 1288), Hungarian lord
- Zoltán Baksa (born 1983), Hungarian footballer
