= Sarolta Geőcze =

Hungarian Christian socialist women's rights activist and educator

- Born: 27 December 1862; Bacskó, Kingdom of Hungary
- Died: 23 September 1928 (aged 65); Budapest, Hungary
- Occupations: Women's rights activist, educator and writer

Sarolta Geőcze de Szendrő (Hungarian: szendrői Geőcze Sarolta; 27 December 1862 – 23 September 1928) was a Hungarian Christian socialist women's rights activist and educator.

== Life ==
Geőcze was born on 27 December 1862 in the village of Bacskó in the Kingdom of Hungary, now part of Slovakia. She graduated from the State Institute for the Instruction of Women Primary School Teachers (Hungarian: Állami Elemi Tanítónőképző (Buda Institute)) in 1882 and then later the State Institute for the Instruction of Women Secondary School Teachers (Hungarian: Állami Polgári Iskolai Tanítónőképzőintézet (Pest Institute)). She was recommended for a position at a girls' intermediate school in Brassó County (now in Romania) in 1886 and was director of the school two years later. Geőcze was transferred to another girls' intermediate school in Komárom County in 1892 and remained there for five years. After a year abroad to study teaching methods in religious schools, she began teaching at the Pest Institute in 1898. She was controversially appointed director of the Buda Institute in 1907 as some thought her under-qualified. However she remained for the next decade. Geőcze was fired in 1917 and started teaching again at the Pest Institute shortly afterwards until her retirement in 1926. She died in Budapest two years later.

== Activities ==
Geőcze was one of the founders of the Mária Dorothea Association (Hungarian: Mária Dorothea Egyesület), an organization dedicated to improving women's higher education, in 1885. Beginning in 1888, she published numerous articles on girls' education, foreign teaching methods and the "need for Hungarian pedagogical methods able to strengthen national identity and morality". "Throughout the 1890s, Geőcze began to lay greater emphasis on the role of women's education as a means of advancing Hungary as a Christian nation. By the turn of the century, she was seeking to protect women she thought morally and economically vulnerable—migrants, domestic servants, factory workers—through education and material assistance." During the Second National University Education Congress in Budapest in 1896, she lectured on women's education and employment.
