= Baksho Rahashya =

Baksho Rahashya (lit. 'mystery box') may refer to:

- Baksho Rahashya (novel), a 1972 novel by Satyajit Ray
- Baksho Rahashya (film), a 1996 Indian telefilm and 2001 film directed by Sandip Ray, based on the novel

== See also ==
- Baksa (disambiguation)
- Rahasyam (disambiguation)
