= Baxa =

Baxa is a Czech surname, sometimes a variant of Baksa. Notable people with the surname include:

- Bohumil Baxa, Czech lawyer
- Josef Baxa, Czech lawyer
- Karel Baxa (1863–1938), Czech politician
- María Baxa (1946–2019), Italian-Serbian actress
- Martin Baxa (born 1975), Czech politician
- Robert Baxa, Czech lawyer
- Thomas Baxa (1946–2019), American artist
