= Thomas Baksa =

13th c. Hungarian lord

Thomas (III) Baksa

Count of the Coursers
- Reign: 1271
- Died: after 1288
- Noble family: gens Baksa
- Issue: Ladislaus I Doncs
- Father: Simon I

Thomas (III) from the kindred Baksa (Hungarian: Baksa nembeli (III.) Tamás; died after 1288) was a Hungarian lord in the second half of the 13th century. He was a supporter of Stephen V of Hungary.

== Family ==
Thomas was born into the gens (clan) Baksa, as the son of Simon I, the ispán of the royal forest of Patak in 1262. He had five brothers, including the illustrious military leader George, and a sister. Thomas had two sons from his unidentified wife, Ladislaus, who inherited his wealth and was ancestor of the Sztritei family, and Doncs.

== Career ==
The Baksa clan, which had originated from the valley between the rivers Bodrog and Tisza, possessed villages and landholdings in Northeast Hungary, mainly Zemplén County. According to contemporary sources, Thomas owned Tiszalúc and Tarcal. The Baksa clan (Simon and his sons) supported Duke Stephen in the conflict with his father, King Béla IV of Hungary, as their lands laid in the territory of the rex junior after the division of the kingdom in the early 1260s. When the civil war between Béla and Stephen broke out in 1264, the royal army forced Stephen to retreat to Feketehalom (now Codlea, Romania). Thomas and his brothers followed their lord and have found shelter in the fort. They were among those partisans, who relieved the castle, when Béla's army unsuccessfully besieged it. Following Stephen's ascension to the Hungarian throne, Thomas was styled as Count of the Coursers (Hungarian: agarászispán, Latin: comes liciscariourum) in 1271, which was considered a minor court position and he is the only known office-holder. For his loyal service, he was granted the estate of Kengyeltelek, near Bodrogszerdahely (present-day Streda nad Bodrogom in Slovakia) in that year.

After the death of Stephen V, he remained a supporter of the royal power during the rule of the child Ladislaus IV of Hungary, who donated the village of Radvány to Thomas in 1280. In the subsequent years, Thomas and his younger brothers acquired several lands along the upper course of the river Tisza. He bought Semjén and Kövesd in the territory of Bodrogköz and Halász in Szabolcs County in 1280, Sztrite (present-day Siurte, Ukraine) in 1281. The Baksa brothers, including Thomas, fought in the Battle of Lake Hód, near Hódmezővásárhely, against the Cumans in 1282. He bought a portion of Karcsa from the Hospitaller Order of Saint John in that year. Thomas and his brother, Baksa bought Eszeny (Esen') from the gens (clan) Becsegergely in 1283. Thomas was granted the right of patronage over the provostry of Lelesz (present-day Leles, Slovakia) by King Ladislaus IV in 1283. The king also handed over the estate of Rát (today Rativci, Ukraine) to Thomas and his brothers upon their request in that year. Thomas was granted Ásvány (today Tysaashvan in Ukraine) as a compensation by Andrew Bacskai (from the clan Gutkeled) in 1286. It is plausible that Thomas and some of his brothers (excluding George) joined the rebellion against Ladislaus IV. After the battle along the river Zsitva (Žitava) in March 1287, Ladislaus confiscated their lands, including Thomas' right of patronage over Lelesz. After the promulgation of the mass amnesty around November, Thomas and his brothers regained their lands and the patronage over Lelesz in February 1288 (for that time, Thomas shared it with his family), through the possible mediation of their royalist brother, George Baksa. Thomas died sometime after 1288.

== Sources ==
- Csige, Mónika (2001). "Baksa nembeli László birtokai [The Possessions of Ladislaus from the Kindred Baksa]". In Weisz, Boglárka; Balogh, László; Szarka, József (eds.). Tanulmányok a középkorról (in Hungarian). University of Szeged. pp. 29–38. ISBN 963-482-536-2.
- Kovács, Viktória (2017). "Lelesz patrónusai [The Patrons of Lelesz]". Történelmi Szemle (in Hungarian). 59 (1). Hungarian Academy of Sciences: 103–127. ISSN 0040-9634.
- Zsoldos, Attila (2007). Családi ügy: IV. Béla és István ifjabb király viszálya az 1260-as években [A family affair: The Conflict between Béla IV and Junior King Stephen in the 1260s] (in Hungarian). História, MTA Történettudományi Intézete. ISBN 978-963-9627-15-4.
- Zsoldos, Attila (2011). Magyarország világi archontológiája, 1000–1301 [Secular Archontology of Hungary, 1000–1301] (in Hungarian). História, MTA Történettudományi Intézete. ISBN 978-963-9627-38-3.
