= Sátoraljaújhely District =

Coordinates: 48.4500°N 21.5167°E

Sátoraljaújhely District Sátoraljaújhelyi járás
- Districts of Hungary
- Coat of arms

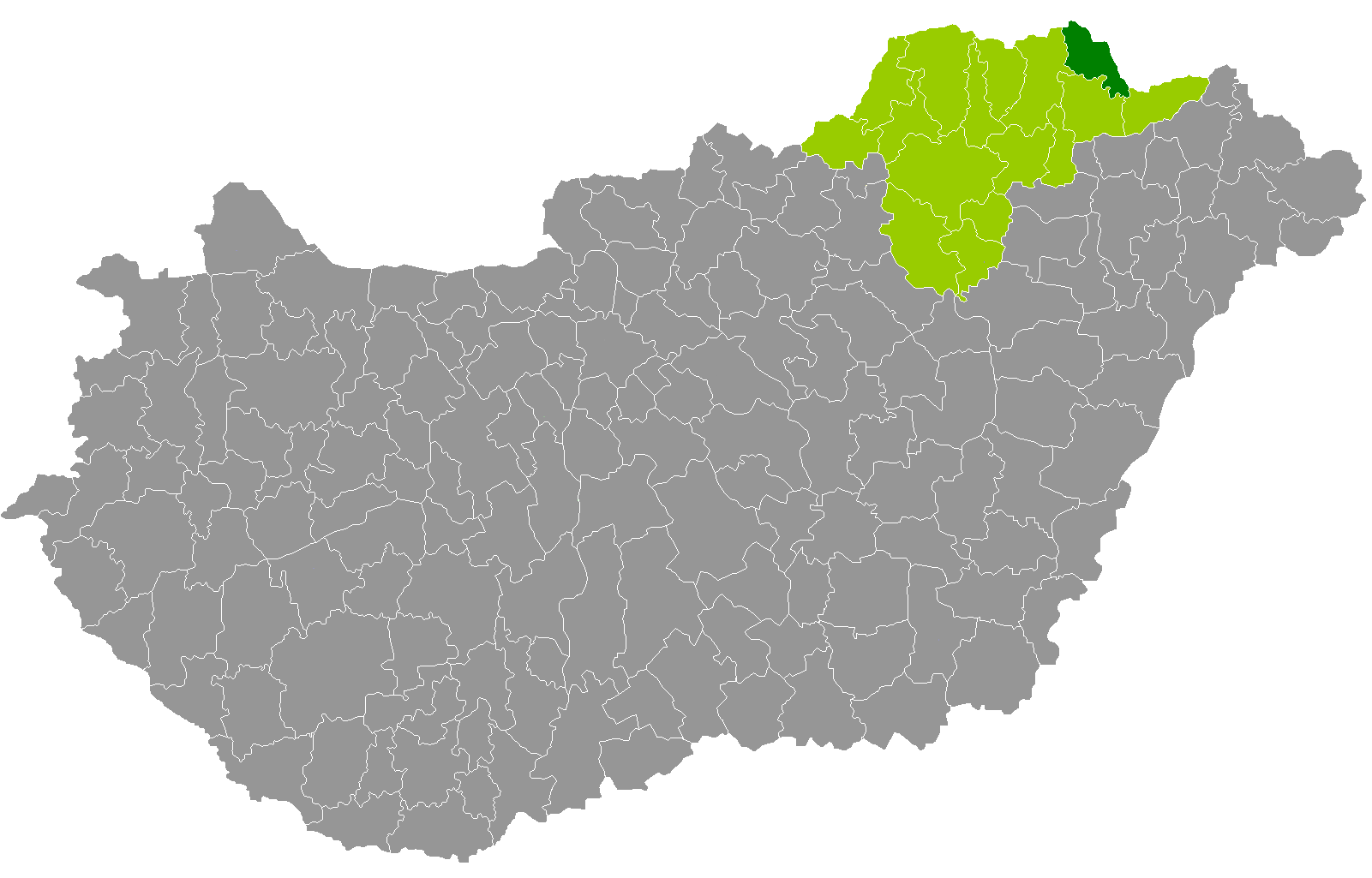
- Sátoraljaújhely District within Hungary and Borsod-Abaúj-Zemplén County.
- Country: Hungary
- County: Borsod-Abaúj-Zemplén
- District seat: Sátoraljaújhely

Area
  - Total: 321.38 km^{2} (124.09 sq mi)
  - Rank: 13th in Borsod-Abaúj-Zemplén

Population (2011 census)
  - Total: 23,058
  - Rank: 9th in Borsod-Abaúj-Zemplén
  - Density: 72/km^{2} (190/sq mi)

Sátoraljaújhely (Hungarian: Sátoraljaújhelyi járás, Slovak: Šiatronovomestský okres) is a district in north-eastern part of Borsod-Abaúj-Zemplén County. Sátoraljaújhely is also the name of the town where the district seat is found. The district is located in the Northern Hungary Statistical Region.

== Geography ==
Sátoraljaújhely District borders with the Slovak Košice Region to the northeast, Cigánd District and Sárospatak District to the south, Gönc District to the west. The number of the inhabited places in Sátoraljaújhely District is 21.

== Municipalities ==
The district has two towns and 19 villages. (ordered by population, as of 1 January 2012)

- Alsóberecki (722)
- Alsóregmec (196)
- Bózsva (183)
- Felsőberecki (273)
- Felsőregmec (322)
- Filkeháza (97)
- Füzér (467)
- Füzérkajata (110)
- Füzérkomlós (331)
- Füzérradvány (318)
- Hollóháza (826)
- Kishuta (272)
- Kovácsvágás (649)
- Mikóháza (576)
- Nagyhuta (89)
- Nyíri (412)
- **Pálháza** (1,000)
- Pusztafalu (192)
- **Sátoraljaújhely** (15,355) – district seat
- Vágáshuta (83)
- Vilyvitány (230)

The bolded municipalities are cities.

== Demographics ==
Religion in Sátoraljaújhely District (2011 census)
1. Catholic Church (36.3%)
2. Greek Catholicism (12.0%)
3. Calvinism (21.2%)
4. Lutheranism (0.20%)
5. Other religions (1.60%)
6. Non-religious (8.70%)
7. Atheists (0.40%)
8. Undeclared (19.6%)

In 2011, it had a population of 23,058 and the population density was 72/km².

Year	County population	Change
2011	23,058	n/a

=== Ethnicity ===
Besides the Hungarian majority, the main minorities are the Roma (approx. 3,000), Slovak (800), German (200) and Rusyn (150).

Total population (2011 census): 23,058
Ethnic groups (2011 census): Identified themselves: 24,811 persons:

- Hungarians: 20,723 (83.52%)
- Gypsies: 2,780 (11.20%)
- Slovaks: 784 (3.16%)
- Others and indefinable: 524 (2.11%)

Approx. 2,000 persons in Sátoraljaújhely District did declare more than one ethnic group at the 2011 census.

=== Religion ===
Religious adherence in the county according to 2011 census:

- Catholic – 11,135 (Roman Catholic – 8,372; Greek Catholic – 2,762);
- Reformed – 4,885;
- Evangelical – 45;
- other religions – 372;
- Non-religious – 2,001;
- Atheism – 106;
- Undeclared – 4,514.

== Gallery ==
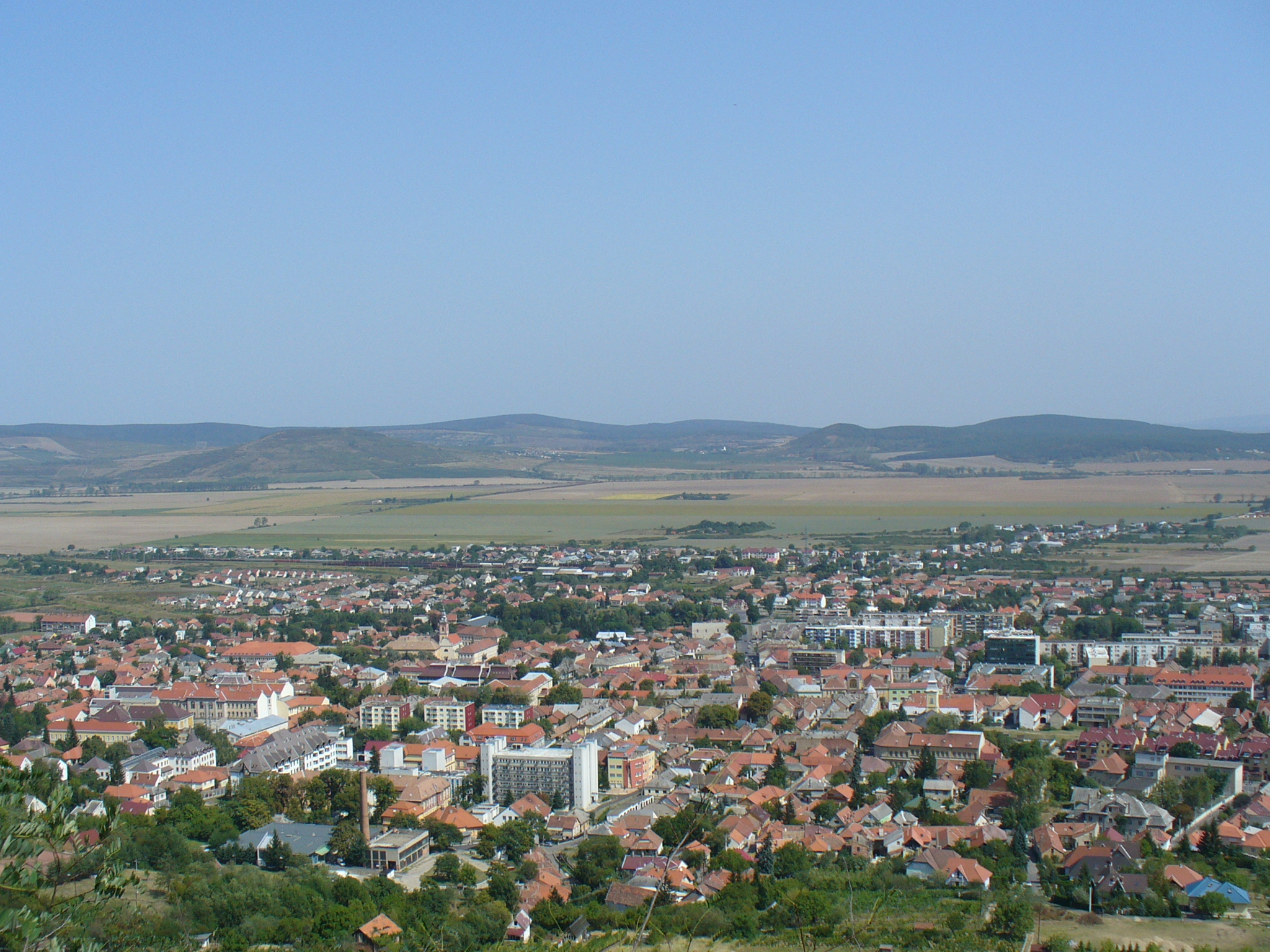
Sátoraljaújhely, the district seat

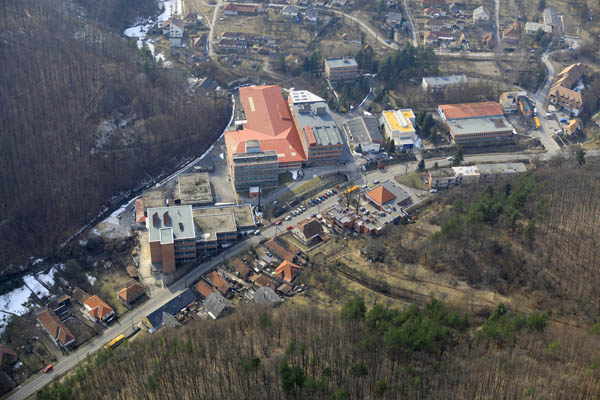
Aerial view of Hollóháza

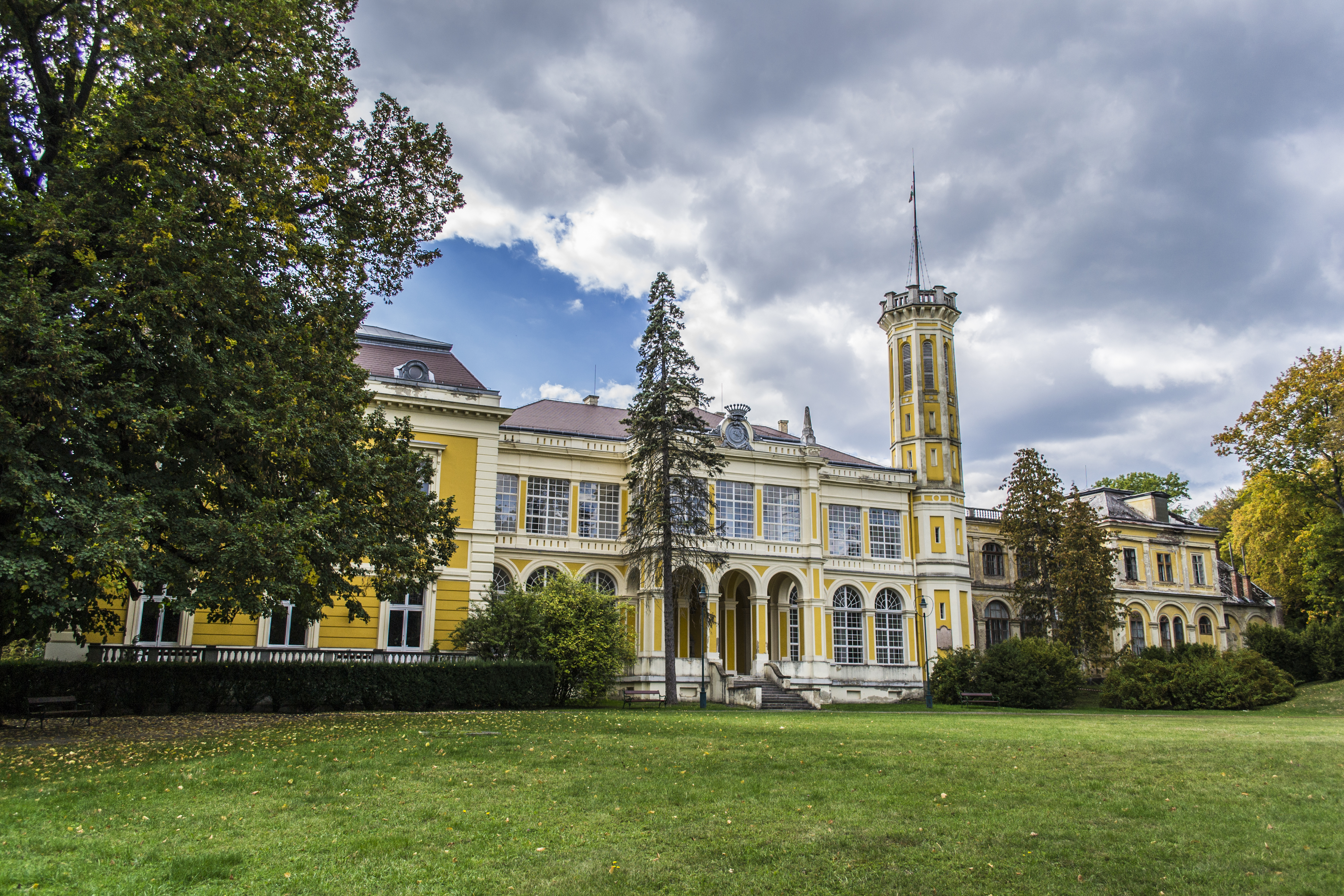
Károlyi Mansion in Füzérradvány

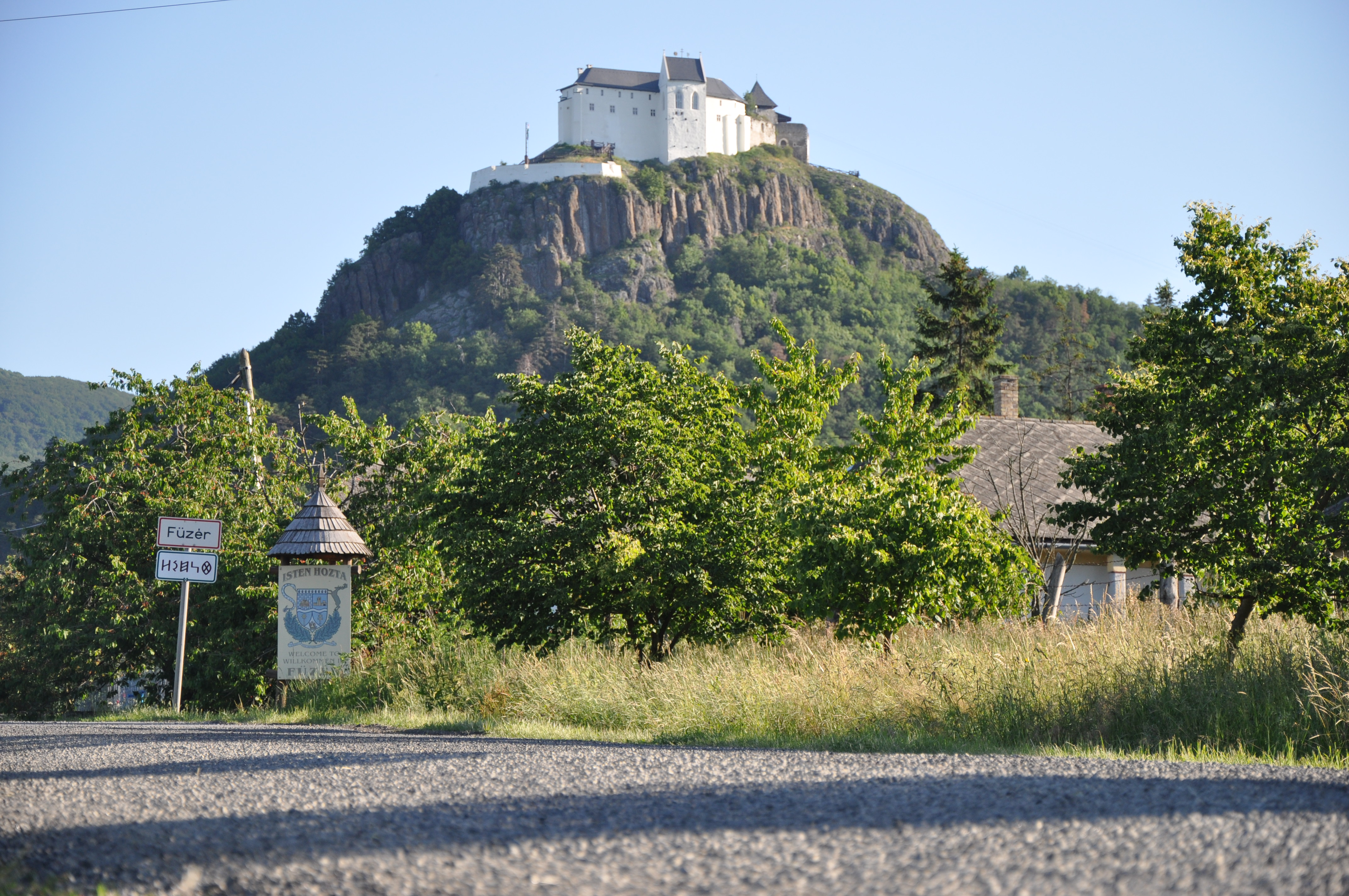
Füzér Castle

== See also ==
- List of cities and towns of Hungary
