= Kovácsvágás =

- Village
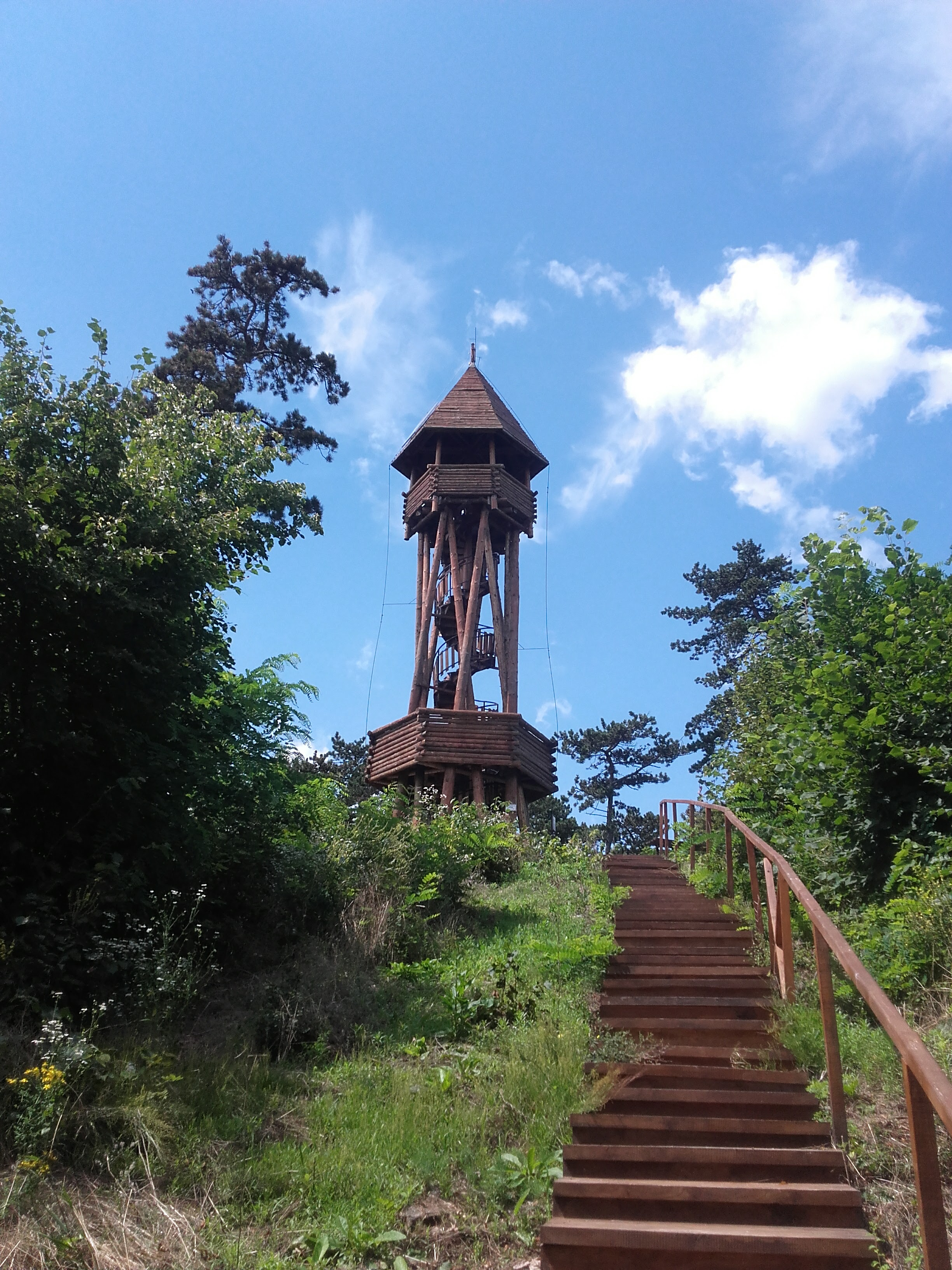

- Flag Coat of arms

- Location of Kovácsvágás
- Coordinates: 48.45446°N 21.52835°E
- Country: Hungary
- Region: Northern Hungary
- County: Borsod-Abaúj-Zemplén
- District: Sátoraljaújhely

Area
  - Total: 21.13 km^{2} (8.16 sq mi)

Population (1 January 2026)
  - Total: 585
  - Density: 27.7/km^{2} (71.7/sq mi)
- Time zone: UTC+1 (CET)
  - Summer (DST): UTC+2 (CEST)
- Postal code: 3992
- Area code: (+36) 47
- Website: kovacsvagas.hu

Kovácsvágás is a village in Borsod-Abaúj-Zemplén County in northeastern Hungary.
