= Baksa, Hungary =

Baksa
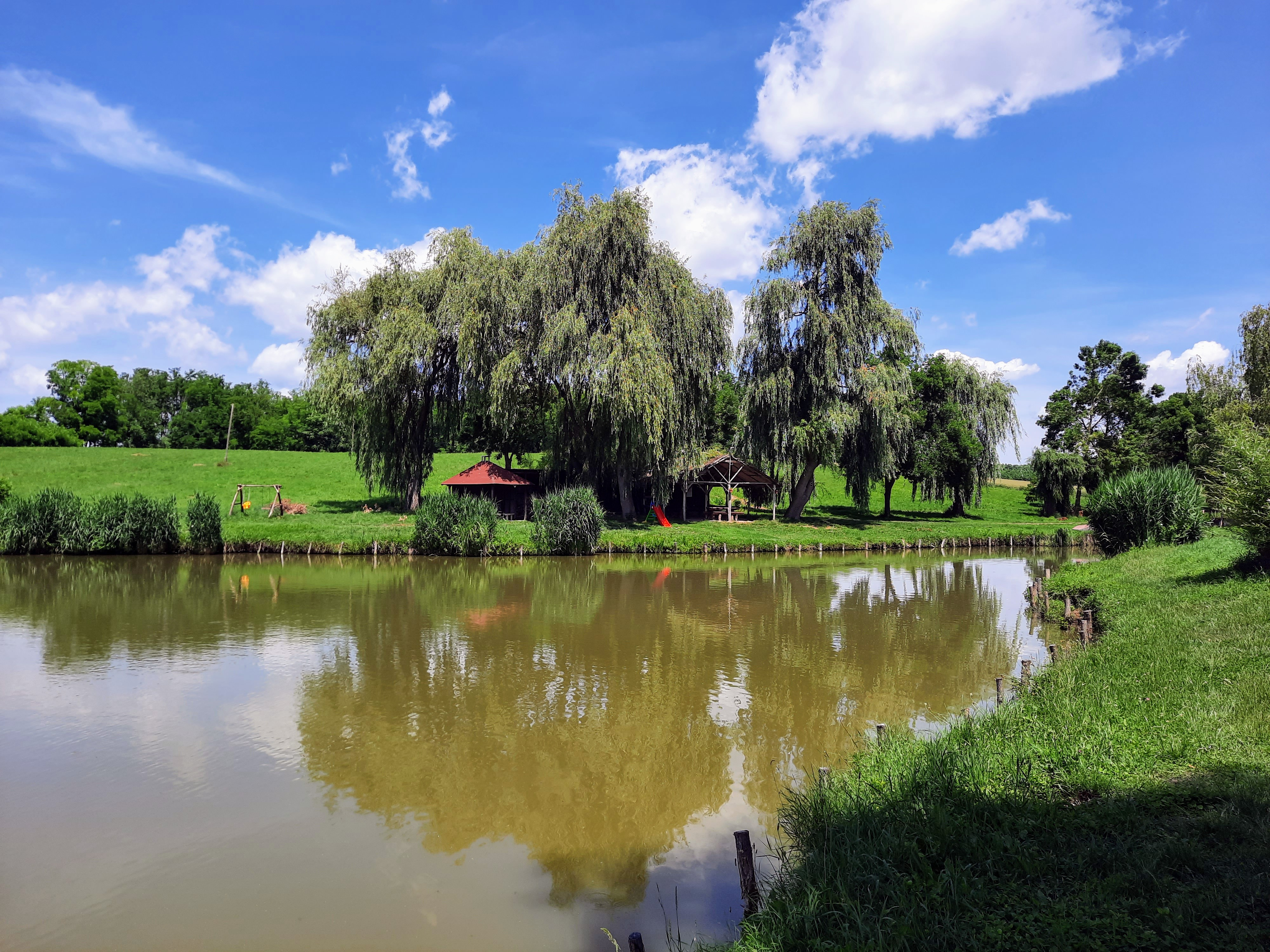

- Flag Coat of arms

- Location of Baranya county in Hungary

- Location of Baksa
- Coordinates: 45.95517°N 18.09220°E
- Country: Hungary
- County: Baranya

Area
  - Total: 13.82 km^{2} (5.34 sq mi)

Population (2015)
  - Total: 745
  - Density: 53.9/km^{2} (140/sq mi)
- Time zone: UTC+1 (CET)
  - Summer (DST): UTC+2 (CEST)
- Postal code: 7834
- Area code: 72

Baksa (Croatian: Bokšica) is a village in Baranya county, Hungary.
