= Orešany =

Orešany Tótdiós
- Municipality
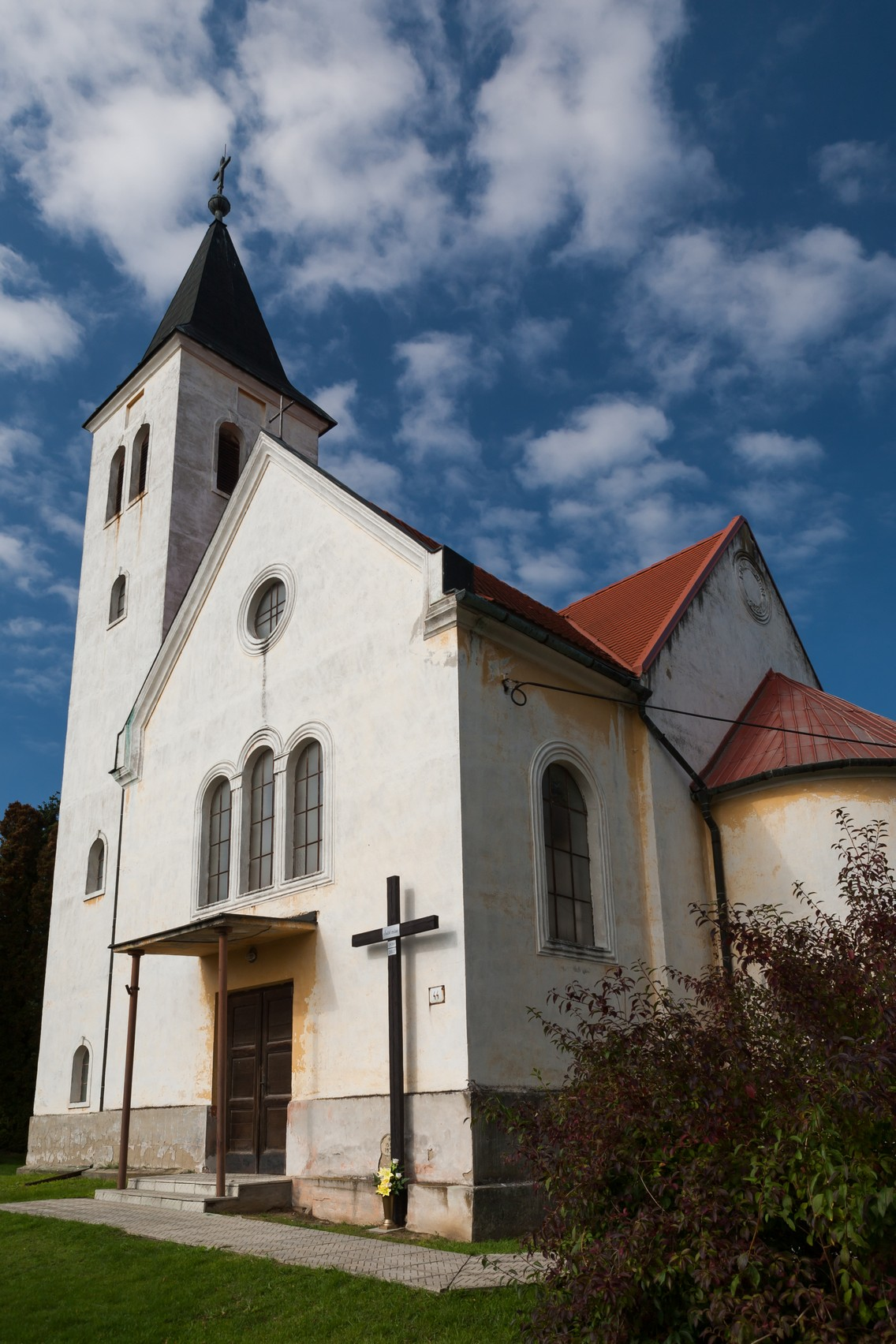
- Church of the Exaltation of the Holy Cross

- Flag

- Location of Orešany in the Nitra Region Location of Orešany in Slovakia
- Coordinates: 48.51°N 17.90°E
- Country: Slovakia
- Region: Nitra Region
- District: Topoľčany District
- First mentioned: 1330

Area
  - Total: 6.71 km^{2} (2.59 sq mi)
- Elevation: 238 m (781 ft)

Population (2025)
  - Total: 316
- Time zone: UTC+1 (CET)
  - Summer (DST): UTC+2 (CEST)
- Postal code: 956 06
- Area code: +421 38
- Vehicle registration plate (until 2022): TO
- Website: www.obecoresany.sk

Orešany (Hungarian: Tótdiós) is a municipality in the Topoľčany District of the Nitra Region, Slovakia. In 2011 it had 325 inhabitants.

== Geography ==
The municipality lies at an altitude of 238 metres (781 ft) and covers an area of 6.71 km^{2} (2.59 sq mi) (2025).

== Population ==
Population statistic (10 years)
Year	1995	2005	2015	2025
Count	315	267	329	316
Difference		−15.23%	+23.22%	−3.95%

Population statistic
Year	2024	2025
Count	330	316
Difference		−4.24%

It has a population of 316 people (31 December 2025).

=== Ethnicity ===
Census 2021 (1+ %)
Ethnicity	Number	Fraction
Slovak	324	96.71%
Not found out	12	3.58%
Total	335	

In year 2021 was 335 people by ethnicity 324 as Slovak, 12 as Not found out, 2 as Czech, 2 as Hungarian, 1 as Rusyn and 1 as Moravian.

Note on population: The difference values of population numbers in the table "Population statistic" and in the sections "Ethnicity" & "Religion" is caused by the use of various statistical methods.

=== Religion ===
Census 2021 (1+ %)
Religion	Number	Fraction
Roman Catholic Church	226	67.46%
None	88	26.27%
Not found out	10	2.99%
Evangelical Church	5	1.49%
Total	335	

In year 2021 was 335 people by religion 226 from Roman Catholic Church, 88 from None, 10 from Not found out, 5 from Evangelical Church, 3 from Christian Congregations in Slovakia, 1 from Calvinist Church, 1 from Greek Catholic Church and 1 from Seventh-day Adventist Church.
