= Parchovany =

Village and municipality in Slovakia

Parchovany Parnó
- Municipality
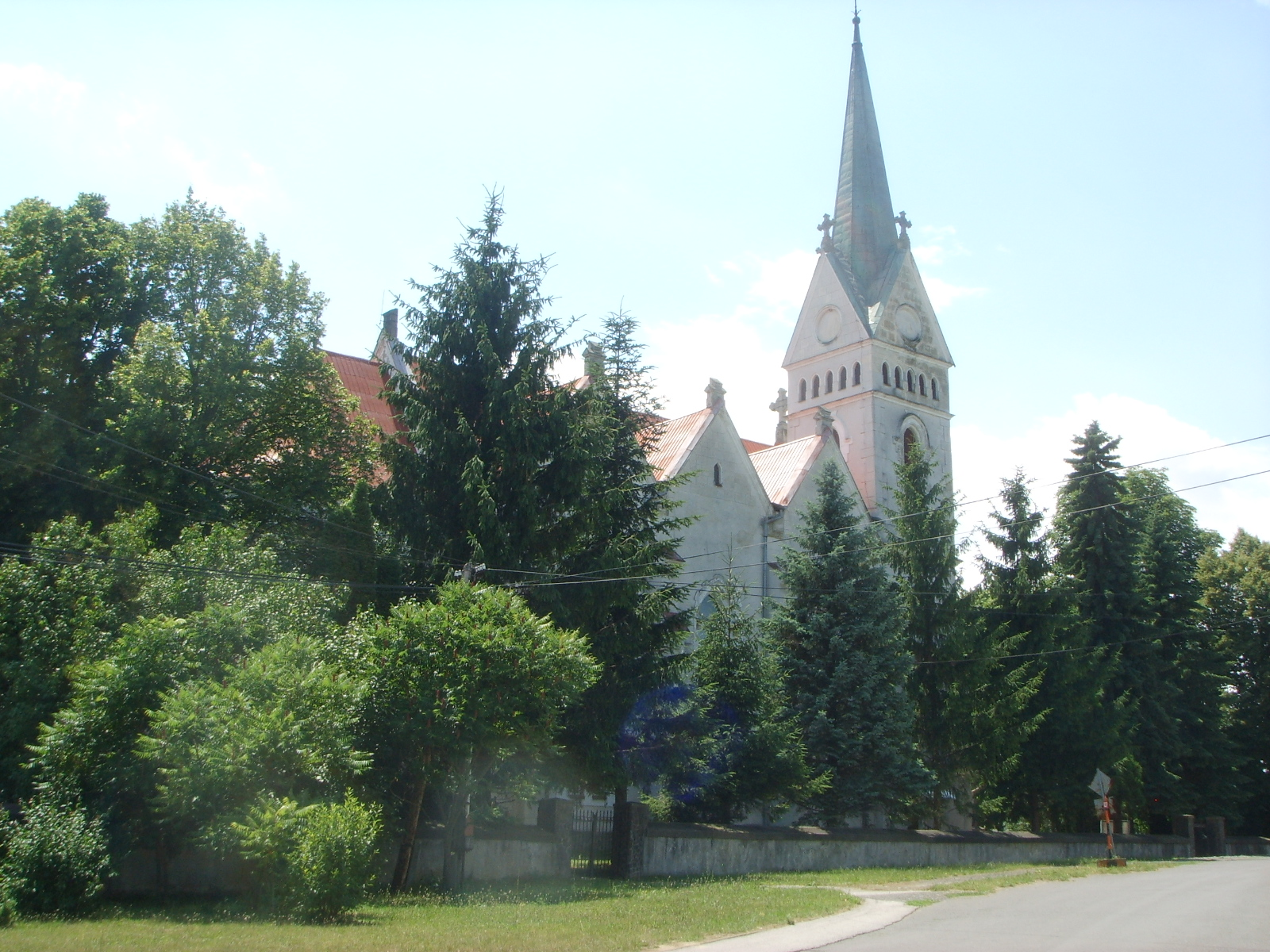
- Church of Saint Stephen

- Flag

- Location of Parchovany in the Košice Region Location of Parchovany in Slovakia
- Coordinates: 48.75°N 21.72°E
- Country: Slovakia
- Region: Košice Region
- District: Trebišov District
- First mentioned: 1320

Area
  - Total: 23.23 km^{2} (8.97 sq mi)
- Elevation: 111 m (364 ft)

Population (2025)
  - Total: 2,002
- Time zone: UTC+1 (CET)
  - Summer (DST): UTC+2 (CEST)
- Postal code: 766 2
- Area code: +421 56
- Vehicle registration plate (until 2022): TV
- Website: www.parchovany.sk

Parchovany (Hungarian: Parnó) is a village and municipality in the Trebišov District in the Košice Region of south-eastern Slovakia.

== History ==
In historical records the village was first mentioned in 1320. The village was part of Hungary until 1920, then of Czechoslovakia, and today, is in Slovakia.

== Geography ==
The municipality lies at an altitude of 111 metres (364 ft) and covers an area of 23.23 km^{2} (8.97 sq mi) (2025).

== Population ==
Population statistic (10 years)
Year	1995	2005	2015	2025
Count	1756	1927	1934	2002
Difference		+9.73%	+0.36%	+3.51%

Population statistic
Year	2024	2025
Count	2001	2002
Difference		+0.04%

It has a population of 2002 people (31 December 2025).

=== Ethnicity ===
Census 2021 (1+ %)
Ethnicity	Number	Fraction
Slovak	1563	79.5%
Romani	297	15.1%
Not found out	118	6%
Total	1966	

In year 2021 was 1966 people by ethnicity 1563 as Slovak, 297 as Romani, 118 as Not found out, 12 as Rusyn, 7 as Czech, 1 as Serbian, 1 as Russian, 1 as Polish, 1 as German, 1 as Hungarian and 1 as Other.

Note on population: The difference values of population numbers in the table "Population statistic" and in the sections "Ethnicity" & "Religion" is caused by the use of various statistical methods.

=== Religion ===
Census 2021 (1+ %)
Religion	Number	Fraction
Roman Catholic Church	1197	60.89%
None	417	21.21%
Not found out	168	8.55%
Greek Catholic Church	158	8.04%
Total	1966	

In year 2021 was 1966 people by religion 1197 from Roman Catholic Church, 417 from None, 168 from Not found out, 158 from Greek Catholic Church, 12 from Calvinist Church, 5 from Jehovah's Witnesses, 4 from Evangelical Church, 2 from Eastern Orthodox Church, 2 from Ad hoc movements and 1 from Christian Congregations in Slovakia.

== Facilities ==
The village has a public library, a gym and a football pitch. The village has its own birth registry office.
