= Ruskov =

Village and municipality in Slovakia

Ruskov Ruszka
- Municipality
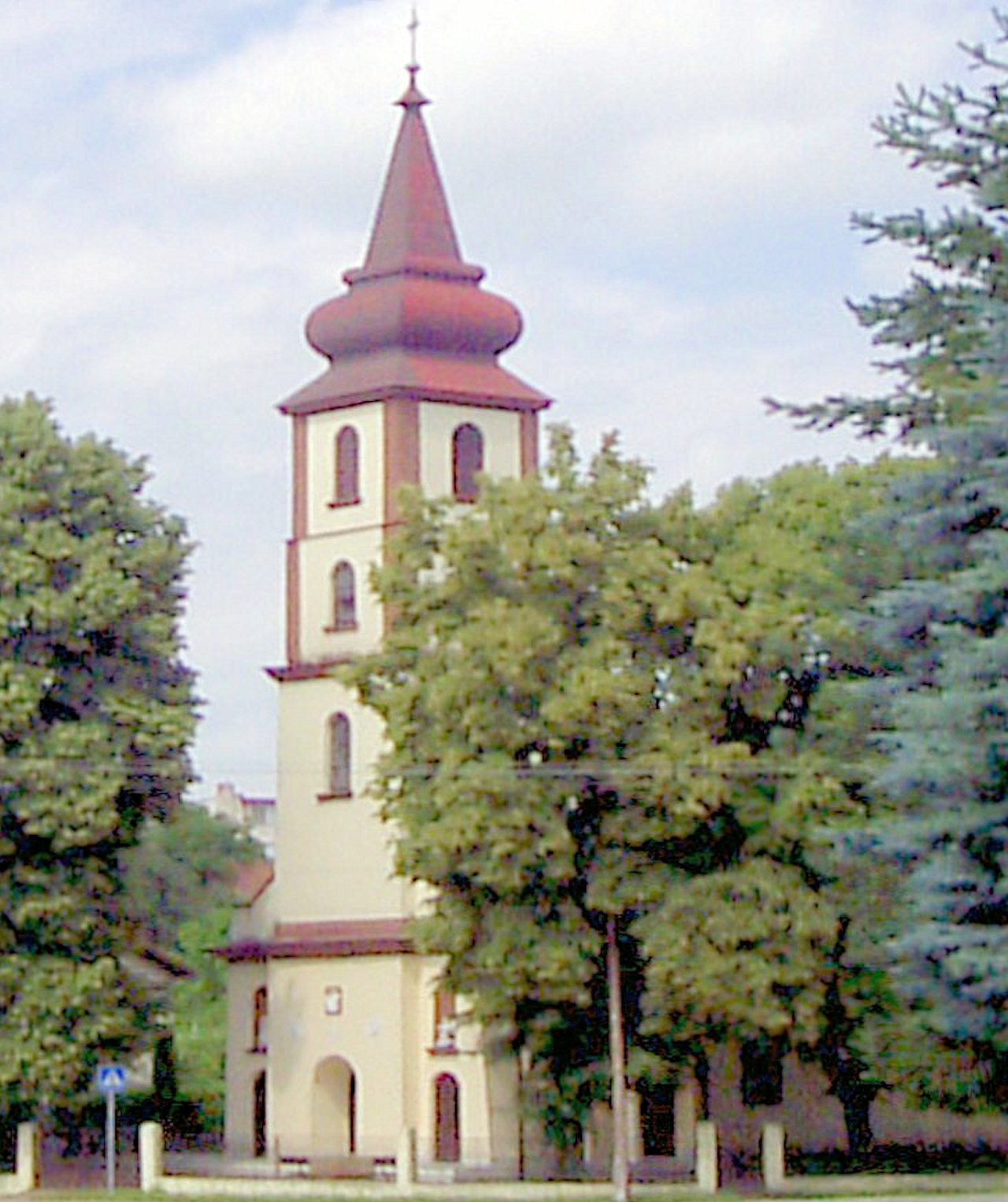

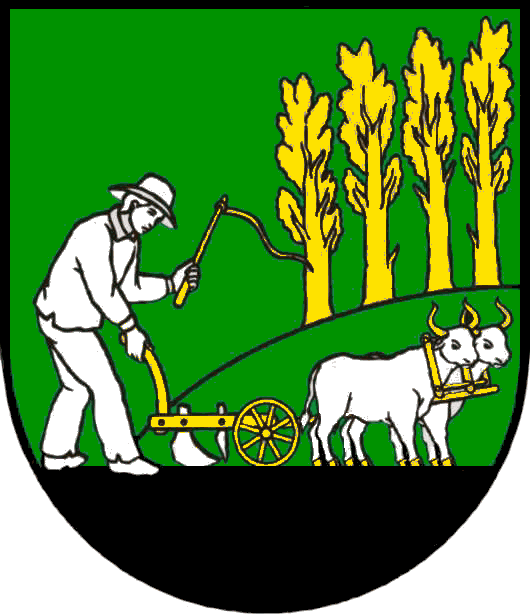
- Flag Coat of arms

- Location of Ruskov in the Košice Region Location of Ruskov in Slovakia
- Coordinates: 48.68°N 21.43°E
- Country: Slovakia
- Region: Košice Region
- District: Košice-okolie District
- First mentioned: 1303

Area
  - Total: 20.20 km^{2} (7.80 sq mi)
- Elevation: 228 m (748 ft)

Population (2025)
  - Total: 1,807
- Time zone: UTC+1 (CET)
  - Summer (DST): UTC+2 (CEST)
- Postal code: 441 9
- Area code: +421 55
- Vehicle registration plate (until 2022): KS
- Website: obecruskov.sk

Ruskov (Hungarian: Ruszka, Regeteruszka) is a village and municipality in Košice-okolie District in the Košice Region of eastern Slovakia.

== History ==
In historical records the village was first mentioned in 1303.

== Geography ==
The municipality lies at an altitude of 228 metres (748 ft) and covers an area of 20.20 km^{2} (7.80 sq mi) (2025).

== Population ==
Population statistic (10 years)
Year	1995	2005	2015	2025
Count	1324	1326	1454	1807
Difference		+0.15%	+9.65%	+24.27%

Population statistic
Year	2024	2025
Count	1778	1807
Difference		+1.63%

It has a population of 1807 people (31 December 2025).

=== Ethnicity ===
Census 2021 (1+ %)
Ethnicity	Number	Fraction
Slovak	1498	95.29%
Not found out	63	4%
Rusyn	16	1.01%
Total	1572	

In year 2021 was 1572 people by ethnicity 1498 as Slovak, 63 as Not found out, 16 as Rusyn, 12 as Czech, 11 as Other, 8 as Hungarian, 4 as Russian, 3 as Polish, 2 as Ukrainian, 2 as Albanian, 1 as Jewish, 1 as Vietnamese and 1 as Romani.

Note on population: The difference values of population numbers in the table "Population statistic" and in the sections "Ethnicity" & "Religion" is caused by the use of various statistical methods.

=== Religion ===
Census 2021 (1+ %)
Religion	Number	Fraction
Roman Catholic Church	1108	70.48%
None	210	13.36%
Calvinist Church	66	4.2%
Greek Catholic Church	64	4.07%
Not found out	61	3.88%
Evangelical Church	20	1.27%
Total	1572	

In year 2021 was 1572 people by religion 1108 from Roman Catholic Church, 210 from None, 66 from Calvinist Church, 64 from Greek Catholic Church, 61 from Not found out, 20 from Evangelical Church, 13 from Eastern Orthodox Church, 7 from Other and not ascertained christian church, 6 from Ad hoc movements, 4 from Jehovah's Witnesses, 4 from Other, 2 from Paganism and natural spirituality, 1 from Old Catholic Church, 1 from Islam, 1 from Hinduism, 1 from United Methodist Church, 1 from Seventh-day Adventist Church, 1 from Buddhism and 1 from Apostolic Church.

== Transport ==
The village has a railway station on the line from Košice to Čierna nad Tisou.
