= Füzérradvány =

- Village
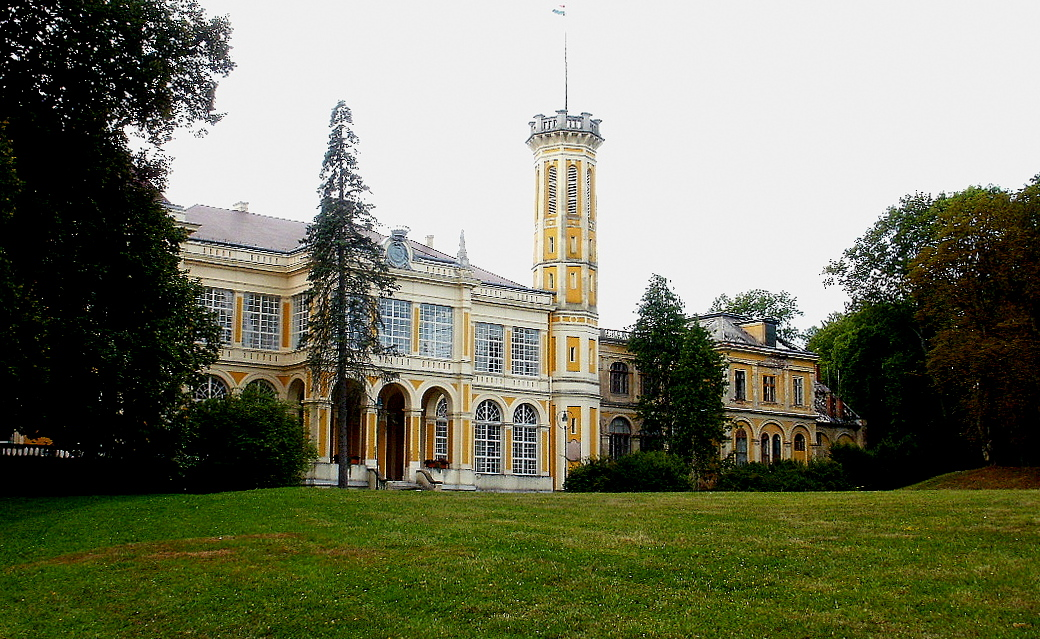

- Flag Coat of arms

- Location of Füzérradvány
- Coordinates: 48.48434°N 21.52658°E
- Country: Hungary
- Region: Northern Hungary
- County: Borsod-Abaúj-Zemplén
- District: Sátoraljaújhely

Area
  - Total: 9.85 km^{2} (3.80 sq mi)

Population (1 January 2025)
  - Total: 265
  - Density: 26.9/km^{2} (69.7/sq mi)
- Time zone: UTC+1 (CET)
  - Summer (DST): UTC+2 (CEST)
- Postal code: 3993
- Area code: (+36) 47

Füzérradvány is a village in Borsod-Abaúj-Zemplén county, Hungary.

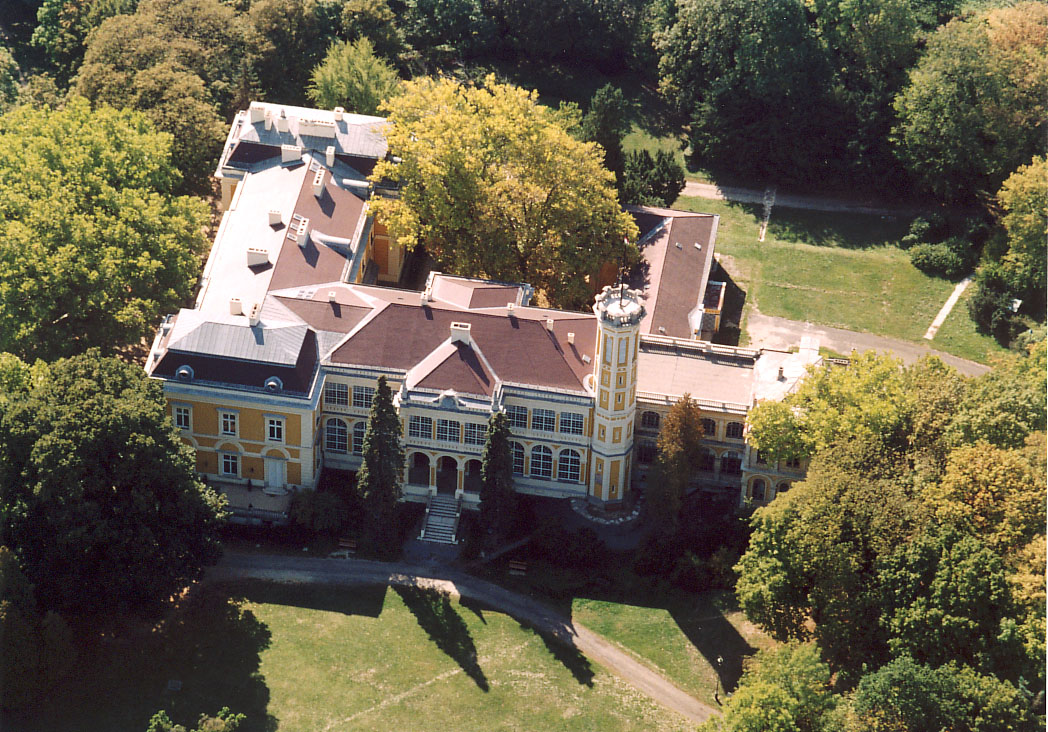
Füzérradvány, Károlyi-kastély

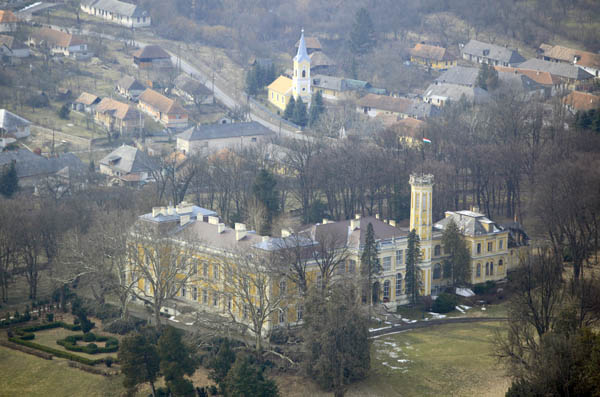

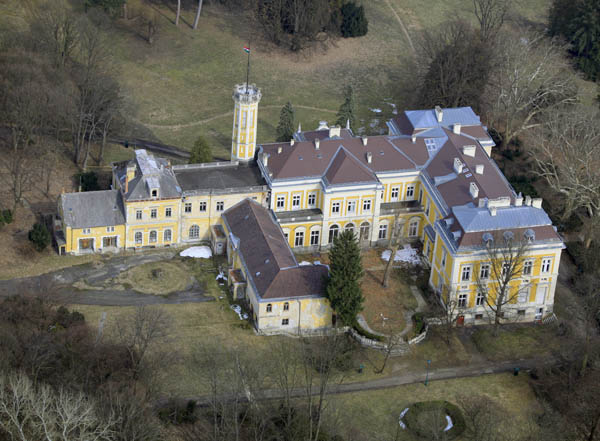

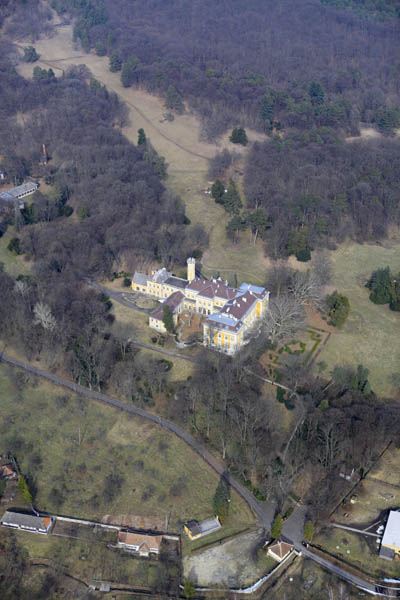
