= Bohdanovce =

Village and municipality in Košice-okolie, Kosice, Slovakia

Bohdanovce Garbócbogdány
- Municipality
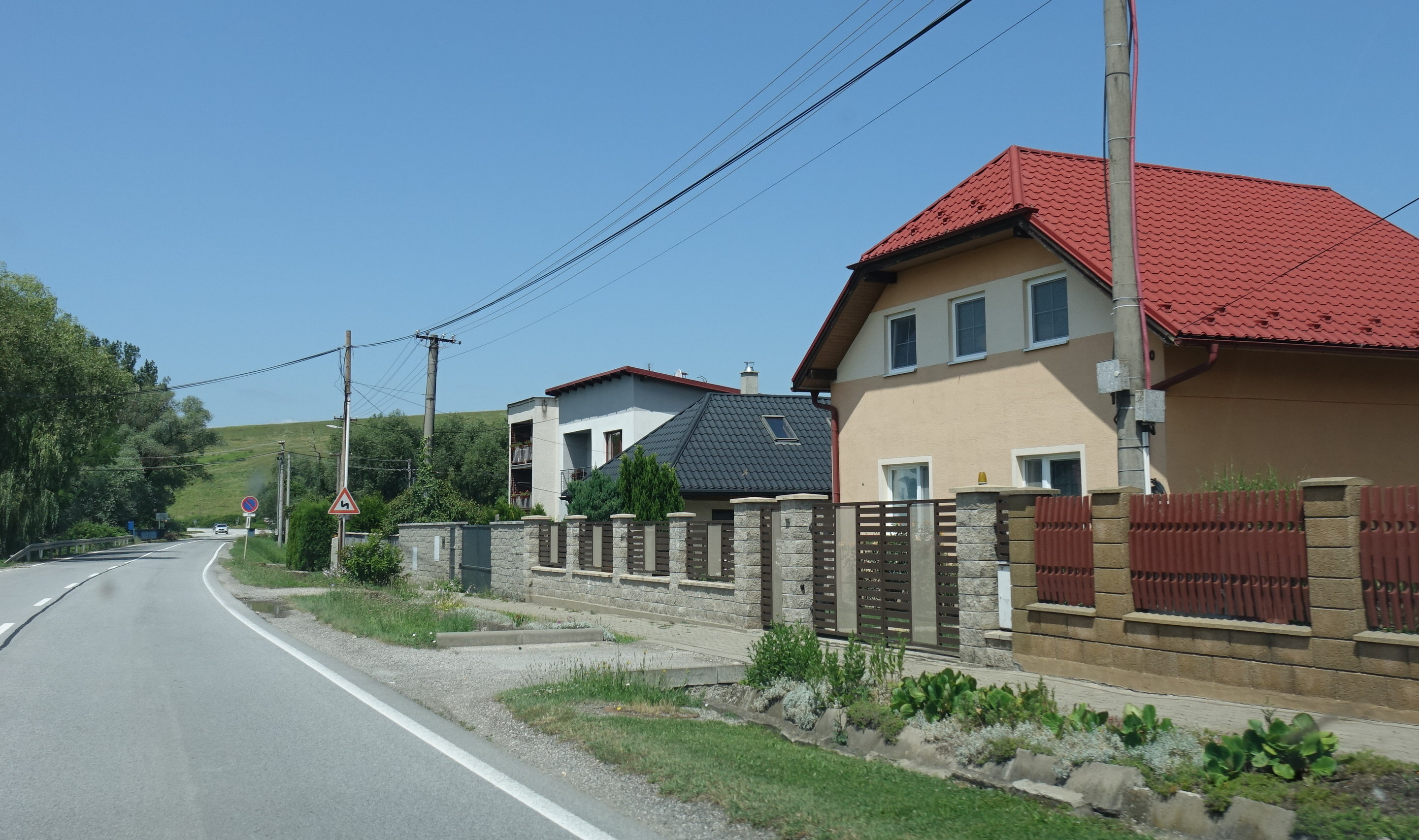

- Flag

- Location of Bohdanovce in the Košice Region Location of Bohdanovce in Slovakia
- Coordinates: 48.65°N 21.40°E
- Country: Slovakia
- Region: Košice Region
- District: Košice-okolie District
- First mentioned: 1299

Area
  - Total: 5.93 km^{2} (2.29 sq mi)
- Elevation: 210 m (690 ft)

Population (2025)
  - Total: 1,182
- Time zone: UTC+1 (CET)
  - Summer (DST): UTC+2 (CEST)
- Postal code: 441 6
- Area code: +421 55
- Vehicle registration plate (until 2022): KS
- Website: www.bohdanovce-ke.sk

Bohdanovce (Hungarian: Garbócbogdány) is a village and municipality in Košice-okolie District in the Kosice Region of eastern Slovakia.

== Geography ==
The municipality lies at an altitude of 210 metres (690 ft) and covers an area of 5.93 km^{2} (2.29 sq mi) (2025).

== Population ==
Population statistic (10 years)
Year	1995	2005	2015	2025
Count	944	967	1050	1182
Difference		+2.43%	+8.58%	+12.57%

Population statistic
Year	2024	2025
Count	1176	1182
Difference		+0.51%

It has a population of 1182 people (31 December 2025).

=== Ethnicity ===
Census 2021 (1+ %)
Ethnicity	Number	Fraction
Slovak	1104	97.95%
Romani	17	1.5%
Hungarian	16	1.41%
Rusyn	14	1.24%
Not found out	12	1.06%
Total	1127	

In year 2021 was 1127 people by ethnicity 1104 as Slovak, 17 as Romani, 16 as Hungarian, 14 as Rusyn, 12 as Not found out, 5 as Other, 4 as Czech, 1 as Polish, 1 as Canadian and 1 as Bulgarian.

Note on population: The difference values of population numbers in the table "Population statistic" and in the sections "Ethnicity" & "Religion" is caused by the use of various statistical methods.

=== Religion ===
Census 2021 (1+ %)
Religion	Number	Fraction
Roman Catholic Church	678	60.16%
None	169	15%
Calvinist Church	148	13.13%
Greek Catholic Church	48	4.26%
Evangelical Church	25	2.22%
Not found out	23	2.04%
Eastern Orthodox Church	14	1.24%
Jehovah's Witnesses	12	1.06%
Total	1127	

In year 2021 was 1127 people by religion 678 from Roman Catholic Church, 169 from None, 148 from Calvinist Church, 48 from Greek Catholic Church, 25 from Evangelical Church, 23 from Not found out, 14 from Eastern Orthodox Church, 12 from Jehovah's Witnesses, 3 from Other, 2 from Christian Congregations in Slovakia, 2 from Ad hoc movements, 1 from Jewish community, 1 from Old Catholic Church and 1 from Other and not ascertained christian church.

== Genealogical resources ==
The records for genealogical research are available at the state archive "Statny Archiv in Kosice, Slovakia"

- Reformed church records (births/marriages/deaths): 1728-1899 (parish A)

== See also ==
- List of municipalities and towns in Slovakia
