= Bačkov, Trebišov District =

Bačkov Bacskó
- Municipality
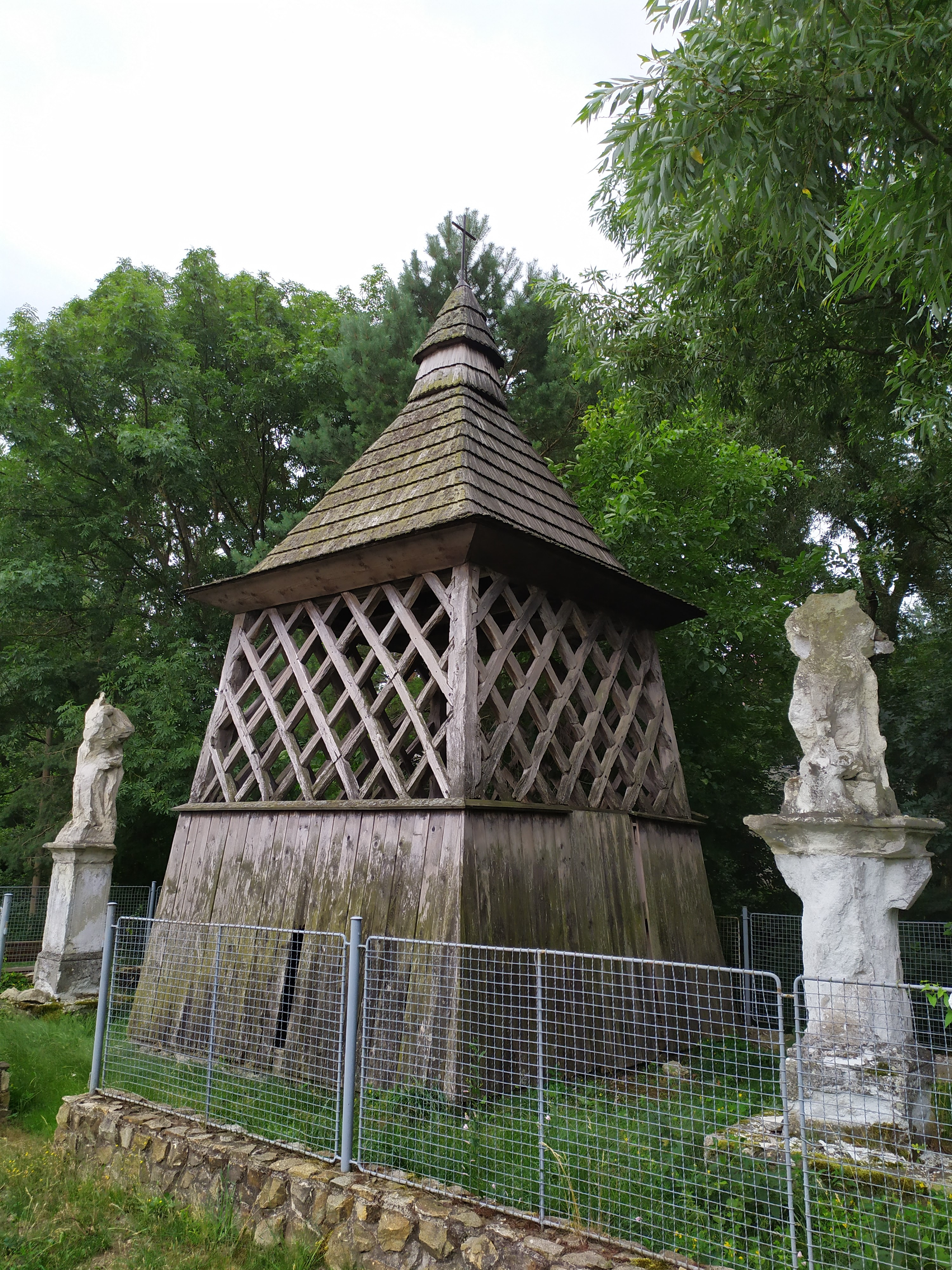

- Flag

- Location of Bačkov in the Košice Region Location of Bačkov in Slovakia
- Coordinates: 48.74°N 21.63°E
- Country: Slovakia
- Region: Košice Region
- District: Trebišov District
- First mentioned: 1320

Area
  - Total: 27.67 km^{2} (10.68 sq mi)
- Elevation: 200 m (660 ft)

Population (2025)
  - Total: 774
- Time zone: UTC+1 (CET)
  - Summer (DST): UTC+2 (CEST)
- Postal code: 766 1
- Area code: +421 56
- Vehicle registration plate (until 2022): TV
- Website: www.obecbackov.sk

Bačkov (Slovak pronunciation: [ˈbatʂkɔw]; Hungarian: Bacskó) is a village and municipality in the Trebišov District in the Košice Region of eastern Slovakia.

== Geography ==
The municipality lies at an altitude of 200 metres (660 ft) and covers an area of 27.67 km^{2} (10.68 sq mi) (2025).

== Population ==
Population statistic (10 years)
Year	1995	2005	2015	2025
Count	586	620	676	774
Difference		+5.80%	+9.03%	+14.49%

Population statistic
Year	2024	2025
Count	754	774
Difference		+2.65%

It has a population of 774 people (31 December 2025).

=== Ethnicity ===
Census 2021 (1+ %)
Ethnicity	Number	Fraction
Slovak	683	96.06%
Romani	53	7.45%
Not found out	24	3.37%
Total	711	

In year 2021 was 711 people by ethnicity 683 as Slovak, 53 as Romani, 24 as Not found out, 7 as Russian, 5 as Czech, 3 as Rusyn, 1 as Ukrainian and 1 as Hungarian.

Note on population: The difference values of population numbers in the table "Population statistic" and in the sections "Ethnicity" & "Religion" is caused by the use of various statistical methods.

=== Religion ===
Census 2021 (1+ %)
Religion	Number	Fraction
Greek Catholic Church	395	55.56%
Roman Catholic Church	224	31.5%
None	57	8.02%
Not found out	17	2.39%
Total	711	

In year 2021 was 711 people by religion 395 from Greek Catholic Church, 224 from Roman Catholic Church, 57 from None, 17 from Not found out, 5 from Eastern Orthodox Church, 5 from Seventh-day Adventist Church, 4 from Evangelical Church, 3 from Calvinist Church and 1 from Paganism and natural spirituality.

== Notable person ==
- The botanist and entomologist Imre Frivaldszky (1799-1870) was born in Bačkov (then Bacskó, Hungary).

== Genealogical resources ==
The records for genealogical research are available at the state archive in Košice (Slovak: Štátny archív v Košiciach).

- Roman Catholic church records (births/marriages/deaths): 1727–1895
- Greek Catholic church records (births/marriages/deaths): 1841–1880 (parish A)
- Lutheran church records (births/marriages/deaths): 1783–1895
- Reformated church records (births/marriages/deaths): 1749–1896
- Census records 1869 of Backov are available at the state archive.

== See also ==
- List of municipalities and towns in Slovakia
