= Kokšov-Bakša =

Village and municipality in Slovakia

- Municipality
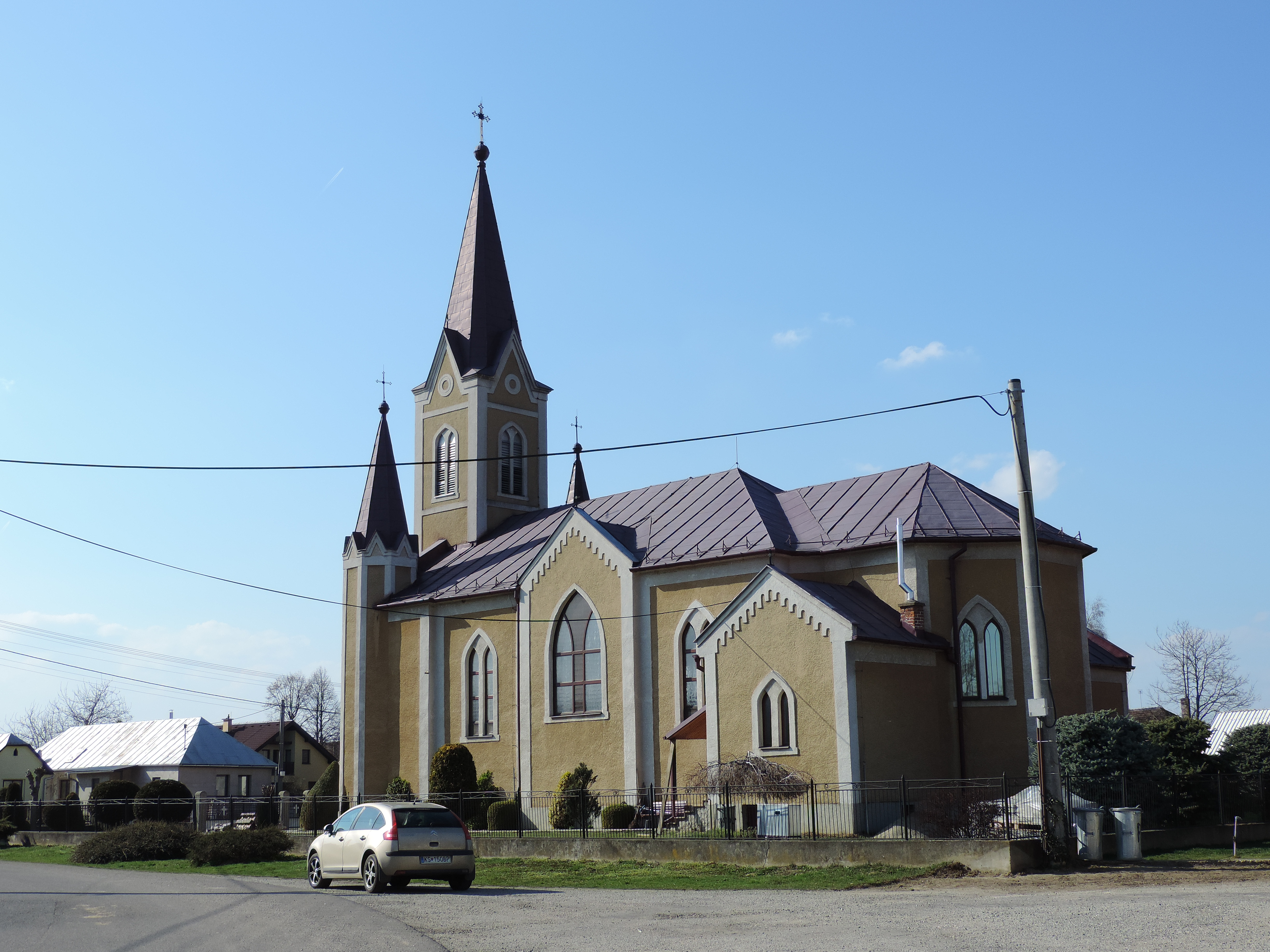

- Flag Coat of arms

- Location of Kokšov-Bakša in the Košice Region Location of Kokšov-Bakša in Slovakia
- Coordinates: 48.65°N 21.32°E
- Country: Slovakia
- Region: Košice Region
- District: Košice-okolie District
- First mentioned: 1262

Area
  - Total: 3.56 km^{2} (1.37 sq mi)
- Elevation: 183 m (600 ft)

Population (2025)
  - Total: 1,360
- Time zone: UTC+1 (CET)
  - Summer (DST): UTC+2 (CEST)
- Postal code: 441 3
- Area code: +421 55
- Vehicle registration plate (until 2022): KS
- Website: www.koksovbaksa.sk

Kokšov-Bakša (Slovak pronunciation: [ˈkɔkʂɔw ˈbakʂa], Hungarian: Koksóbaksa) is a village and municipality in Košice-okolie District in the Kosice Region of eastern Slovakia.

== History ==
The village was first mentioned in historical records in 1262. Prior to the Treaty of Trianon, it was part of Abaúj-Torna county.

== Geography ==
The municipality lies at an altitude of 183 metres (600 ft) and covers an area of 3.56 km^{2} (1.37 sq mi) (2025).

== Population ==
Population statistic (10 years)
Year	1995	2005	2015	2025
Count	1084	1075	1184	1360
Difference		−0.83%	+10.13%	+14.86%

Population statistic
Year	2024	2025
Count	1335	1360
Difference		+1.87%

It has a population of 1360 people (31 December 2025).

=== Ethnicity ===
Census 2021 (1+ %)
Ethnicity	Number	Fraction
Slovak	1212	96.88%
Not found out	34	2.71%
Total	1251	

In year 2021 was 1251 people by ethnicity 1212 as Slovak, 34 as Not found out, 7 as Rusyn, 2 as Romani, 2 as Polish, 2 as Hungarian, 2 as Other, 1 as Jewish, 1 as Czech, 1 as Ukrainian, 1 as Russian, 1 as German and 1 as Bulgarian.

Note on population: The difference values of population numbers in the table "Population statistic" and in the sections "Ethnicity" & "Religion" is caused by the use of various statistical methods.

=== Religion ===
Census 2021 (1+ %)
Religion	Number	Fraction
Roman Catholic Church	1020	81.53%
None	113	9.03%
Greek Catholic Church	37	2.96%
Not found out	33	2.64%
Evangelical Church	21	1.68%
Total	1251	

In year 2021 was 1251 people by religion 1020 from Roman Catholic Church, 113 from None, 37 from Greek Catholic Church, 33 from Not found out, 21 from Evangelical Church, 7 from Apostolic Church, 5 from Calvinist Church, 4 from Baptists Church, 3 from Islam, 2 from Christian Congregations in Slovakia, 2 from Ad hoc movements, 1 from Jehovah's Witnesses, 1 from Other, 1 from Hinduism and 1 from United Methodist Church.

== Genealogical resources ==
The records for genealogical research are available at the state archive "Statny Archiv in Kosice, Slovakia"

- Roman Catholic church records (births/marriages/deaths): 1787-1896 (parish B)

== See also ==
- List of municipalities and towns in Slovakia
