= Track gauge in Slovakia =

Rail gauge in Slovakia. The track gauge for most lines in Slovakia is the international standard gauge of 1,435 mm (4 ft 8 1/2 in).

== Russian gauge – 1520 mm ==
Two lines connecting to Ukraine are "Russian broad gauge", 1,520 mm (4 ft 11 27/32 in):

- Užhorod–Haniska pri Košiciach,
- Čop–Čierna nad Tisou.

A tripartite memorandum of understanding was signed on 25 November 2008 between Russia, Ukraine, and Slovakia on the construction of a broad-gauge line to the Austrian border. Austrian chancellor Werner Faymann announced on 30 April 2009 that his government politically supports the construction of a broad-gauge line from the Austro-Slovak border to Vienna. The Slovak Prime Minister Iveta Radičová announced on November 2010, the Slovak government will not support the project, as it threatens the Slovak workplaces in the Dobrá bulk terminal, which would be unnecessary after the completion of the project.

== Metre gauge – 1000 mm ==
- Tatra Electric Railways / Tatranské Elektrické Železnice (TEŽ)
  - Poprad-Tatry–Starý Smokovec–Štrbské Pleso
  - Tatranská Lomnica–Starý Smokovec
  - Štrba–Štrbské Pleso cog-wheel
- Starý Smokovec–Hrebienok funicular (TMR)
- Čermeľ–Alpinka children's railway (DPMK)
- Trams in Bratislava (DPB)

== Bosnian gauge – 760 mm ==
- Trenčianske Teplice–Trenčianska Teplá tramway (TREŽ)
- Čierny Hron Railway (ČHŽ)
  - Vydrovo-Konečná–Čierny Balog–Chvatimech
  - Čierny Balog–Dobroč
- Agricultural Museum Railway in Nitra
- Kubátkovia–Tanečník railway in Vychylovka (HLÚŽ-OKLŽ)
- Váh' River Forrest Railway / Považská lesná železnica (PLŽ) in Pribylina

== See also ==
- Rail transport in Slovakia
