= Solomonovo =

Solomonovo Соломоново Tiszasalamon
- Village
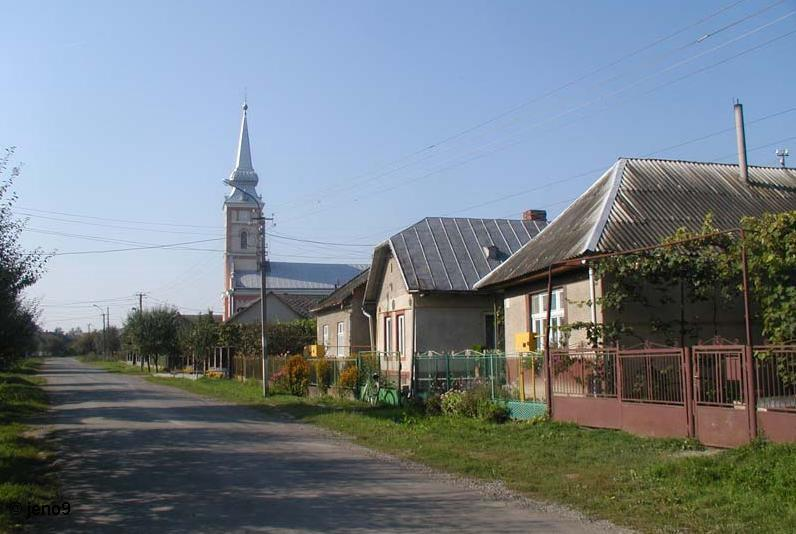

- Location within Ukraine Location within Zakarpattia Oblast
- Coordinates: 48°25′50″N 22°9′50″E
- Country: Ukraine
- Oblast: Zakarpattia Oblast
- Raion: Uzhhorod Raion
- Hromada: Chop urban hromada
- Established: 1332

Area
  - Total: 6.15 km^{2} (2.37 sq mi)
- Elevation: 105 m (344 ft)

Population (2001)
  - Total: 1,342
  - Density: 218/km^{2} (565/sq mi)
- Time zone: UTC+2 (EET)
  - Summer (DST): UTC+3 (EEST)
- Postal code: 89460
- Area code: +380 312

Solomonovo (Ukrainian: Соломоново; Hungarian: Tiszasalamon, Salamon) is a village in Uzhhorod Raion (district) of Zakarpattia Oblast (province) in western Ukraine. It is located 2 km (1.2 mi) west of the Chop railway station. It had a population of 1,342, according to the 2001 census.

It is the most western Ukrainian municipality. The distance to the most eastern village Rannya Zorya in the Luhansk Oblast is 1,500 km (930 mi). The village is located in close proximity to the city of Chop and Ukrainian border with Hungary and Slovakia.

The village is well known for its Škoda owned Eurocar subsidiary. Situated on the Highway M06 (part of the European route E573), in the village is located vehicle border crossing with Hungary Chop–Tysa to Záhony and railway border crossing with Slovakia Chop–Strazh to Čierna nad Tisou.

According to the Ukrainian Census, about 60% of the population speak Hungarian, while over 37% speak the Ukrainian language.

== People born here ==
- Petro Maha, Ukrainian lyricist, Merited Artist of Ukraine

== Gallery ==
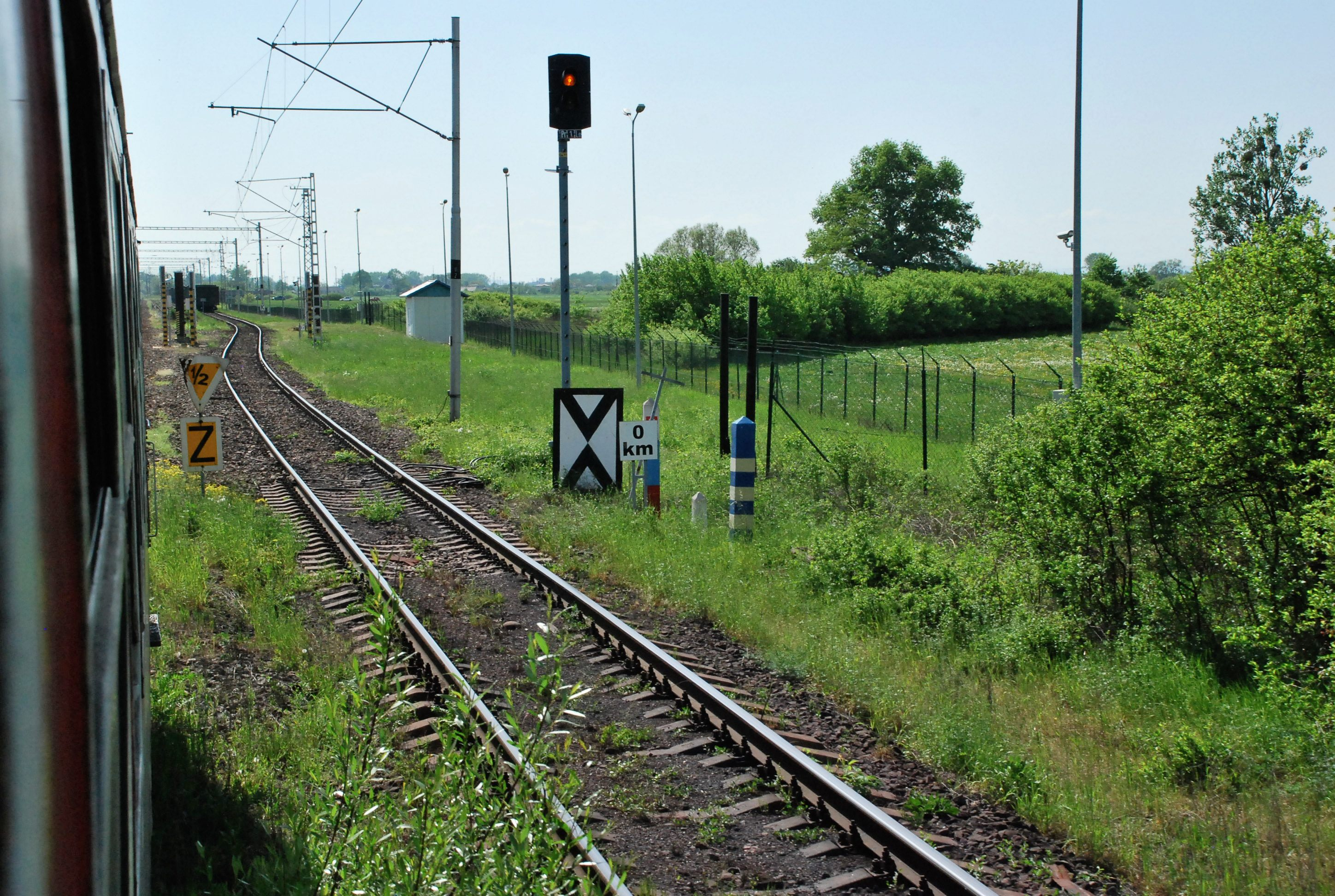
Slovak-Ukrainian state border

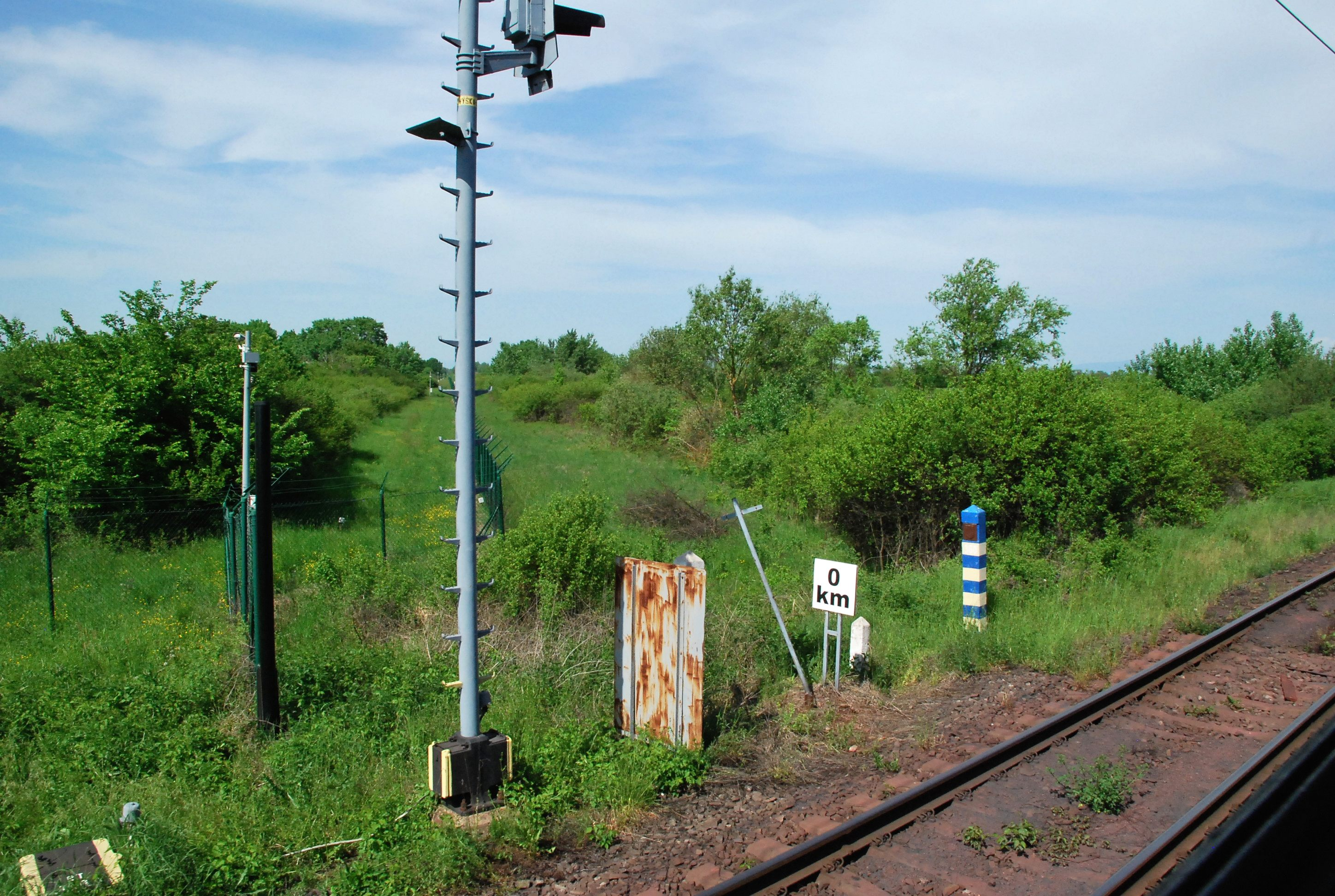
Boundary stone with a security camera

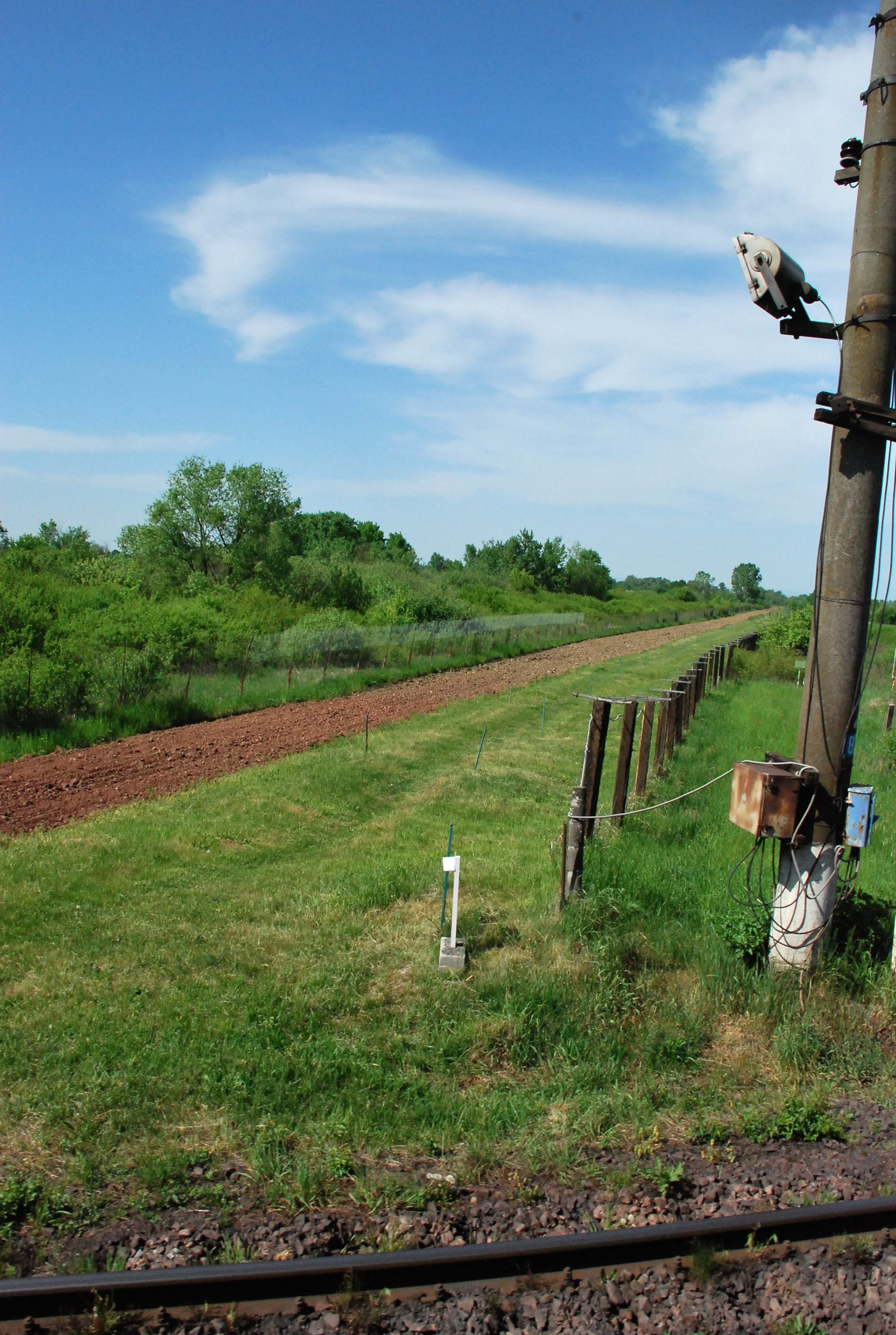
Security electric fence with a ploughed trace-control strip.

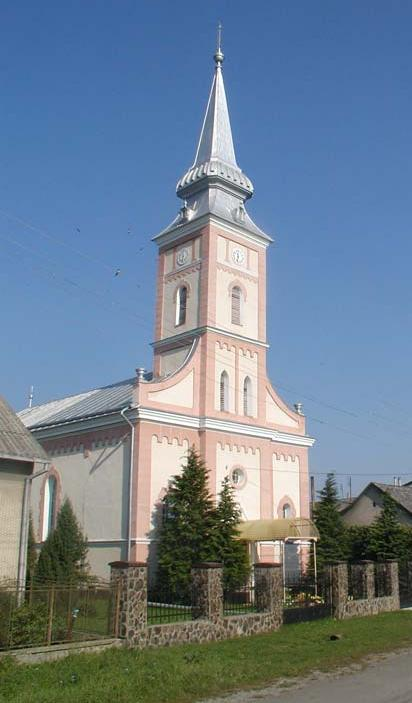
Church

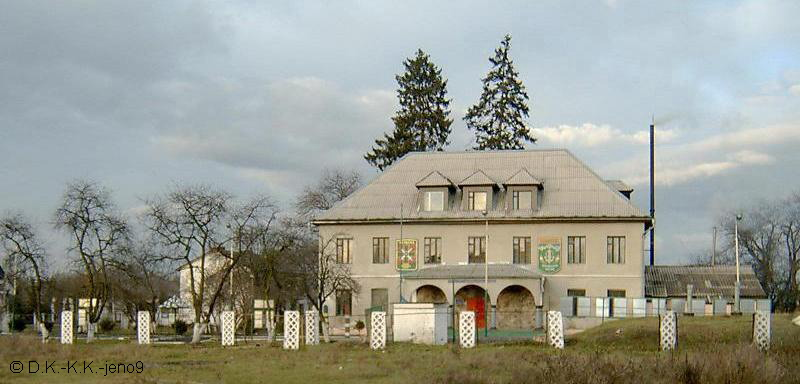
Municipal office
