= Košice–Vienna broad-gauge line =

Planned railway line in Slovakia and Austria

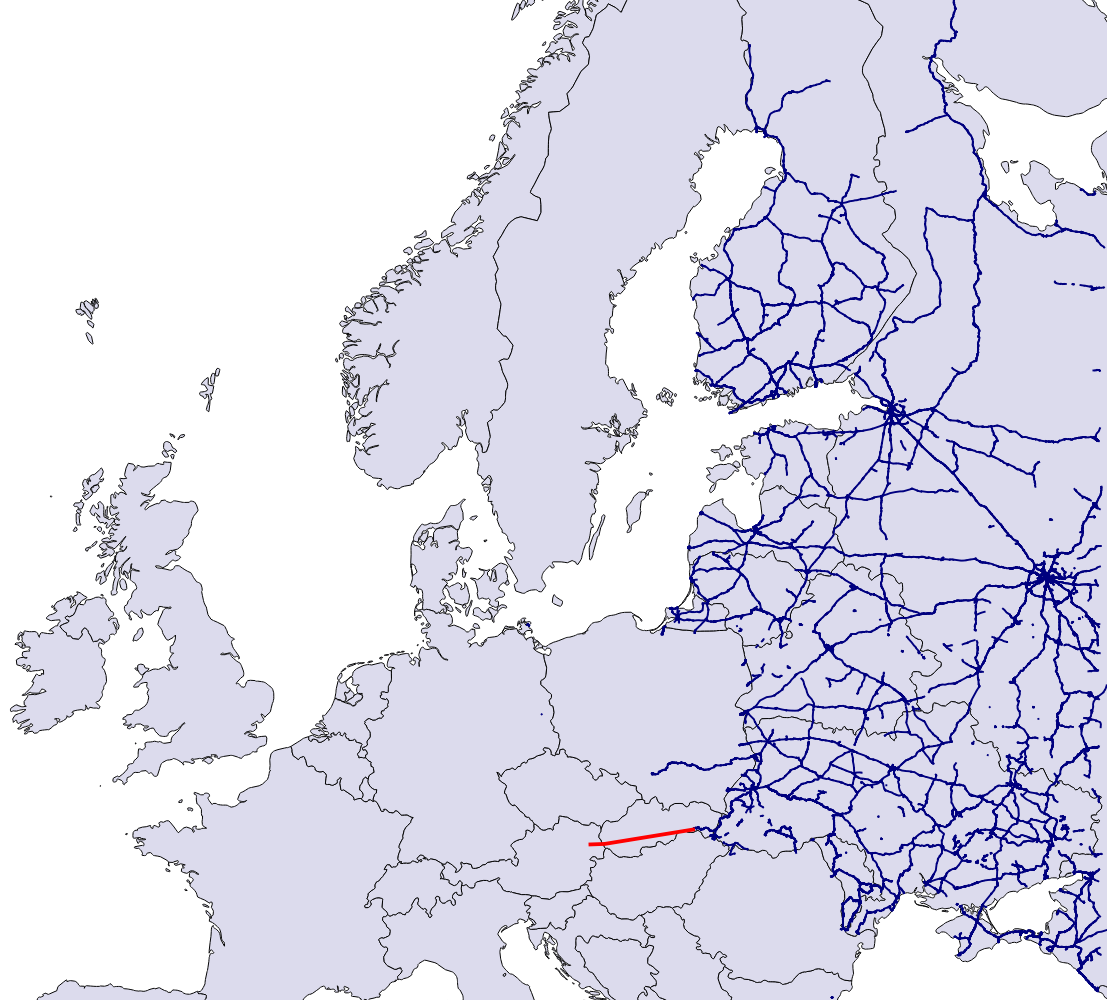
The Košice-Vienna broad-gauge line (red)

The Košice–Vienna broad-gauge line (Slovak: Široká koľaj do Viedne, German: Breitspurstrecke Košice–Wien) was a proposal to extend the 1,520 mm (4 ft 11 27/32 in) Russian gauge (broad-gauge) railway line from the city of Košice in eastern Slovakia to Vienna and Bratislava. It would have created an 8,000-kilometre (5,000-mile) rail transport corridor linking Western Europe and China.

The proposal was part of the Eurasian Land Bridge initiative to create a continuous rail connection between Europe and East Asia.

The proposal became defunct after Russia's invasion of Ukraine in 2014 and again in 2022. Austria announced in 2022 that it had no intention to proceed with the project.

== Broad gauge ==
The most commonly used railway gauge in Western Europe is 1,435 mm (4 ft 8 1/2 in), while Eastern Europe uses 1,520 mm (60 in). Russian gauge railways link more than 15 countries, including the Commonwealth of Independent States, the Baltic states, Mongolia and Finland. This gauge is the primary gauge of Russia's railways, making it possible to transport freight directly from Eastern Europe to the Far East.

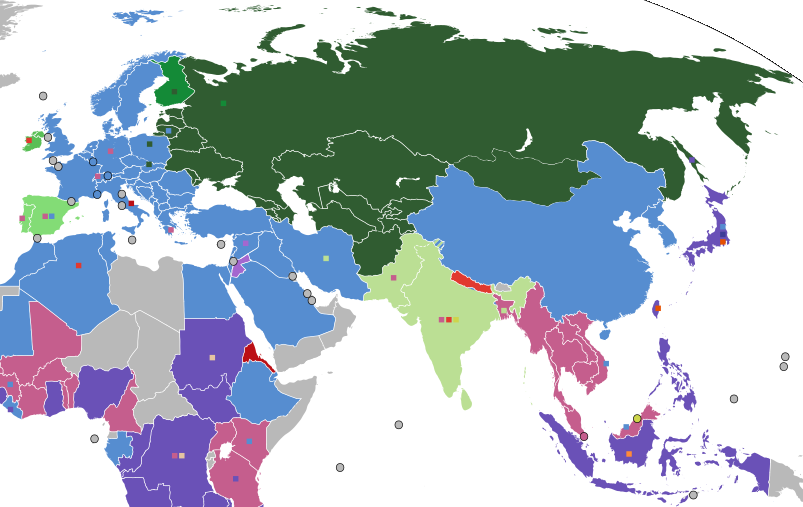
Most commonly used rail gauges in the countries of Eurasia. Countries having Russian gauge rail networks

In total, there are over 150,000 kilometres (93,000 mi) of Russian gauge railway lines, comprising 18% of all rail lines in the world.

There are several individual Russian gauge lines in countries where this gauge is not the standard, including:

- In Poland: the 400-kilometre (250 mi)-long Broad Gauge Metallurgy Line – (Polish: Linia Hutnicza Szerokotorowa, known by its abbreviation LHS);
- In Romania: the line connecting Moldova and the iron and steel works at Galați;
- In Slovakia: broad-gauge lines from Uzhhorod (Matevce) to Košice and from Čierna nad Tisou to Chop (Ukraine).

The westernmost point on the broad-gauge network is in the town of Sławków in southern Poland, where the LHS ends.

Moving freight on the broad-gauge network is considered less expensive, as the lines can take more cargo (higher axle weight limits and higher maximum trainloads). Wider rolling stock can also be used on this gauge.

== New railway lines to Vienna ==
East–west international transport corridor (based on one of the Orient Express routes)

The aim of the project is to expand European rail network by laying Russian gauge tracks from Košice in eastern Slovakia to Vienna, creating an uninterrupted transport chain from Russia, China, Japan and other Asian countries to Central Europe. This will directly connect the European railway network (as well as the Danube River transport system) with the Trans-Siberian Railway.

The vast majority of freight shipments between the EU, Russia and the Asian Pacific Region currently go by sea via the Suez Canal, a distance of between 17,000 and 22,000 kilometres (11,000 and 14,000 mi). By extending the broad-gauge line, the promoters of the Košice–Vienna project aim to make the Trans-Siberian Railway more competitive vis-à-vis the sea routes. By eliminating the need to change bogies, freight delivery times from East Asia to Europe will be cut by 14 days to just half of the time required for transportation by sea. And as there will be no freight transshipment the risk of accidental damage to cargo could be reduced. Russian Railways CEO Vladimir Yakunin believes it is the faster freight delivery that will make the project competitive.

Map of the transport corridor network in Europe. One of the biggest transport hubs is located near Vienna.

The project will require a 450-kilometre (280 mi) extension to the broad-gauge line and associated infrastructure, as well as reconstruction of the existing Russian gauge railway line within Slovakia, from the border station at Matovce to Haniska pri Kosiciach (Košice) – a distance of 87 kilometres (54 mi). A new transport terminal will also be built in the vicinity of Vienna and Bratislava.

The new track is to be laid alongside the existing standard gauge line. Commissioning of the new line is planned by 2025. The Vienna–Bratislava transport hub will become the most westerly point on the Russian gauge network.

== History of the project ==
The idea of building a Russian gauge broad-gauge railway line from Haniska pri Košiciach station to Eastern Europe was first suggested by Russian Railways CEO Vladimir Yakunin in May 2006 at the Strategic Partnership 1520 international forum. In 2008, Russia, Ukraine, Slovakia and Austria set up a joint company to build the broad-gauge line from the Slovak city of Košice to the international logistics terminal in Vienna. The company was given the name Breitspur Planungsgesellschaft mbH and is equally owned by the national railway companies of the participating countries (ÖBB, ŽSR, UZ and Russian Railways).

On 6 April 2010, a four-party agreement was signed between the participating countries. Russia was represented at that meeting by its president, Dmitry Medvedev.

In December 2010 Roland Berger Strategy Consultants completed a project feasibility study. According to the published findings of this study, there are no technical or legal barriers to implementing the project.

In June 2012, a delegation from the EU led by Transport Commissioner Siim Kallas voiced its support for the project at a conference in Sochi.

In August 2013, the participating countries announced a tender for technical design work on the project infrastructure.

In March 2014, Russian Railways CEO Vladimir Yakunin announced a project to link Europe and Asia via a multi-purpose transport corridor known as the Trans-European Development Belt. The project envisages laying not only long-distance railway lines, but also pipelines for the transportation of oil, gas, water and power, as well as all types of communication from the Pacific Ocean to the Atlantic.

In February 2014, Russia had invaded Crimea and occupied the Donbas; in February 2022, Russia commenced a further land and airborne assault on eastern, central and Western Ukraine. Since that time, there has been no progress on the project. In May 2021, the Austrian government stated that it has no plans to approve the construction of the line. ÖBB withdrew from the joint planning company in 2022.

== Finance ==
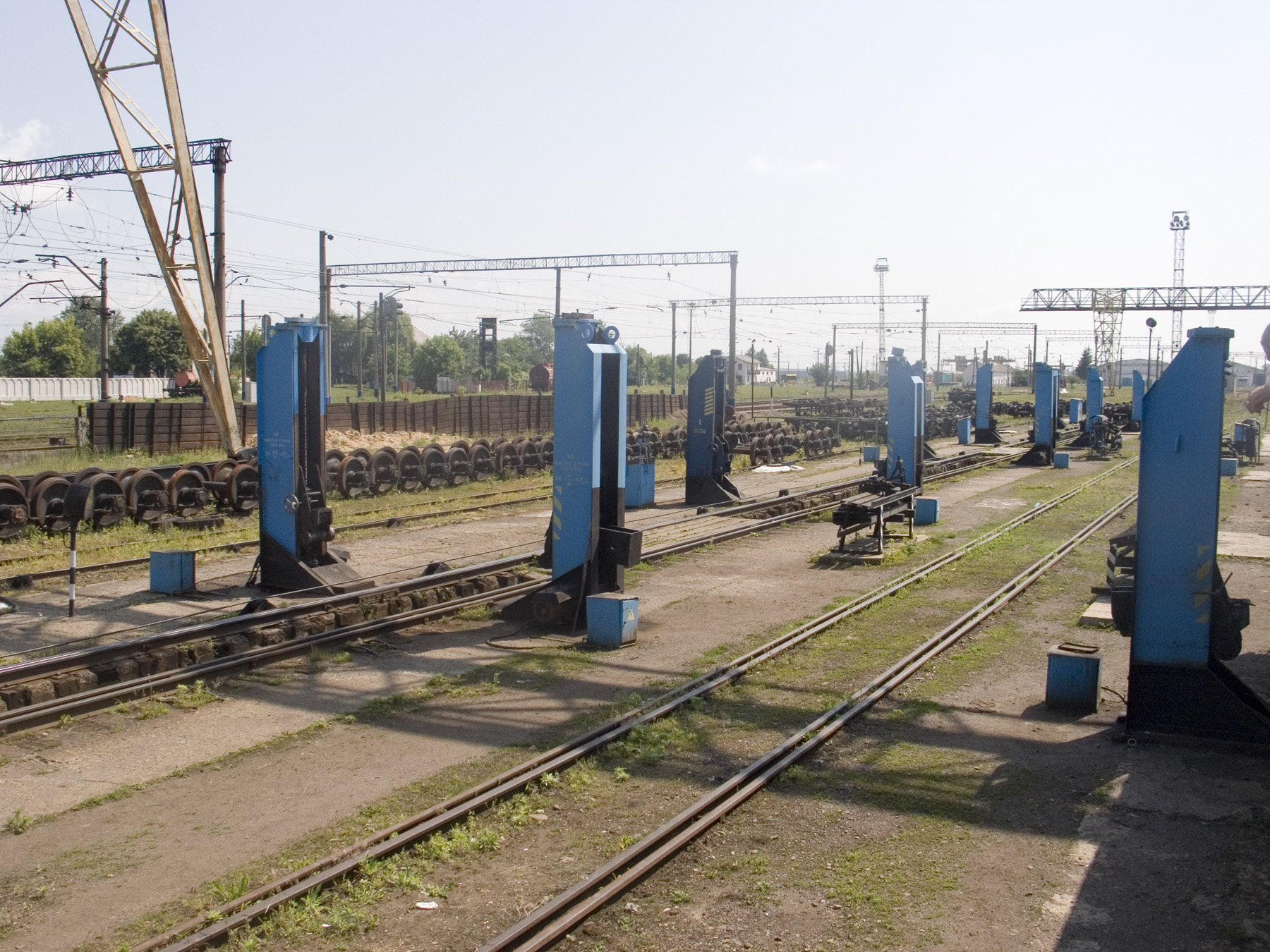
Bogie changing station. The need to change bogies complicates freight transportation between countries with different rail gauges.

Preliminary estimates place the cost of the project at 6.3 billion euros. A further €240 million will be required for the terminals and €130 million for additional rolling stock.

Freight traffic between Košice and Bratislava could reach 24 million tonnes per annum by 2025 (19 million tonnes between Bratislava and Vienna). During the construction and operation the project will create 642,000 new jobs (including 11,000 jobs connected with work on the new line infrastructure). The project could also provide a boost of 12 billion euros to the GDPs of the participating countries.

Market research shows that most of the freight moving westwards along the new route will be containers, iron ore and metals. 30% of all cargo will be transported from west to east. The project will link up freight flows from 37 countries across Eurasia.

Siim Kallas believes that rail traffic between the EU and its eastern neighbours is likely to increase by 30% between 2007 and 2020.

Russian Railways plans to invest $2–3 billion in the project, which it will raise by issuing Eurobonds.

== Opinions ==
Siim Kallas thinks that the main problem with this project is the customs fees in Russia, which result in international freight forwarders paying more than Russian companies.

In the view of Polish representatives, the project has a political subtext in that it could potentially be used to economically isolate Poland and its lone Russian-gauge railway line that also originates in Ukraine.

In 2013, Ukrainian Railways Director General Serhiy Bolobolin has stated that the project is vitally important for Ukraine and the entire European transport system.
