= Uzhhorod–Košice broad-gauge track =

Russian gauge freight railway in Slovakia

Košice–Uzhhorod broad gauge line
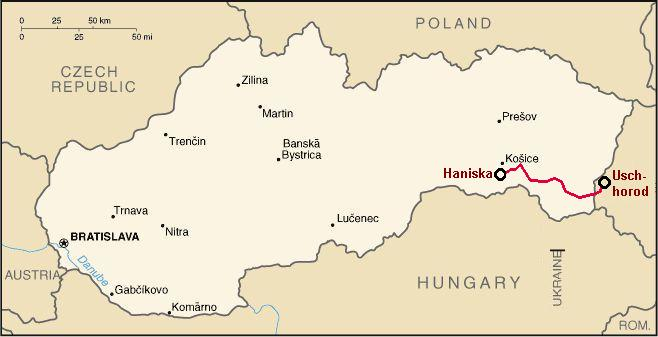

Technical
- Track gauge: 1,520 mm (4 ft 11 27/32 in)

The Uzhhorod–Košice broad-gauge line is a single-track 1,520 mm (4 ft 11 27/32 in) gauge railway mostly in eastern Slovakia, which is used especially for transporting iron ore from Ukraine to the steel works near Košice.

In the 1960s, after construction of the steel works in Košice, imports of iron ore to Slovakia rose steeply, and the checkpoint in Čierna nad Tisou could not handle this volume, particularly in winter, as Czechoslovakia and the Soviet Union had different gauges and all freight had to be transshipped. It was thus decided to build a Russian gauge line in Czechoslovakia to ease the bottleneck. Construction started on 4 November 1965, and the line opened on 1 May 1966. It was electrified in 1978.

Trains are hauled by two electric twin-unit locomotives, similar to the late versions of PKP's ET40 but with SA3 couplers instead of buffers and chain couplings, except of westbound between Trebišov and Ruskov where the gradient is over 15 ‰ and two sets of locos are needed. The train weights are up to 4,200 tonnes (4,100 long tons; 4,600 short tons). This stretch has the heaviest catenary construction in the EU (2 work cables, 1 fitting cable and 3 additional cables).

This line is for freight only, but there are some diesel motor cars for railway personnel.

== Technical parameters ==
- Length: 88.051 km (54.712 mi) (8 km (5 mi) in Ukraine).
- Gauge: 1,520 mm (4 ft 11 27/32 in).
- Electrification: 3 kV DC overhead.
- Maximum speed: from Uzhhorod to Maťovce 50 km/h (31 mph), from Maťovce to Haniska pri Košiciach 60 km/h (37 mph).
- Stations: 2 (Maťovce, Haniska pri Košiciach).
- Crossing loops: 6 (Vojany, Budkovce, Trebišov, Červený Dvor, Slančík, Hornád).
- Depots: 1 (Haniska pri Košiciach).

== Extension ==
There are plans to extend the line 450 km (280 mi) westwards to Vienna in Austria. An agreement was signed between the railway operators of Austria, Slovakia, Ukraine and Russia in April 2010; they formed a new company, Breitspur Planungsgesellschaft, to develop the railway. In November 2010, the Slovak Prime Minister Iveta Radičová announced the Slovak government will not support the project, as it threatens the viability of the Košice area workplaces in the Dobrá bulk terminal, which would be unnecessary after the completion of the project. However, the project passed a feasibility study in December 2010. Construction was planned to start in 2013 and operation in 2016. The cost estimate is €6 bn. It will prove important (if really built) for the transport of containers, between Western Europe and Russia and China.

In May 2021 the Austrian government stated that it has no plans to approve the construction of the extension of the line.

== See also ==
- Čierna nad Tisou railway station, the break-of-gauge station for most other broad-gauge freight entering Slovakia from Ukraine
- Broad Gauge Metallurgy Line
- Košice–Vienna broad-gauge line
