= Slančík (disambiguation) =

Slančík is a village in Slovakia.

Slančík may also refer to:

== People ==
- Adrián Slančík (born 1999), Slovak footballer
- Fabián Slančík (born 1991), Slovak footballer
