= Petro Maha =

Petro Maha is a Ukrainian-Rusyn actor, song and playwright, television host, and one of the presenters of the Shuster LIVE political show. He is an author of lyrics for several Ukrainian singers including Pavlo Zibrov. Maha is a Merited Artist of Ukraine.

== Career ==
Maha was born in village Solomonovo (or Strazh), Uzhhorod Raion in a family of railroad workers. In 1987 after graduating the Russophone high school N1 in Chop (at that time city of Uzhhorod Raion), he worked as a locomotive mechanic at the Chop rail depot (Lviv Railways). While a student in high school, Maha became a laureate of the All-Union theatric festival of propaganda (agitation) collectives. In 1989-1993 he was a student of the Faculty of performing art (Professor Zymna actor shop) at the Karpenko-Karyi State Institute of Theatric Arts.

After graduating, in 1993-1999 Maha was an actor of the Kobylianska Music and Drama Theater in Chernivtsi. Since 1999 he is a director of the Zibrov's Song Theater as well as an actor, playwright and director of several concerts in the Palace of Arts "Ukrayina". Maha wrote number of songs for several Russian and Ukrainian singers such as Iryna Bilyk, Larisa Dolina, Iosif Kobzon, Taisia Povaliy, and many others. He also wrote a drama play "Danube Cossack beyond the rapids" for the Beniuk-Khostikoyev Theatric Company.

In 1999-2007 Maha hosted a show "Telefortuna" at the Pershyi Natsionalnyi (state central channel).

Since 2008 he is co-presenter of the Shuster LIVE show along with Savik Shuster.
