= Sliepkovce =

Village and municipality in Slovakia

Sliepkovce Dénesújfalu
- Municipality
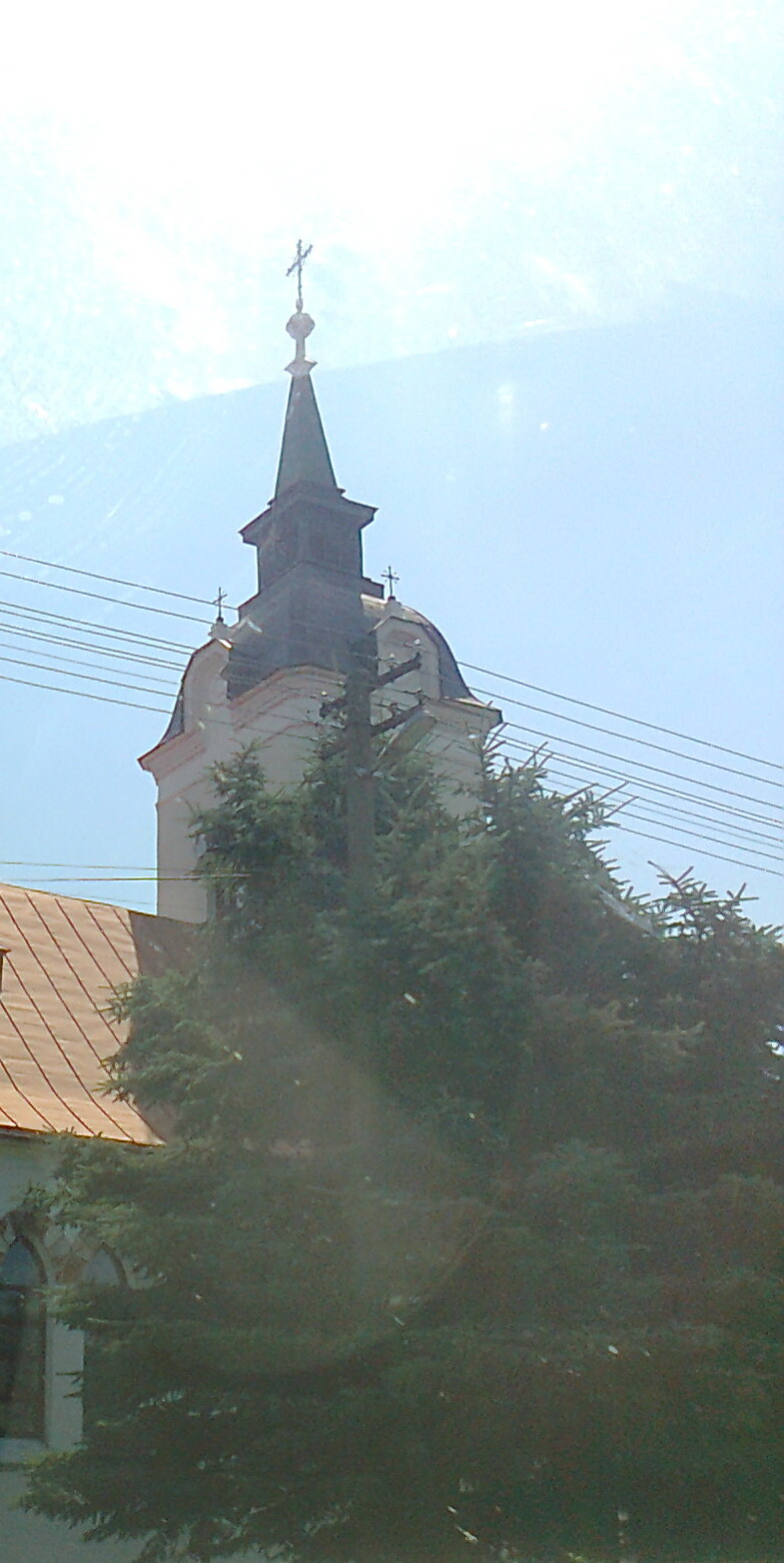

- Flag

- Location of Sliepkovce in the Košice Region Location of Sliepkovce in Slovakia
- Coordinates: 48.67°N 21.95°E
- Country: Slovakia
- Region: Košice Region
- District: Michalovce District
- First mentioned: 1345

Area
  - Total: 6.45 km^{2} (2.49 sq mi)
- Elevation: 105 m (344 ft)

Population (2025)
  - Total: 760
- Time zone: UTC+1 (CET)
  - Summer (DST): UTC+2 (CEST)
- Postal code: 723 7
- Area code: +421 56
- Vehicle registration plate (until 2022): MI
- Website: www.obecsliepkovce.sk

Sliepkovce (Slovak pronunciation: [ˈslɪepkɔwtse], Hungarian: Dénesújfalu) is a village and municipality in Michalovce District in the Kosice Region of eastern Slovakia.

== History ==
In historical records the village was first mentioned in 1345.

The original village lay several kilometres to the south of its current location, closer to the neighbouring village of Budkovce. Due to marshy conditions and frequent flooding in the original location, in the 1890s, the village was reestablished at a new location several kilometres to the north (its current location) and the original village was demolished. The efforts were financed and supported by Dénes Andrássy of the Andrássy family from Krásna Hôrka. The colloquial Hungarian name of the current village of Sliepkovce is Dénesújfalu ("Dennis-new-ville"), apparently adopted in honour of Andrássy's support for the 1890s project. This newer name has also become common in the Zemplín dialect of Slovak, as Deneš.

== Geography ==
The municipality lies at an altitude of 105 metres (344 ft) and covers an area of 6.45 km^{2} (2.49 sq mi) (2025).

== Population ==
Population statistic (10 years)
Year	1995	2005	2015	2025
Count	712	717	751	760
Difference		+0.70%	+4.74%	+1.19%

Population statistic
Year	2024	2025
Count	771	760
Difference		−1.42%

It has a population of 760 people (31 December 2025).

=== Ethnicity ===
Census 2021 (1+ %)
Ethnicity	Number	Fraction
Slovak	739	97.23%
Romani	34	4.47%
Not found out	14	1.84%
Total	760	

In year 2021 was 760 people by ethnicity 739 as Slovak, 34 as Romani, 14 as Not found out, 5 as Czech, 3 as Ukrainian, 3 as Rusyn, 3 as Hungarian and 2 as English.

Note on population: The difference values of population numbers in the table "Population statistic" and in the sections "Ethnicity" & "Religion" is caused by the use of various statistical methods.

=== Religion ===
Census 2021 (1+ %)
Religion	Number	Fraction
Roman Catholic Church	566	74.47%
Greek Catholic Church	106	13.95%
None	34	4.47%
Christian Congregations in Slovakia	13	1.71%
Eastern Orthodox Church	12	1.58%
Calvinist Church	11	1.45%
Not found out	10	1.32%
Total	760	

In year 2021 was 760 people by religion 566 from Roman Catholic Church, 106 from Greek Catholic Church, 34 from None, 13 from Christian Congregations in Slovakia, 12 from Eastern Orthodox Church, 11 from Calvinist Church, 10 from Not found out, 2 from United Methodist Church, 1 from Jehovah's Witnesses, 1 from Other, 1 from Evangelical Church, 1 from Seventh-day Adventist Church, 1 from Church of Jesus Christ of Latter-day Saints and 1 from Apostolic Church.

== Culture ==
The village has a small public library, and a football pitch, built in 1946.

== Transport ==
The village has three bus stops on its main street and is serviced by regular bus lines between Michalovce and Budkovce.

The nearest railway station is 6 kilometres away at Budkovce.

== See also ==
- List of municipalities and towns in Michalovce District
- List of municipalities and towns in Slovakia
