= Chop–Tysa =

Land border crossing between Ukraine and Hungary

Cho –Tysa

Locaiton
- Country: Ukraine
- Location: Solomonovo, Uzhhorod Raion, Zakarpattia Oblast
- Coordinates: 48.418431°N 22.170222°E

For the city, see Chop, Ukraine.

Chop–Tysa is a land border crossing between Ukraine and Hungary on the Ukrainian side, near the village of Solomonovo, Uzhhorod Raion, Zakarpattia Oblast.

The crossing is situated on Highway M06. Across the border on the Hungarian side is the town of Zahony, Szabolcs-Szatmár-Bereg County, Northern Great Plain.

The type of crossing is automobile. The types of transportation for automobile crossings are passenger and freight. Pedestrian and bicycle movement is closed.

The port of entry is part of the Tysa customs post of Chop customs.

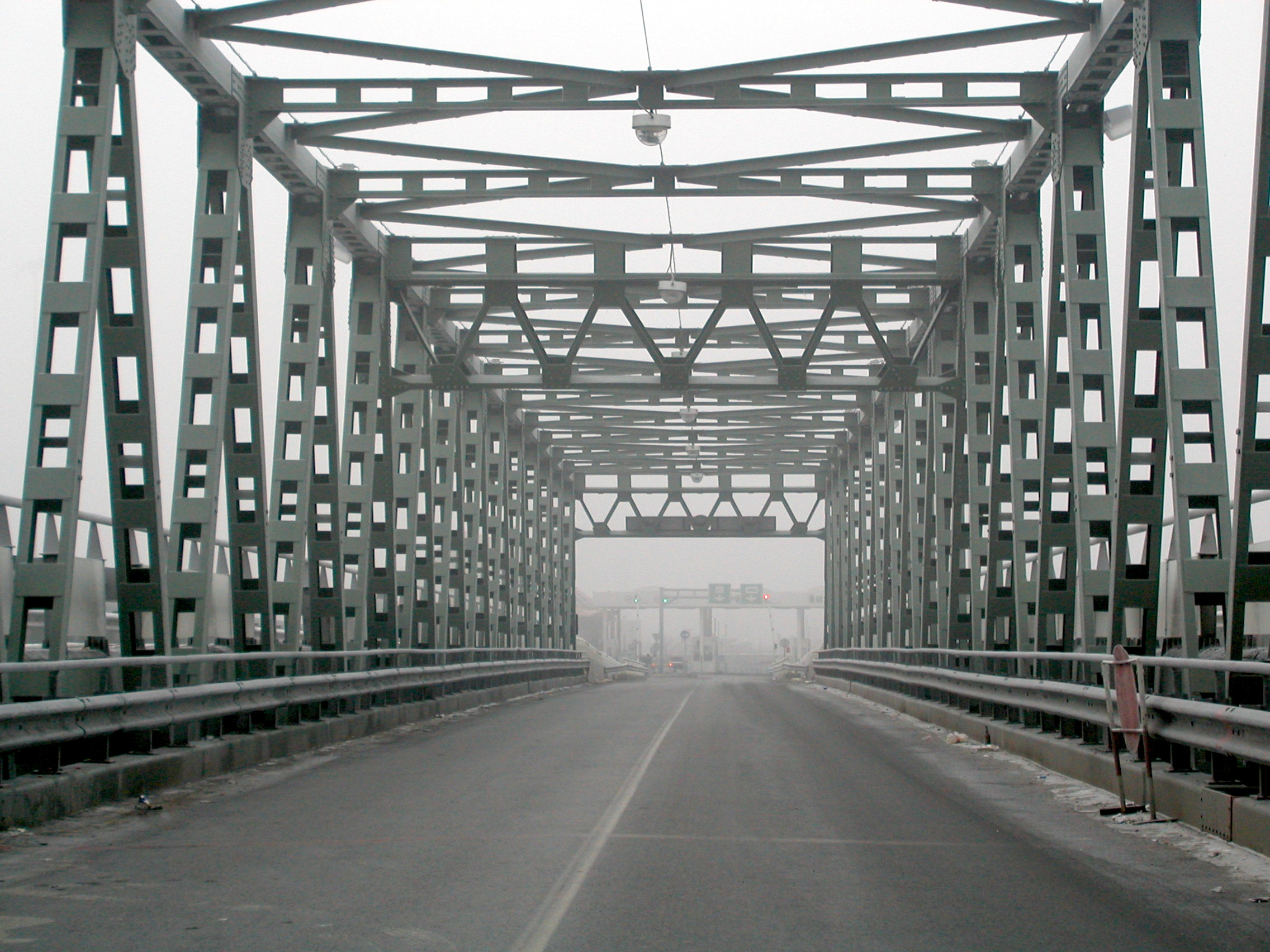
Bridge over Tysa viewing the Hungarian side

== See also ==
- State Border of Ukraine
