= Rannia Zoria =

Rannia Zoria Рання Зоря Ранняя Заря
- Village
- Location of Rannia Zoria Rannia Zoria (Ukraine)
- Coordinates: 49°15′33″N 40°11′53″E
- Country: Ukraine
- Oblast: Luhansk Oblast
- Raion: Starobilsk Raion
- Founded: 1920

Area
  - Total: 0.84 km^{2} (0.32 sq mi)
- Elevation: 173 m (568 ft)

Population (2001 census)
  - Total: 106
  - Density: 130/km^{2} (330/sq mi)
- Time zone: UTC+2 (EET)
  - Summer (DST): UTC+3 (EEST)
- Postal code: 92543
- Area code: +380 6465

Rannia Zoria (Ukrainian: Рання Зоря), literally Early Sunrise, originally Berezova-Yarsk then from 1928 until 2016 called Chervona Zirka, is a village in Starobilsk Raion (district) in Luhansk Oblast of eastern Ukraine.

It is the most eastern Ukrainian municipality. The distance to the most western village Solomonovo in the Zakarpattia Oblast is 1,500 km (930 mi).

== Demographics ==
Native language as of the Ukrainian Census of 2001:

- Ukrainian 66.98%
- Russian 19.81%
- Other 13.21%
