= Chop railway station =

Railway station in Ukraine

Chop Чоп
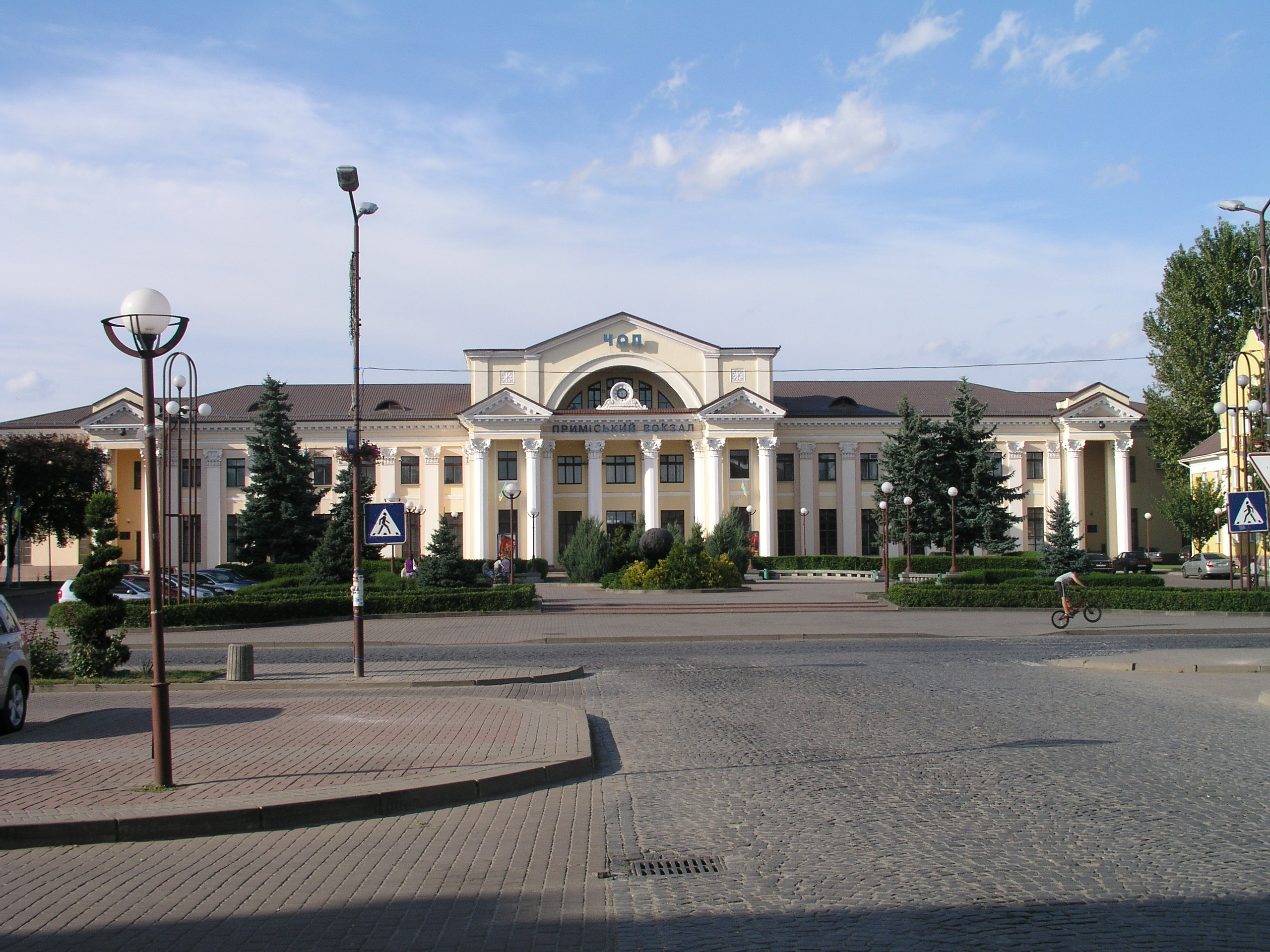

General information
- Location: Rail Station Square, Chop (Pryvokzalna ploshcha); Zakarpattia Oblast; Ukraine
- Coordinates: 48°25′58.1″N 22°12′26.7″E
- System: Inter-city rail
- Owner: Ukrzaliznytsia
- Operator: Lviv Railways
- Platforms: 2
- Tracks: 11

History
- Opened: 4 December 1872

Services
Preceding station	Ukrainian Railways	Following station
Chop Perevalochna Baza	Lviv Railways	Čierna nad Tisou (Slovakia)
Dachne	Lviv Railways	Záhony (Hungary)
Preceding station	ÖBB	Following station
Mukachevo towards Kyiv	Schnellzug	Záhony towards Wien Hbf
Location

Chop (Ukrainian: Чоп, Hungarian: Csap) is a railway station that is located in the small city of Chop, Zakarpattia Oblast in Ukraine. It is part of the Uzhhorod administration (Lviv Railways).

== General description ==
The station is an important transportation hub and gateway to Ukraine, as most railways in its neighbouring countries have 1435mm standard gauge, whereas most of Ukraine has 1520mm broad gauge tracks. There are two border checkpoints: Strazh for Slovakia and Druzhba for Hungary. The station serves passengers and freight trains. Among the services provided at the station is only for passengers getting on or off commuter and regional trains.

== Locomotive depot ==
The station also contains a locomotive depot that services locomotives. Currently there are no locomotive units assigned to the depot and all M62, ChME3, and D1 multiple units were transferred either to Mukacheve or Koroleve locomotive depots.

== Connections ==
Standard gauge line to Čierna nad Tisou railway station in Slovakia with through connections to Prague in the Czech Republic.

Standard gauge line to Mukachevo.

Standard gauge to Záhony, Hungary.

== Gallery ==
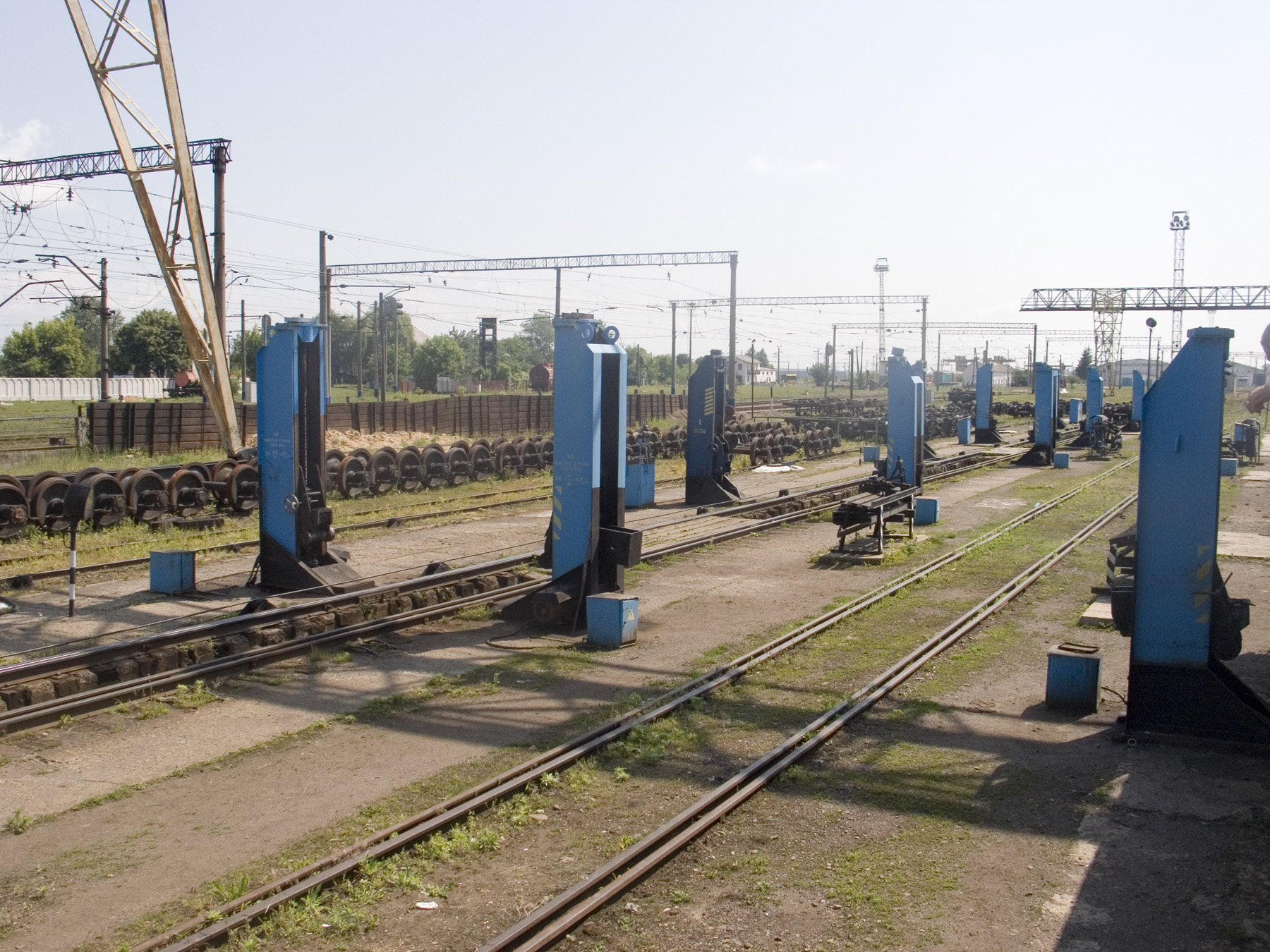
Bogie exchange station for track gauge transition

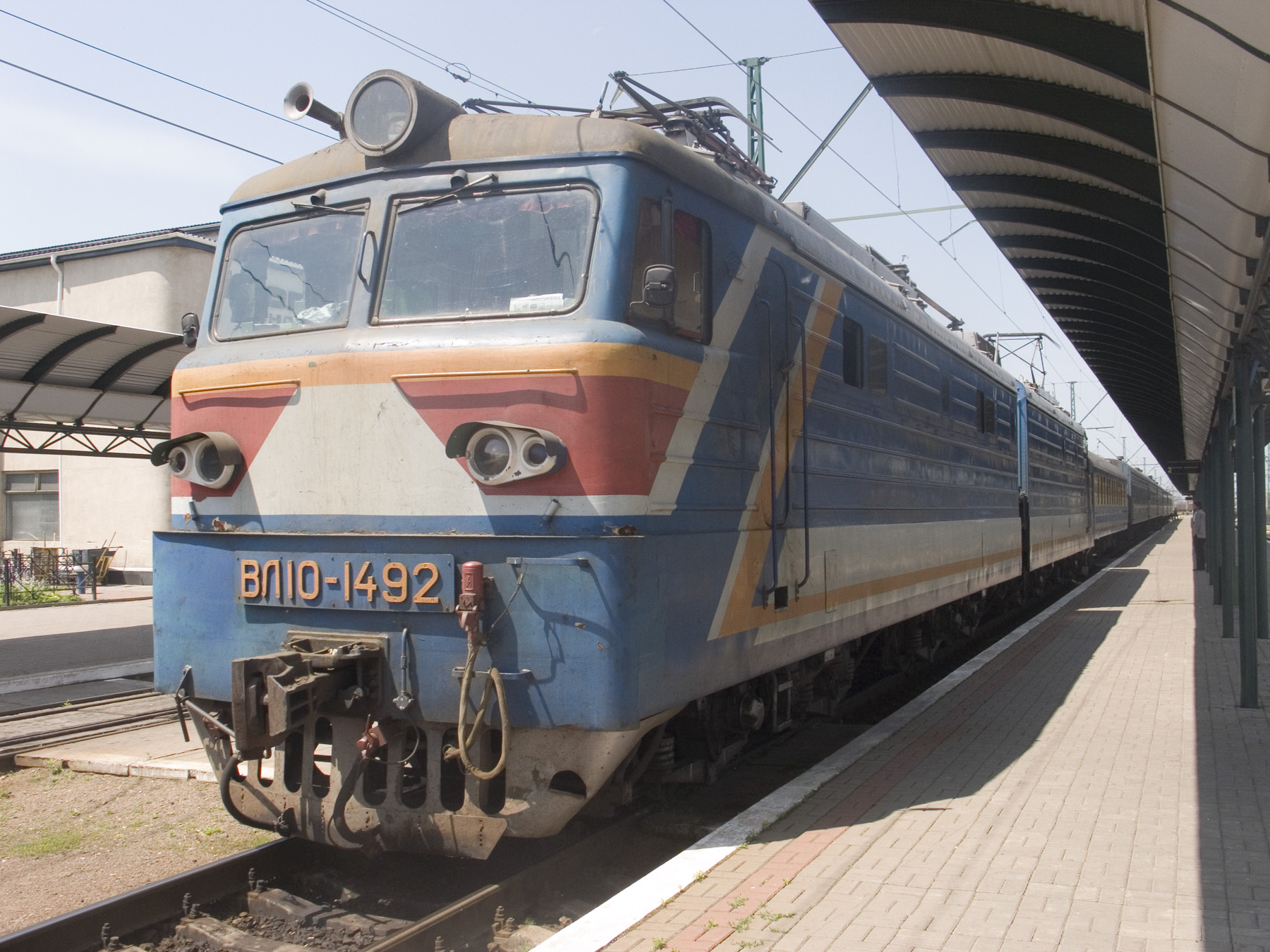
Electric locomotive (VL10) at the station
