= Čierna nad Tisou railway station =

Railway station in Košice Region, Slovakia

Čierna nad Tisou
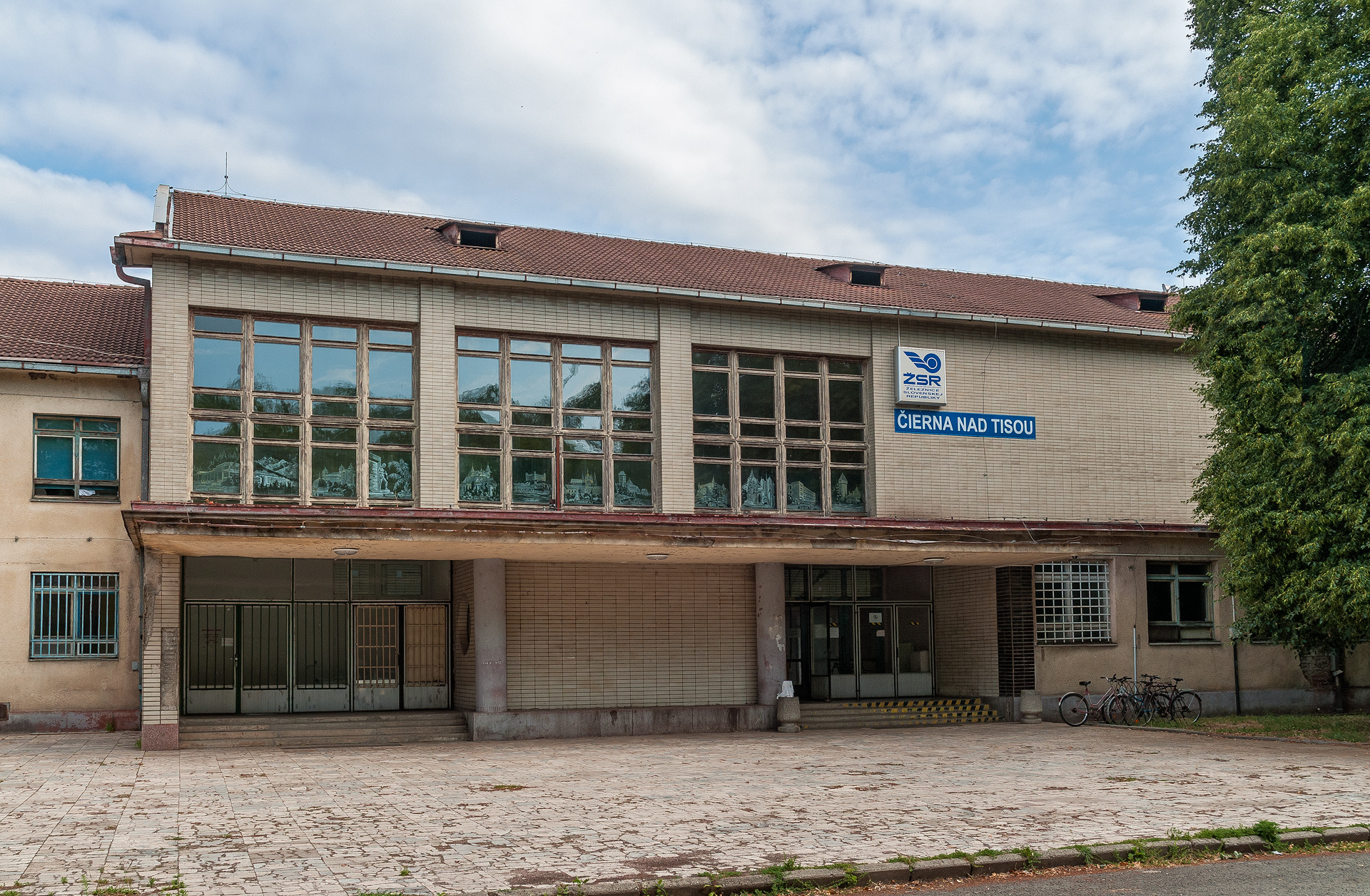
- Čierna nad Tisou railway station

General information
- Location: Čierna nad Tisou, Košice Region, Slovakia
- Coordinates: 48°25′10″N 22°05′12″E
- Line: 190
- Platforms: 3
- Tracks: 916

History
- Opened: 1872
Location

Čierna nad Tisou railway station (Slovak: Železničná stanica Čierna nad Tisou) is an important border railway station in the town of Čierna nad Tisou, Košice Region, Slovakia. It is close to the border with Ukraine and, as the railways have two different gauges, all trains have to change gauge here: the railway has 916 tracks and is the biggest 'harbour on land' in Central Europe. The first station across the border is Chop. The station is on the Pan-European Corridor VA from Venice in Italy to Kyiv in Ukraine via Bratislava, Žilina, Košice and Uzhhorod.

== Train services ==
The station is served by the following trains:

- Osobný vlak (local stopping service) Košice - Čierna nad Tisou
- RegionalExpress Košice - Čierna nad Tisou
- Osobný vlak (local stopping service) Čierna nad Tisou - Chop

| Preceding station | ŽSSK | Following station |
|---|---|---|
| Čierna nad Tisou zastávka toward Košice | Stopping trains | Terminus |
| Terminus | Stopping trains | Chop (Ukraine); Terminus |

== See also ==
- Uzhhorod–Košice broad-gauge track, a Russian-gauge line from Ukraine into Slovakia
