= Čierna nad Tisou =

Čierna nad Tisou Tiszacsernyő
- Municipality
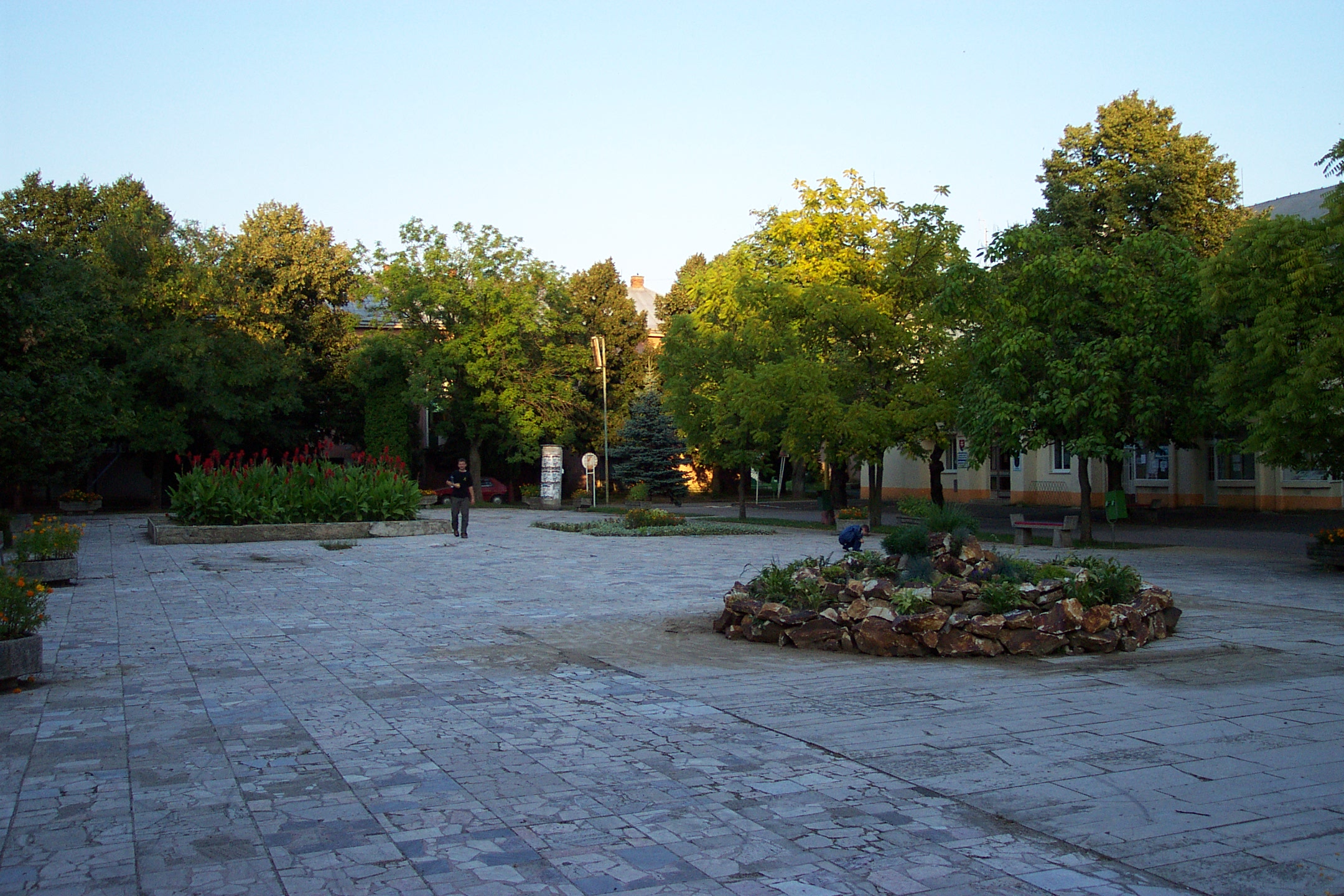
- Pionierov Square

- Flag Coat of arms

- Location of Čierna nad Tisou in the Košice Region Location of Čierna nad Tisou in Slovakia
- Coordinates: 48.42°N 22.10°E
- Country: Slovakia
- Region: Košice Region
- District: Trebišov District
- First mentioned: 1828

Government
  - Mayor: Viktor Palko (2022–)

Area
  - Total: 9.37 km^{2} (3.62 sq mi)
- Elevation: 110 m (360 ft)

Population (2025)
  - Total: 3,343
- Time zone: UTC+1 (CET)
  - Summer (DST): UTC+2 (CEST)
- Postal code: 764 3
- Area code: +421 56
- Vehicle registration plate (until 2022): TV
- Website: www.ciernanadtisou.sk

Čierna nad Tisou (Hungarian: Tiszacsernyő) is a town and municipality in the Trebišov District in the Košice Region of extreme south-eastern Slovakia, near the Tisza river.

== History ==
The town and municipality is one of the newest in the Košice Region established in 1828.

In 1968, from 29 July to 1 August, Soviet and Czechoslovak leaders Leonid Brezhnev and Alexander Dubček met in Čierna nad Tisou. This meeting was followed by the Warsaw Pact invasion of Czechoslovakia on 20 August 1968.

== Geography ==
The municipality lies at an altitude of 110 metres (360 ft) and covers an area of 9.37 km^{2} (3.62 sq mi) (2025). It is close to the tripoint between Hungary, Ukraine and Slovakia.

== Population ==
Historical population
Year	Pop.	±%
1970	2,238	—
1980	3,801	+69.8%
1991	4,744	+24.8%
2001	4,645	−2.1%
2011	3,885	−16.4%
2021	3,586	−7.7%
Source: Censuses

Population statistic (10 years)
Year	1995	2005	2015	2025
Count	5087	4299	3669	3343
Difference		−15.49%	−14.65%	−8.88%

Population statistic
Year	2024	2025
Count	3367	3343
Difference		−0.71%

It has a population of 3343 people (31 December 2025).

Due to the decline of railway traffic, the population size has decreased considerable in the first decades of the 21st century. From the peak of about 5,000 inhabitants in mid-1990s, the population of Čierna nad Tisou decreased to about 3,400 in 2025, representing the fastest decline of town population over that period in Slovakia.

=== Ethnicity ===
Census 2021 (1+%)
Ethnicity	Number	Fraction
Hungarian	1996	55.66%
Slovak	1441	40.18%
Not found out	374	10.42%
Total	3586	

In year 2021 was 3586 people by ethnicity 1996 as Hungarian, 1441 as Slovak, 374 as Not found out, 22 as Romani, 15 as Ukrainian, 11 as Rusyn, 10 as Czech, 8 as Albanian, 6 as Vietnamese, 2 as Russian, 2 as Other, 1 as Italian, 1 as Croatian and 1 as English.

Note on population: The difference values of population numbers in the table "Population statistic" and in the sections "Ethnicity" & "Religion" is caused by the use of various statistical methods.

=== Religion ===
Census 2021 (1+%)
Religion	Number	Fraction
Roman Catholic Church	1174	32.74%
None	765	21.33%
Not found out	541	15.09%
Calvinist Church	474	13.22%
Greek Catholic Church	445	12.41%
Jehovah's Witnesses	89	2.48%
Evangelical Church	59	1.65%
Total	3586	

In year 2021 was 3586 people by religion 1174 from Roman Catholic Church, 765 from None, 541 from Not found out, 474 from Calvinist Church, 445 from Greek Catholic Church, 89 from Jehovah's Witnesses, 59 from Evangelical Church, 16 from Eastern Orthodox Church, 10 from Islam, 4 from Other and not ascertained christian church, 2 from Christian Congregations in Slovakia, 2 from Other, 2 from United Methodist Church, 1 from Jewish community, 1 from Old Catholic Church and 1 from Apostolic Church.

== Economy and facilities ==
The town has a pharmacy, and outpatient health facilities of a general practitioner for children and adolescents. The town has a public library, gymnasium, a post office, and a number of general and food stores.

== Transport ==
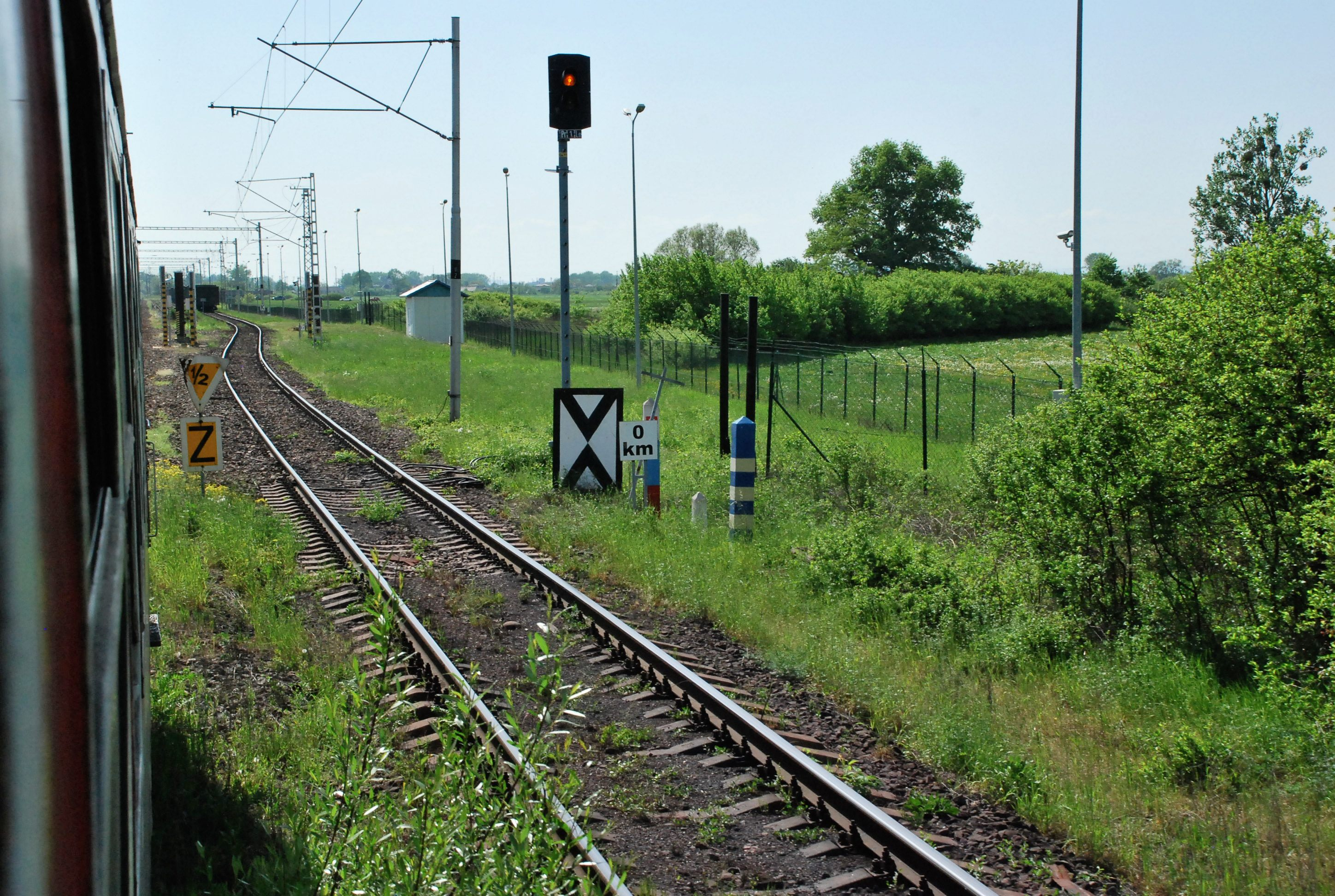
Railway border crossing

The town has a railway border crossing to Ukraine, where all trains have to change gauge. With 916 tracks this town is the biggest "harbour on land" in Central Europe. The first town across the border in Ukraine is Chop.

== Twin towns – sister cities ==
Čierna nad Tisou is twinned with:

- Chop, Ukraine

== See also ==
- List of municipalities and towns in Slovakia

== Genealogical resources ==
The records for genealogical research are available at the state archive "Statny Archiv in Kosice, Slovakia"

- Roman Catholic church records (births/marriages/deaths): 1719-1922 (parish B)
- Greek Catholic church records (births/marriages/deaths): 1795-1905 (parish B)
- Reformated church records (births/marriages/deaths): 1772-1889 (parish B)
