= Záhony =

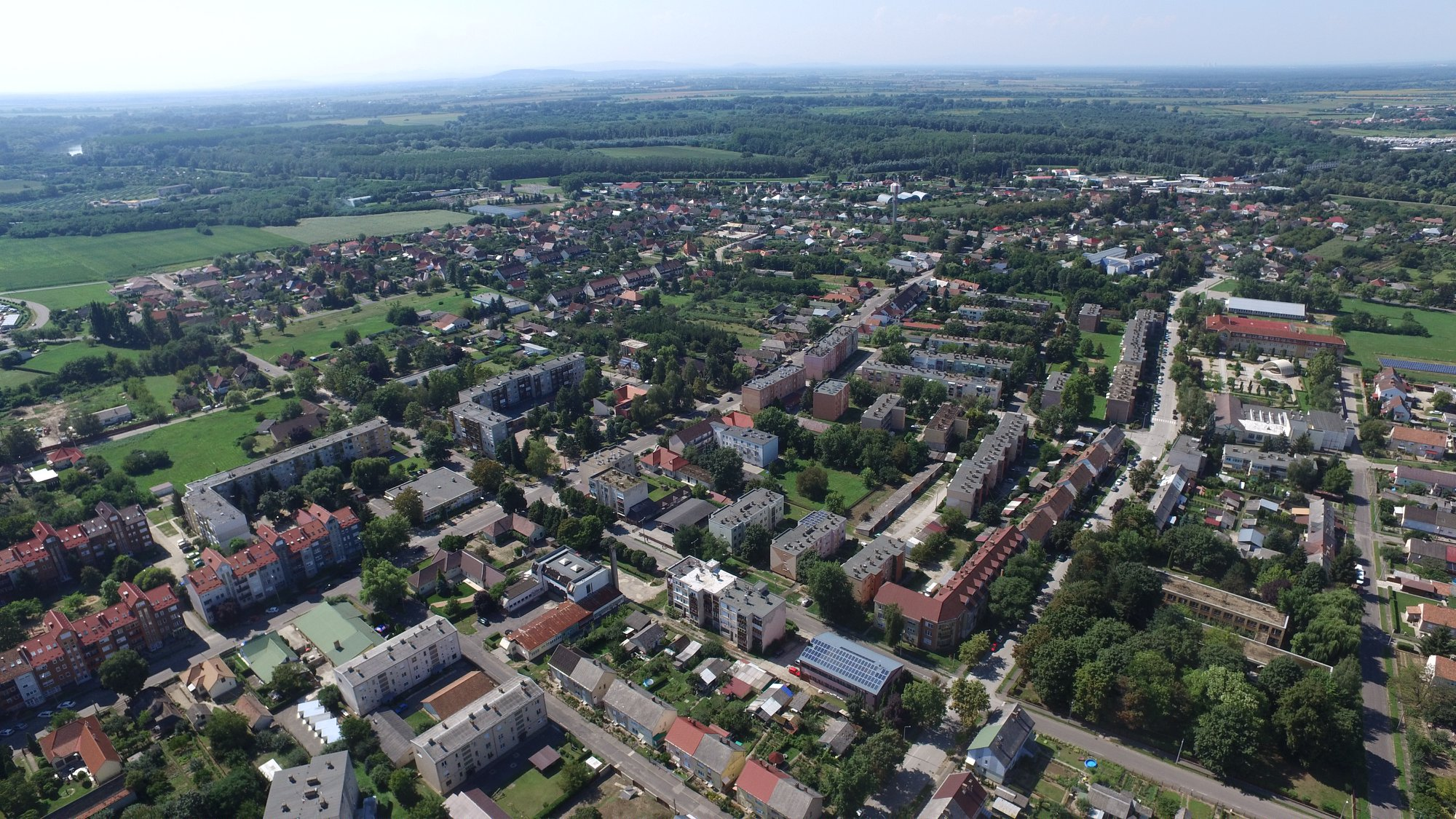

- Flag Coat of arms

- Location of Záhony Záhony (Hungary)
- Coordinates: 48.417°N 22.183°E
- Country: Hungary
- County: Szabolcs-Szatmár-Bereg

Area
  - Total: 6.87 km^{2} (2.65 sq mi)

Population (2015)
  - Total: 4,156
  - Density: 605/km^{2} (1,570/sq mi)
- Time zone: UTC+1 (CET)
  - Summer (DST): UTC+2 (CEST)
- Postal code: 4625
- Area code: 45
- Website: www.zahony.hu

Záhony (Ukrainian: Загонь) is a town in Szabolcs-Szatmár-Bereg county, Northern Great Plain, eastern Hungary.

Its town council covers 6.97 km^{2} (3 sq mi) and has a population of 4675 people (2005). A point on the median line of major river the Tisza 300 metres west of the town is an international tripoint, shared with outlying Chop (contiguous with Solomonovo), Ukraine and locally unconnected Malé Trakany, Slovakia. A major road and railway connects Ukraine, with border crossing controls being a gateway to the Schengen Zone.

Záhony was a town in Ung county (abolished and apportioned to three countries in the Treaty of Trianon signed at Versailles in 1920).

== Climate ==
Záhony's climate is classified as humid continental climate (Köppen Dfb). The annual average temperature is 10.5 °C (50.9 °F), the hottest month in July is 21.5 °C (70.7 °F), and the coldest month is −1.5 °C (29.3 °F) in January. The annual precipitation is 636.5 millimetres (25.06 in), of which July is the wettest with 74.6 millimetres (2.94 in), while January is the driest with only 37.1 millimetres (1.46 in). The extreme temperature throughout the year ranged from −20.8 °C (−5.4 °F) on February 7, 2005 to 38.0 °C (100.4 °F) on July 20, 2007.

Climate data for Záhony, 1991−2020 normals
Month	Jan	Feb	Mar	Apr	May	Jun	Jul	Aug	Sep	Oct	Nov	Dec	Year
Record high °C (°F)	12.4 (54.3)	18.6 (65.5)	24.2 (75.6)	31.2 (88.2)	33.4 (92.1)	35.8 (96.4)	38.0 (100.4)	37.5 (99.5)	36.1 (97.0)	27.0 (80.6)	23.2 (73.8)	16.1 (61.0)	38.0 (100.4)
Mean daily maximum °C (°F)	1.4 (34.5)	4.3 (39.7)	10.6 (51.1)	17.8 (64.0)	22.7 (72.9)	26.1 (79.0)	28.0 (82.4)	28.1 (82.6)	22.3 (72.1)	15.9 (60.6)	9.1 (48.4)	2.6 (36.7)	15.7 (60.3)
Daily mean °C (°F)	−1.5 (29.3)	0.4 (32.7)	5.3 (41.5)	11.5 (52.7)	16.4 (61.5)	19.9 (67.8)	21.5 (70.7)	21.2 (70.2)	15.9 (60.6)	10.1 (50.2)	4.9 (40.8)	−0.1 (31.8)	10.5 (50.9)
Mean daily minimum °C (°F)	−4.1 (24.6)	−3.0 (26.6)	0.8 (33.4)	5.8 (42.4)	10.6 (51.1)	14.3 (57.7)	15.6 (60.1)	15.4 (59.7)	10.8 (51.4)	5.8 (42.4)	1.6 (34.9)	−2.4 (27.7)	5.9 (42.6)
Record low °C (°F)	−20.5 (−4.9)	−20.8 (−5.4)	−14.1 (6.6)	−6.7 (19.9)	−1.2 (29.8)	6.0 (42.8)	7.2 (45.0)	6.9 (44.4)	−0.1 (31.8)	−7.8 (18.0)	−11.8 (10.8)	−20.1 (−4.2)	−20.8 (−5.4)
Average precipitation mm (inches)	37.1 (1.46)	44.7 (1.76)	36.7 (1.44)	41.7 (1.64)	67.1 (2.64)	68.6 (2.70)	74.6 (2.94)	53.7 (2.11)	58.9 (2.32)	51.0 (2.01)	48.2 (1.90)	54.2 (2.13)	636.5 (25.06)
Average precipitation days (≥ 1.0 mm)	8.4	8.8	7.1	6.7	9.1	8.7	9.0	6.6	7.5	7.0	8.0	9.3	96.2
Average relative humidity (%)	84.1	78.0	67.9	61.4	66.3	67.7	68.1	67.9	73.3	79.5	83.8	84.9	73.6
Source: NOAA

== Twin towns – sister cities ==
Záhony is twinned with:

- Chop, Ukraine

== Gallery ==
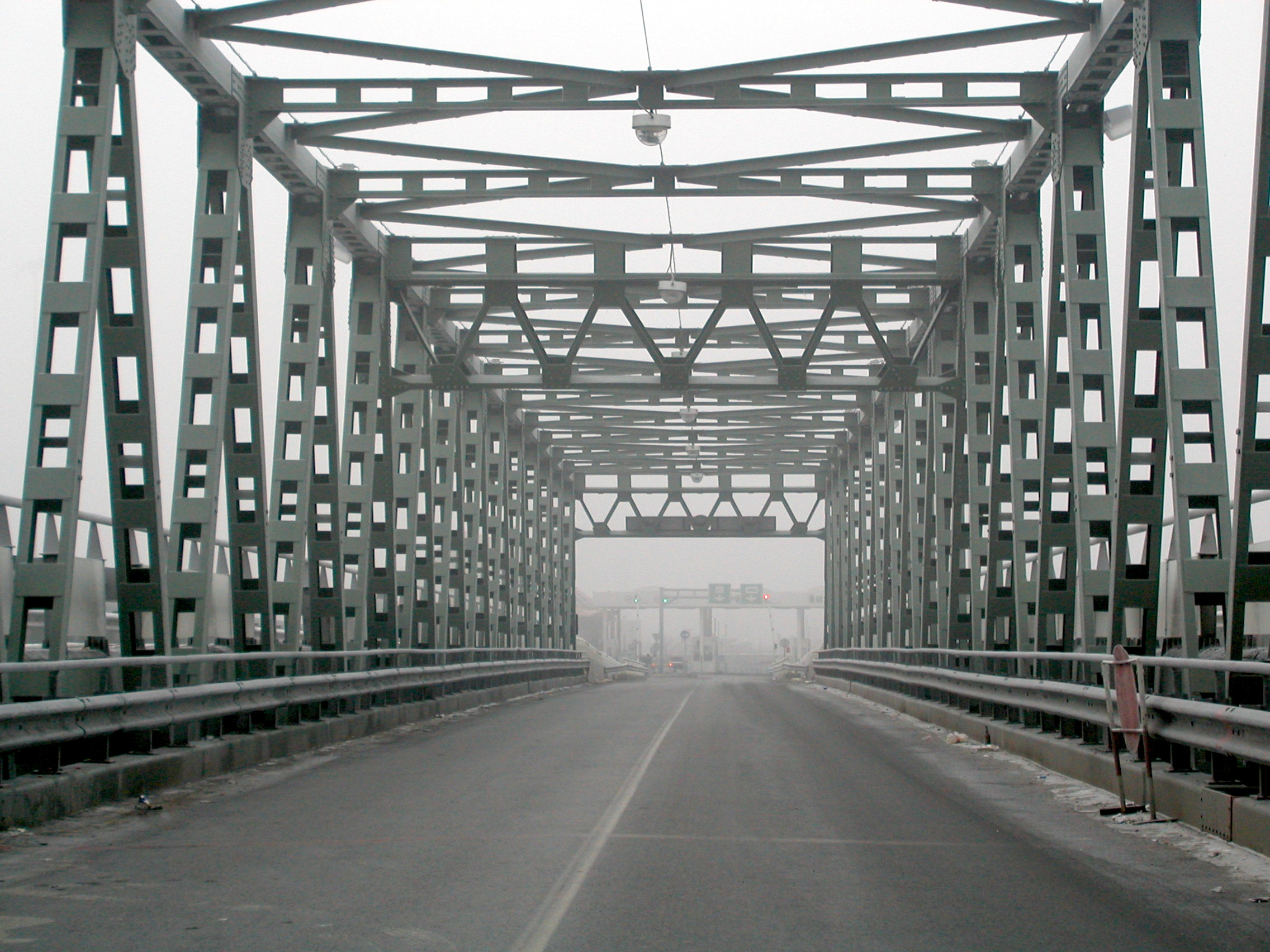
The Tisza bridge at the Chop-Záhony checkpoint (view from the Ukrainian side).

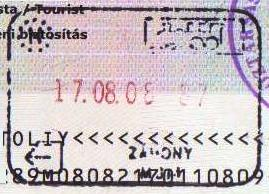
Passport stamp from Záhony.
