= Dobrá, Trebišov District =

Village and municipality in Slovakia

Dobrá Kisdobra
- Municipality
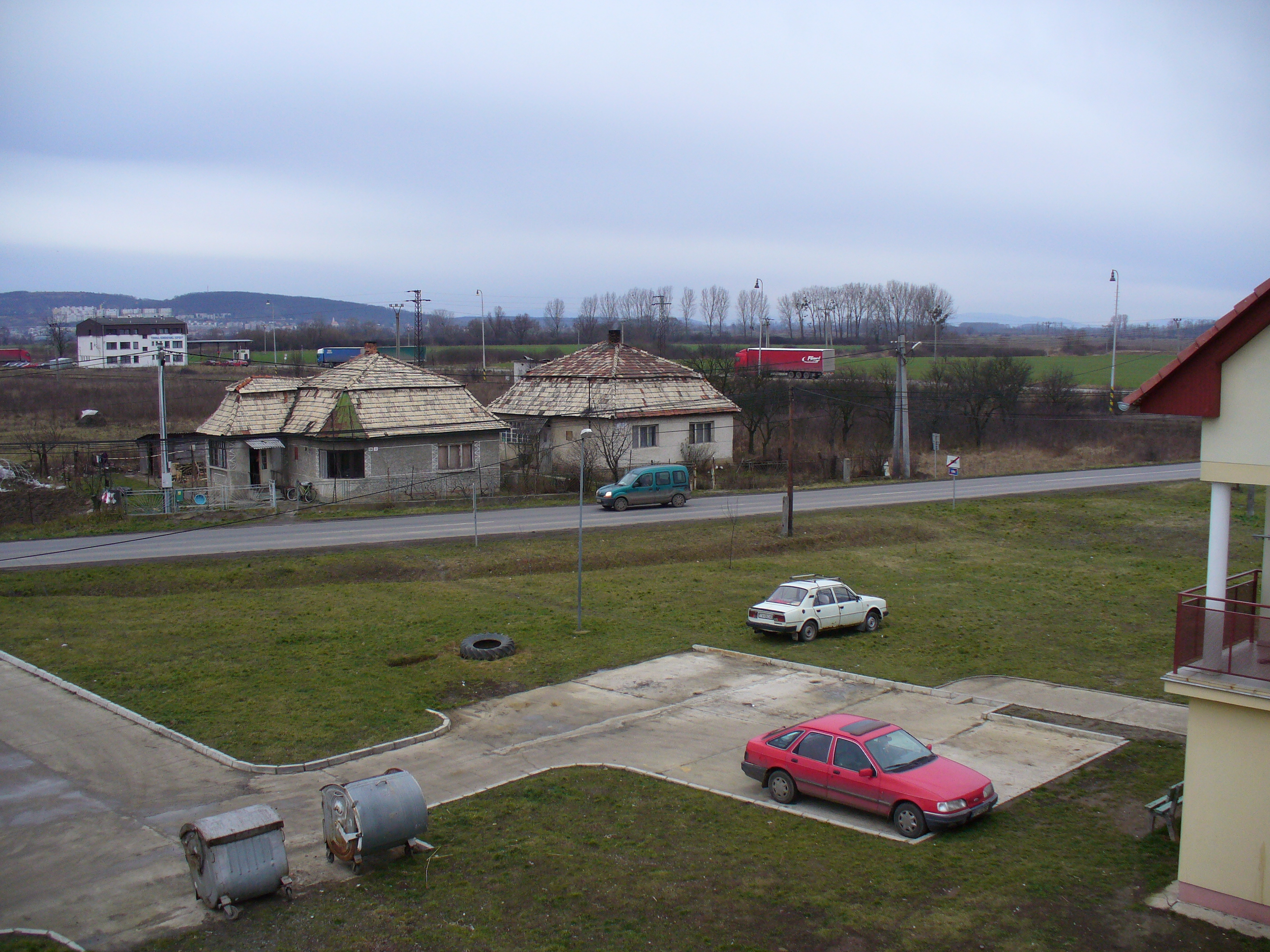

- Flag

- Location of Dobrá in the Košice Region Location of Dobrá in Slovakia
- Coordinates: 48.41°N 22.03°E
- Country: Slovakia
- Region: Košice Region
- District: Trebišov District
- First mentioned: 1323

Area
  - Total: 8.32 km^{2} (3.21 sq mi)
- Elevation: 100 m (330 ft)

Population (2025)
  - Total: 505
- Time zone: UTC+1 (CET)
  - Summer (DST): UTC+2 (CEST)
- Postal code: 764 1
- Area code: +421 56
- Vehicle registration plate (until 2022): TV
- Website: www.obecdobra.sk

Dobrá (Hungarian: Kisdobra) is a village and municipality in the Trebišov District in the Košice Region of eastern Slovakia.

== History ==
In historical records the village was first mentioned in 1323.

== Geography ==
The municipality lies at an altitude of 100 metres (330 ft) and covers an area of 8.32 km^{2} (3.21 sq mi) (2025).

== Population ==
Population statistic (10 years)
Year	1995	2005	2015	2025
Count	337	422	492	505
Difference		+25.22%	+16.58%	+2.64%

Population statistic
Year	2024	2025
Count	505	505
Difference		+0%

It has a population of 505 people (31 December 2025).

=== Ethnicity ===
Census 2021 (1+ %)
Ethnicity	Number	Fraction
Hungarian	341	69.87%
Slovak	152	31.14%
Romani	18	3.68%
Not found out	18	3.68%
Total	488	

In year 2021 was 488 people by ethnicity 341 as Hungarian, 152 as Slovak, 18 as Romani, 18 as Not found out, 1 as Czech and 1 as Rusyn.

Note on population: The difference values of population numbers in the table "Population statistic" and in the sections "Ethnicity" & "Religion" is caused by the use of various statistical methods.

=== Religion ===
Census 2021 (1+ %)
Religion	Number	Fraction
Greek Catholic Church	248	50.82%
None	94	19.26%
Roman Catholic Church	87	17.83%
Calvinist Church	38	7.79%
Not found out	13	2.66%
Jehovah's Witnesses	6	1.23%
Total	488	

In year 2021 was 488 people by religion 248 from Greek Catholic Church, 94 from None, 87 from Roman Catholic Church, 38 from Calvinist Church, 13 from Not found out, 6 from Jehovah's Witnesses, 1 from Eastern Orthodox Church and 1 from Evangelical Church.

== Facilities ==
The village has a public library and a football pitch.

== Genealogical resources ==
The records for genealogical research are available at the state archive "Statny Archiv in Kosice, Slovakia"

- Roman Catholic church records (births/marriages/deaths): 1848-1904 (parish B)
- Greek Catholic church records (births/marriages/deaths): 1795-1905 (parish A)

== See also ==
- List of municipalities and towns in Slovakia
