= Budkovce =

Village and municipality in Slovakia

Budkovce Butka
- Municipality
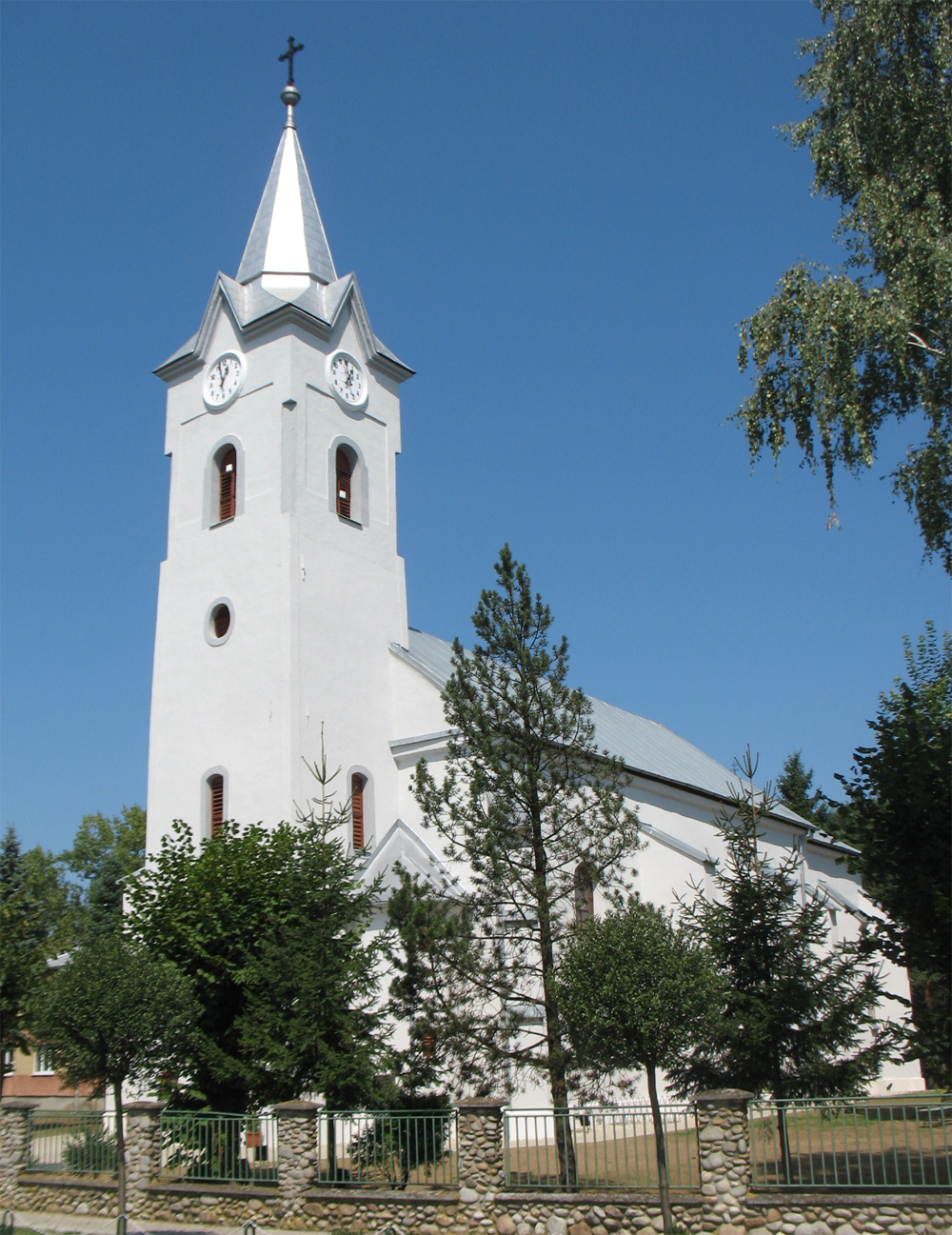

- Flag Coat of arms

- Location of Budkovce in the Košice Region Location of Budkovce in Slovakia
- Coordinates: 48.63°N 21.93°E
- Country: Slovakia
- Region: Košice Region
- District: Michalovce District
- First mentioned: 1319

Area
  - Total: 19.84 km^{2} (7.66 sq mi)
- Elevation: 102 m (335 ft)

Population (2025)
  - Total: 1,490
- Time zone: UTC+1 (CET)
  - Summer (DST): UTC+2 (CEST)
- Postal code: 721 5
- Area code: +421 56
- Vehicle registration plate (until 2022): MI
- Website: budkovce.sk

Budkovce (Hungarian: Butka [ˈbutkɒ]) a village and municipality in Michalovce District in the Kosice Region of eastern Slovakia.

== History ==
In historical records the village was first mentioned in 1319. Before the establishment of independent Czechoslovakia in 1918, it was part of Zemplén County within the Kingdom of Hungary.

== Geography ==
The village lies at an altitude of 102 metres and covers an area of 75.07 km^{2} (28.98 sq mi) (2025).

== Population ==
Population statistic (10 years)
Year	1995	2005	2015	2025
Count	1548	1494	1514	1490
Difference		−3.48%	+1.33%	−1.58%

Population statistic
Year	2024	2025
Count	1505	1490
Difference		−0.99%

It has a population of 1490 people (31 December 2025).

=== Ethnicity ===
Census 2021 (1+ %)
Ethnicity	Number	Fraction
Slovak	1432	95.59%
Not found out	36	2.4%
Hungarian	15	1%
Total	1498	

In year 2021 was 1498 people by ethnicity 1432 as Slovak, 36 as Not found out, 15 as Hungarian, 11 as Romani, 9 as Czech, 6 as Ukrainian, 4 as Russian, 3 as Polish, 3 as Other, 2 as Rusyn and 1 as German.

Note on population: The difference values of population numbers in the table "Population statistic" and in the sections "Ethnicity" & "Religion" is caused by the use of various statistical methods.

=== Religion ===
Census 2021 (1+ %)
Religion	Number	Fraction
Roman Catholic Church	953	63.62%
None	227	15.15%
Greek Catholic Church	186	12.42%
Eastern Orthodox Church	37	2.47%
Not found out	33	2.2%
Calvinist Church	19	1.27%
Evangelical Church	17	1.13%
Total	1498	

In year 2021 was 1498 people by religion 953 from Roman Catholic Church, 227 from None, 186 from Greek Catholic Church, 37 from Eastern Orthodox Church, 33 from Not found out, 19 from Calvinist Church, 17 from Evangelical Church, 9 from Jehovah's Witnesses, 9 from Christian Congregations in Slovakia, 5 from Ad hoc movements, 1 from Paganism and natural spirituality, 1 from Other and not ascertained christian church and 1 from Czechoslovak Hussite Church.

== Government ==
The village relies on the tax and district offices, police force and fire brigade at Michalovce although the village has its own birth registry.

== Economy ==
The village has a post office, a Slovak bank and insurance company and a number of food stores.

== Sports ==
The village has a football pitch and a gymnasium.

== Genealogical resources ==
The records for genealogical research are available at the state archive "Statny Archiv in Kosice, Presov, Slovakia"

- Roman Catholic church records (births/marriages/deaths): 1850-1895 (parish A)
- Greek Catholic church records (births/marriages/deaths): 1756-1904 (parish B)
- Reformed church records (births/marriages/deaths): 1793-1938 (parish B)

== Gallery ==
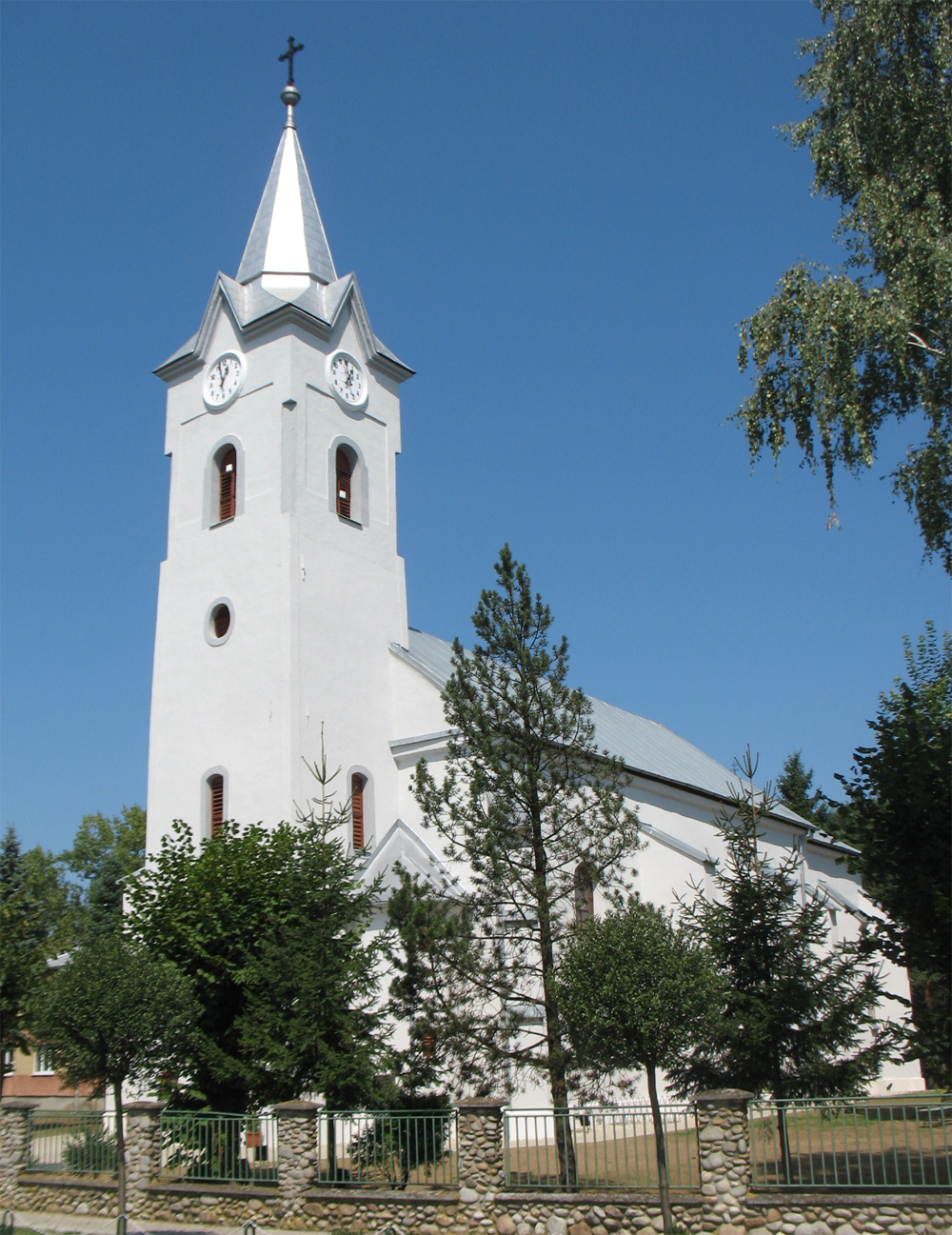
Holy Trinity church (est. 14th century) in Budkovce

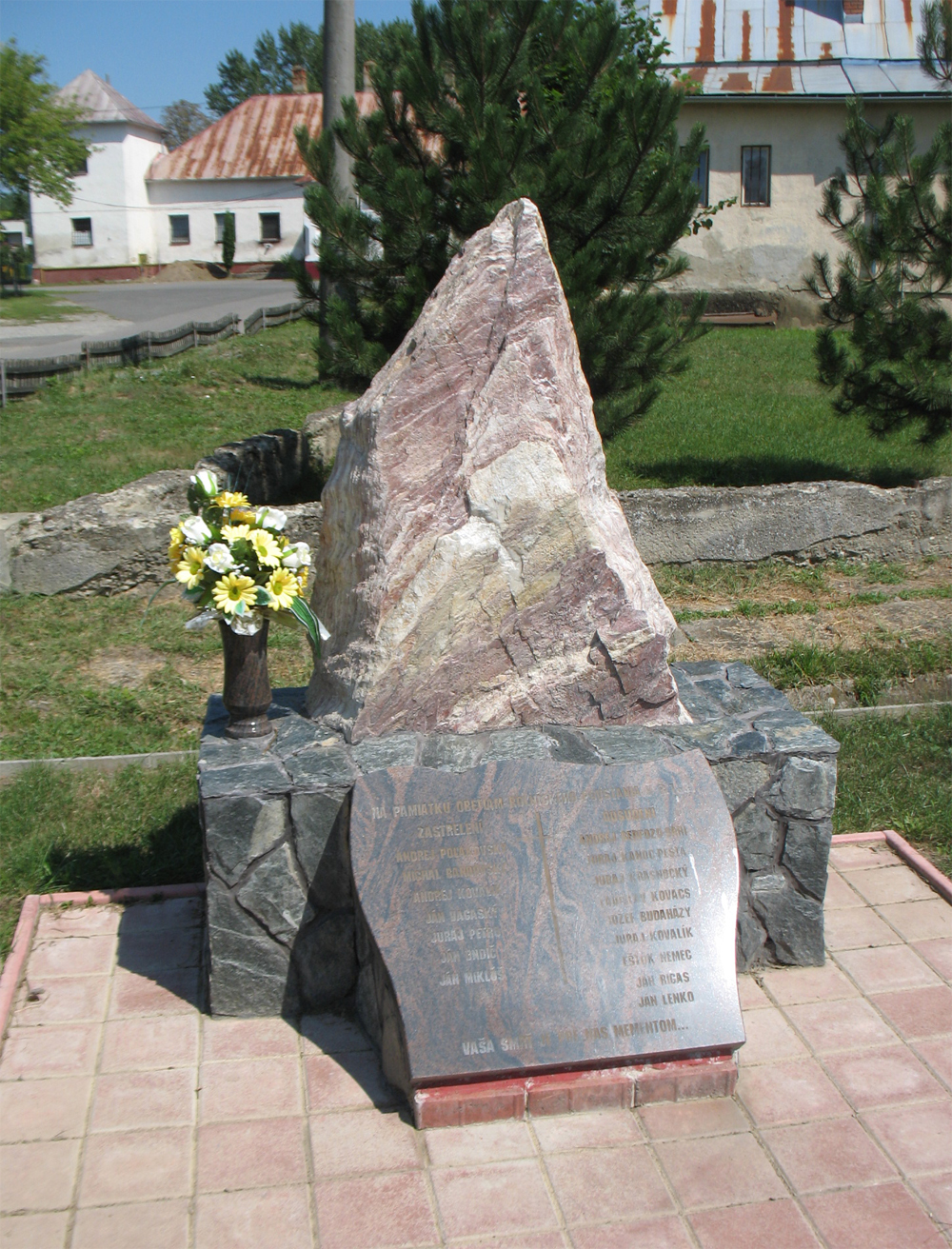
Memorial to the executed victims of the 1831 East Slovak Peasant Uprising

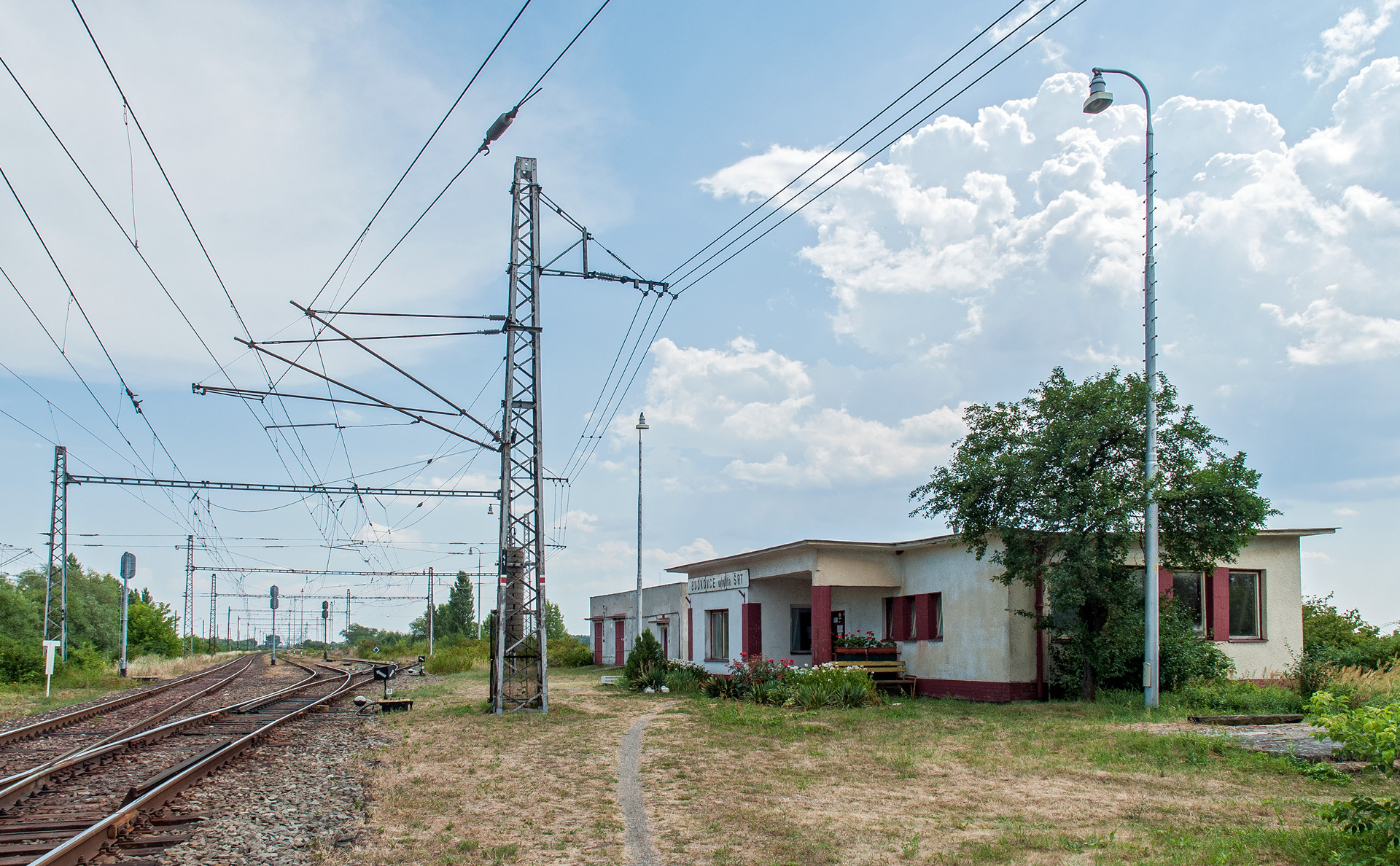
Standard gauge and broad gauge railway and broad gauge freight station in Budkovce

== See also ==
- List of municipalities and towns in Michalovce District
- List of municipalities and towns in Slovakia
