= Slančík =

Village and municipality in Slovakia

Slančík Kisszalánc
- Municipality
- Flag

- Location of Slančík in the Košice Region Location of Slančík in Slovakia
- Coordinates: 48.67°N 21.50°E
- Country: Slovakia
- Region: Košice Region
- District: Košice-okolie District
- First mentioned: 1270

Area
  - Total: 3.30 km^{2} (1.27 sq mi)
- Elevation: 298 m (978 ft)

Population (2025)
  - Total: 218
- Time zone: UTC+1 (CET)
  - Summer (DST): UTC+2 (CEST)
- Postal code: 441 7
- Area code: +421 55
- Vehicle registration plate (until 2022): KS
- Website: slancik.sk

Slančík (Hungarian: Kisszalánc) is a village and municipality in Košice-okolie District in the Kosice Region of eastern Slovakia.

== History ==
In historical records the village was first mentioned in 1270 (Terra Zalanch), when it belonged to Slanec Castle. In 1330 it passed to local Lord Wilhelm Drugeth, and after to noble landowners Losonczy and Forgách.

== Geography ==
The municipality lies at an altitude of 298 metres (978 ft) and covers an area of 3.30 km^{2} (1.27 sq mi) (2025).

== Population ==
Population statistic (10 years)
| Year | 1995 | 2005 | 2015 | 2025 |
|---|---|---|---|---|
| Count | 237 | 223 | 208 | 218 |
| Difference | | −5.90% | −6.72% | +4.80% |

Population statistic
| Year | 2024 | 2025 |
|---|---|---|
| Count | 217 | 218 |
| Difference | | +0.46% |

It has a population of 218 people (31 December 2025).

=== Ethnicity ===
Census 2021 (1+ %)
| Ethnicity | Number | Fraction |
|---|---|---|
| Slovak | 193 | 96.01% |
| Czech | 5 | 2.48% |
| Not found out | 5 | 2.48% |
| Total | 201 | |

In year 2021 was 201 people by ethnicity 193 as Slovak, 5 as Czech, 5 as Not found out, 1 as Russian, 1 as German and 1 as Hungarian.

Note on population: The difference values of population numbers in the table "Population statistic" and in the sections "Ethnicity" & "Religion" is caused by the use of various statistical methods.

=== Religion ===
Census 2021 (1+ %)
| Religion | Number | Fraction |
|---|---|---|
| Roman Catholic Church | 128 | 63.68% |
| Jehovah's Witnesses | 22 | 10.95% |
| Calvinist Church | 15 | 7.46% |
| Greek Catholic Church | 13 | 6.47% |
| None | 13 | 6.47% |
| Not found out | 6 | 2.99% |
| Evangelical Church | 2 | 1% |
| Total | 201 | |

In year 2021 was 201 people by religion 128 from Roman Catholic Church, 22 from Jehovah's Witnesses, 15 from Calvinist Church, 13 from Greek Catholic Church, 13 from None, 6 from Not found out, 2 from Evangelical Church, 1 from Other and 1 from Ad hoc movements.
