= Chop, Ukraine =

City in Zakarpattia Oblast, Ukraine

Chop Чоп Csap
- City
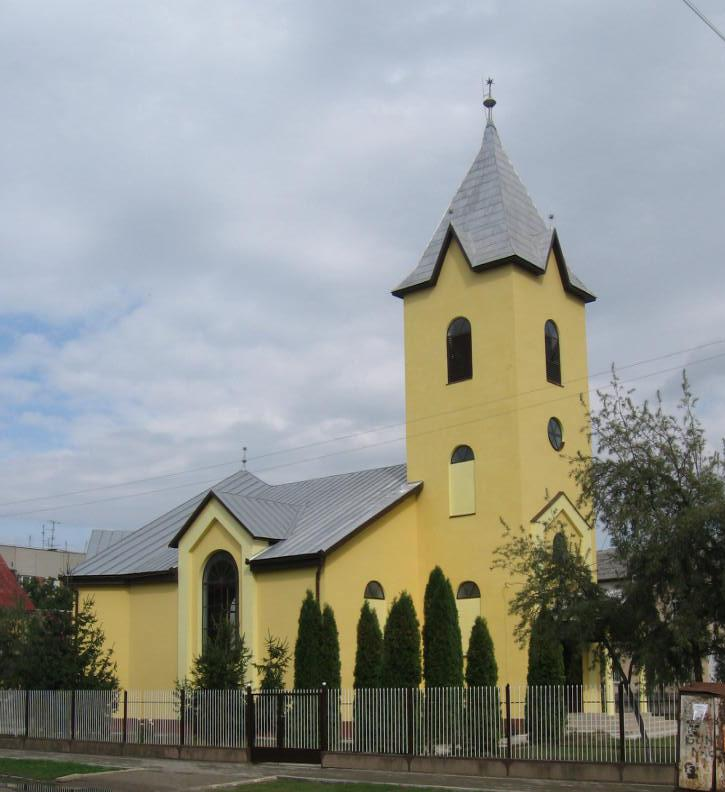
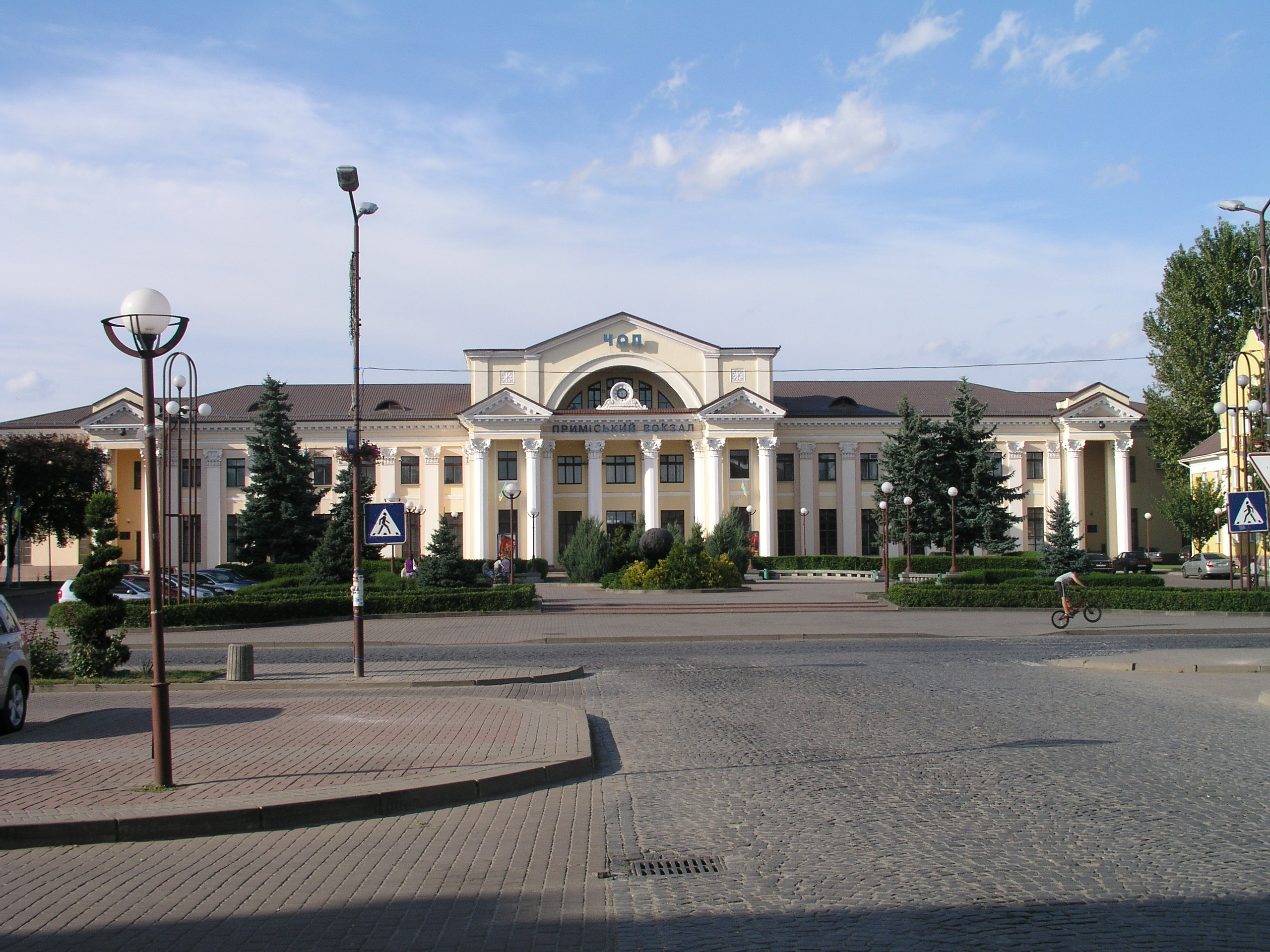
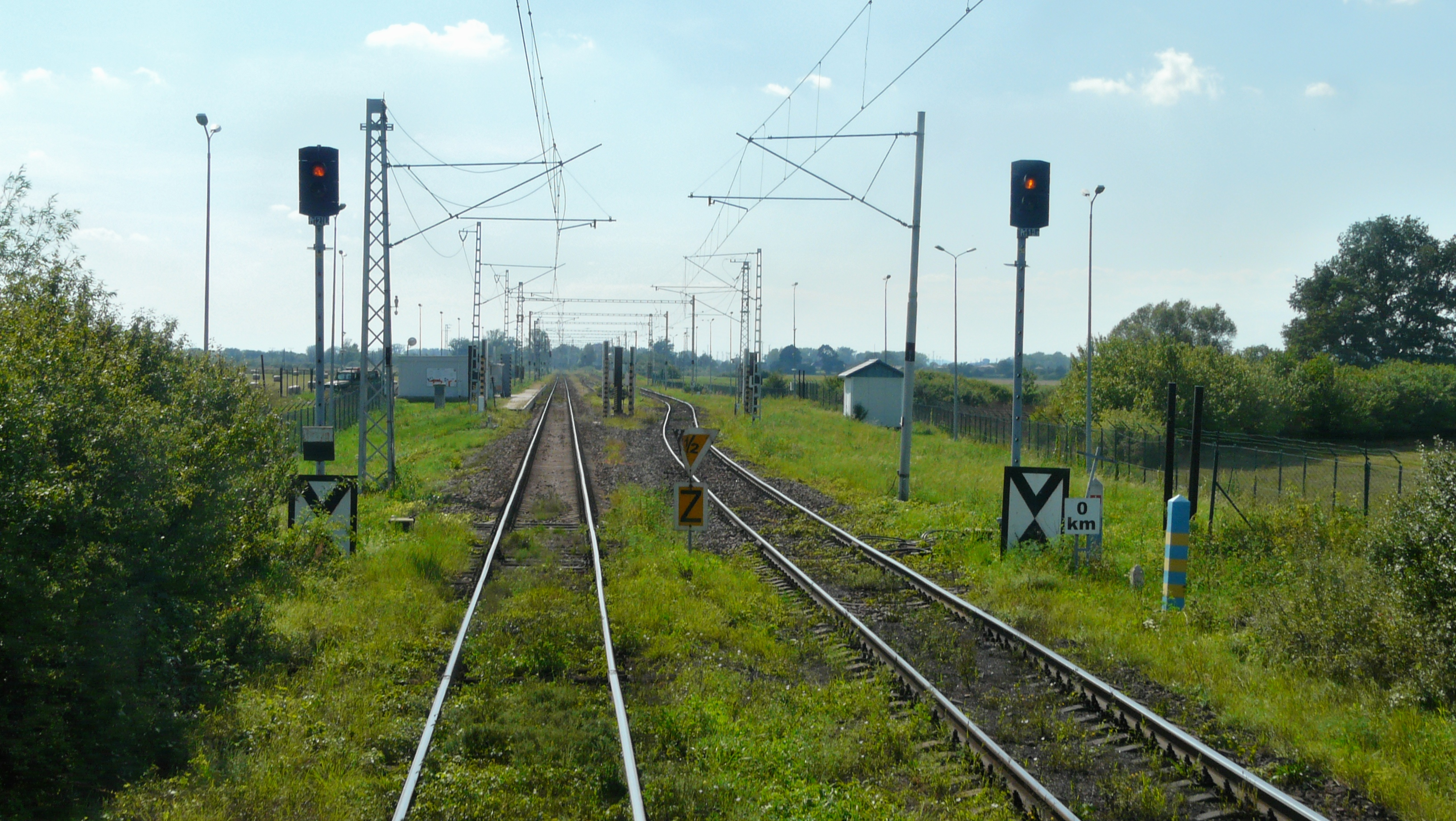
- Clockwise: The new church in 2007, the border crossing in 2014, and the Chop railway station in 2010. Railway station

- Flag Coat of arms
- Interactive map of Chop
- Location of Chop Chop (Ukraine)
- Coordinates: 48°25′50″N 22°12′00″E
- Country: Ukraine
- Oblast: Zakarpattia Oblast
- Raion: Uzhhorod Raion
- Hromada: Chop urban hromada

Government
  - Mayor: Halyna Tsar
- Elevation: 103 m (338 ft)

Population (2022)
  - Total: 8,626
- Time zone: UTC+1 (CET)
  - Summer (DST): UTC+2 (CEST)
- Postal code: 89500 — 89509
- Area code: +380 22
- Climate: Cfb
- Sister cities: Milove (Ukraine); Sokołów Małopolski, (Poland); Záhony (Hungary)
- Website: chop-rada.gov.ua

Chop (Ukrainian: Чоп [tʃɔp]; Hungarian: Csap; Slovak: Čop; Rusyn: Чоп; Yiddish: טשאָפּ, romanized: Tshop) is a city located in Zakarpattia Oblast (province) of western Ukraine, near the borders of Slovakia and Hungary. It is separated from the Hungarian town of Záhony by the river Tisza, being situated on its right bank. It is located in Uzhhorod Raion. Its population is 8,626 (2022 estimate).

== Etymology ==
There are several alternative names used for this city: Hungarian: Csap, Slovak: Čop, German: Tschop, Romanian: Ciop, Polish: Czop, Russian: Чоп, romanized: Čop, Yiddish: טשאָפּ, romanized: Tshop.

== History ==
Like the rest of Transcarpathia, Chop was part of Hungary until 1920, when, as a result of the post-World War I Treaty of Trianon, it was included in the newly created Czechoslovakia, where it belonged to Slovakia, not to Subcarpathian Rus. During World War II, under the First Vienna Award, it briefly became Hungarian again. But, after the war, as part of the Czechoslovakia–Soviet Union relations, it became part of the expanded Ukrainian Soviet Socialist Republic (now Ukraine).

== Demographics ==
According to the Ukrainian national census, Chop had a population in 2001 of 8,919, of whom 48.1% were Ukrainians, 39.4% ethnic Hungarians, while the rest were Roma, Russians, Slovaks, Belarusians, and Jews. The exact composition including small minorities was as follows:

National census (2001)
	percent
Ukrainians	48.08%
Hungarians	39.81%
Russians	8.33%
Gypsies	2.32%
Belarusians	0.79%
Slovaks	0.24%
Poles	0.18%

== Transportation ==
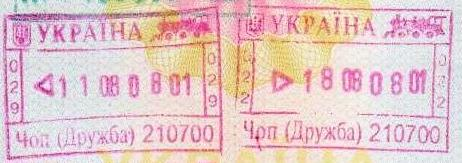
Passport stamps from Chop.

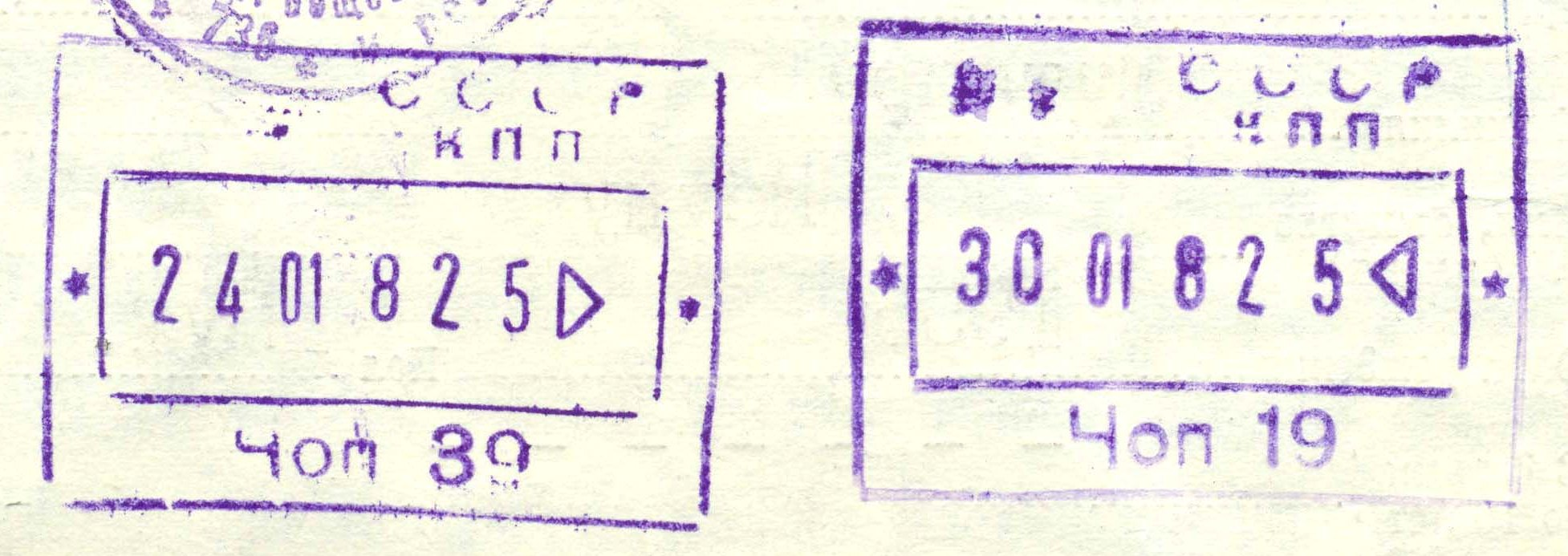
Old 1982 Soviet-era passport stamps from the same crossing.

Chop is an important railway junction in Ukraine where the Lviv-Stryi-Budapest railway line meets the Lviv-Uzhhorod-Košice line. There is also a line running eastwards to Romania via Korolevo and Halmeu although there are currently no regular passenger services.

== Geography ==
Near Chop, there are also international railway border crossing Druzhba to Záhony, Hungary, international railway border crossing Strazh to Čierna nad Tisou, Slovakia, international road border crossing Tysa to Záhony, Hungary, and also to the westernmost point of Ukraine. The first town across the border in Slovakia is Čierna nad Tisou while in Hungary, the first city is Záhony.

== Notable people ==
- András Pándy, serial killer
- J. Peters, political activist

== See also ==
- Chop–Tysa
