= Hungarian toponyms in Zakarpattia Oblast =

This is a list of Hungarian-language toponyms for places in Ukraine's Zakarpattia Oblast.

== Uzhhorod Raion ==
Name	Hungarian
Uzhhorod	Ungvár
Chop	Csap
Serednie	Szerednye
Andrijivka	Bábakút
Antalovci	Antalóc
Baraninci	Baranya
Barvinok	Börvinges
Batfa	Bátfa
Botfalva	Botfalva
Ciganyivci	Cigányos
Chabanivka	Bacsó
Chaslivtsi	Császlóc
Chervone	Csarondahát
Chertesh	Ungcsertész
Cholmec	Korláthelmec
Cholmok	Kincseshomok
Chudlovo	Horlyó
Demecsi	Dimicső
Dovhe Pole	Unghosszúmező
Dubrivka	Ungtölyges
Eseny	Eszeny
Hajdos	Nagygajdos
Haloch	Gálocs
Hliboke	Mélyút
Huta	Unghuta
Iryava	Ungsasfalva
Zharok	Árok
Kamyanicha	Ókemence
Kyblyari	Köblér
Kynches	Kincsestanya
Koncovo	Koncháza
Koritnyani	Kereknye
Linzi	Unggesztenyés
Lyavichi	Lehóc
Mala Dobron	Kisdobrony
Mali Hezhivci	Kisgejőc
Mali Selmenci	Kisszelmenc
Myinazh	Minaj
Nevicke	Nevicke
Nizhniye Solotvino	Alsószlatina
Onokivci	Felsődomonya
Orihovicia	Rahonca
Palad-Komarivci	Palágykomoróc
Pallo	Palló
Packanyovo	Patakos
Petrivka	Kiseszeny or Szernyehát
Pidhorb	Hegyfark
Ravitzi	Rát
Rosivka	Ketergény
Ruski Hezhivci	Sasfalva
Ruski Komarivci	Oroszkomoróc
Sislivci	Sislóc
Siurte	Szürte
Solovka	Szalóka
Solomonovo	Tiszasalamon
Storozhnytsia	Őrdarma
Strypa	Sztrippa
Tarnivci	Ungtarnóc
Tyihlash	Kistéglás
Tysaahtelek	Tiszaágtelek
Tysaashvan	Tiszaásvány
Tysauyfalu	Tiszaujfalu
Velika Dobron	Nagydobrony
Velky Hezhivci	Nagygejőc
Velky Lasy	Nagyláz
Verkhnaya Solotvina	Felsőszlatina
Vovkove	Ungordas
