= Biatorbágy =

- Town
- Flag Coat of arms

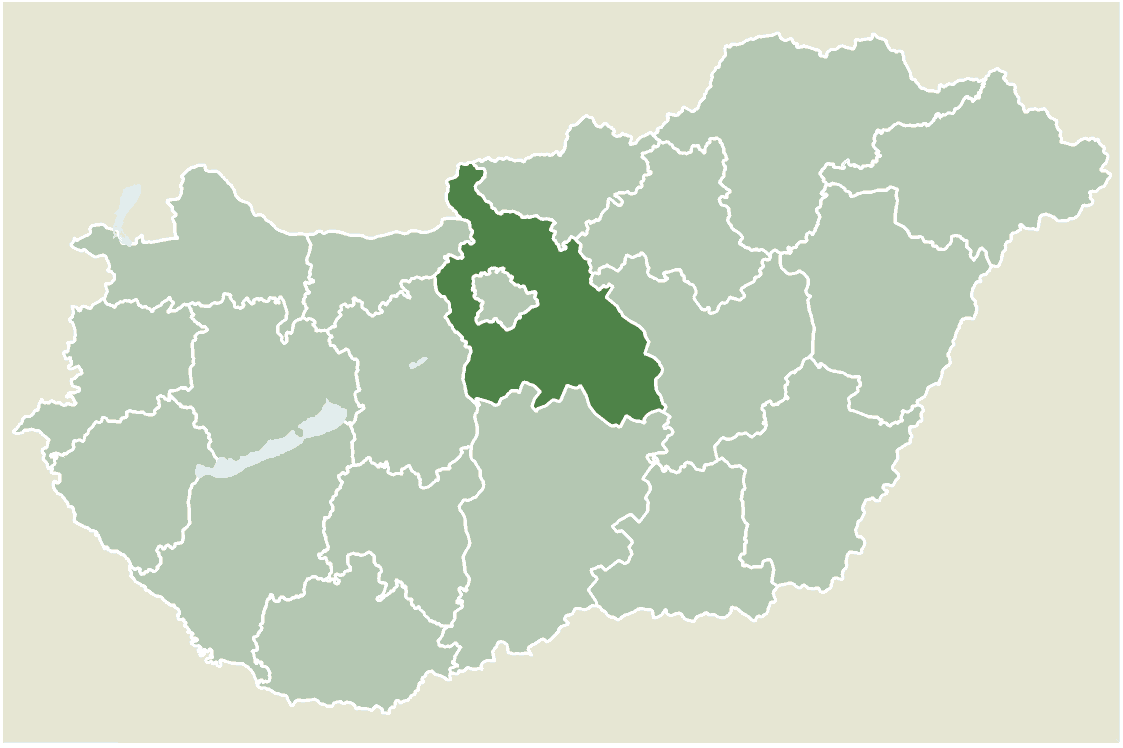
- Location of Pest county in Hungary

- Location of Biatorbágy
- Coordinates: 47.47119°N 18.82520°E
- Country: Hungary
- County: Pest
- District: Budakeszi

Area
  - Total: 43.80 km^{2} (16.91 sq mi)

Population (2017)
  - Total: 13,132
  - Density: 299.8/km^{2} (776.5/sq mi)
- Time zone: UTC+1 (CET)
  - Summer (DST): UTC+2 (CEST)
- Postal code: 2051
- Area code: (+36) 23
- Motorways: M0, M1
- Distance from Budapest: 21.7 km (13.5 mi) East
- Website: www.biatorbagy.hu

Biatorbágy (German: Wiehall-Kleinturwall) is a town in Pest County, Budapest metropolitan area, Hungary. It has a population of 13,889 (2019). It was created in 1966 by the merger of Bia (German: Wiehall) and Torbágy (German: Kleinturwall).

== Districts ==
- Bia (German: Wiehall)
- Torbágy (German: Kleinturwall)

== History ==
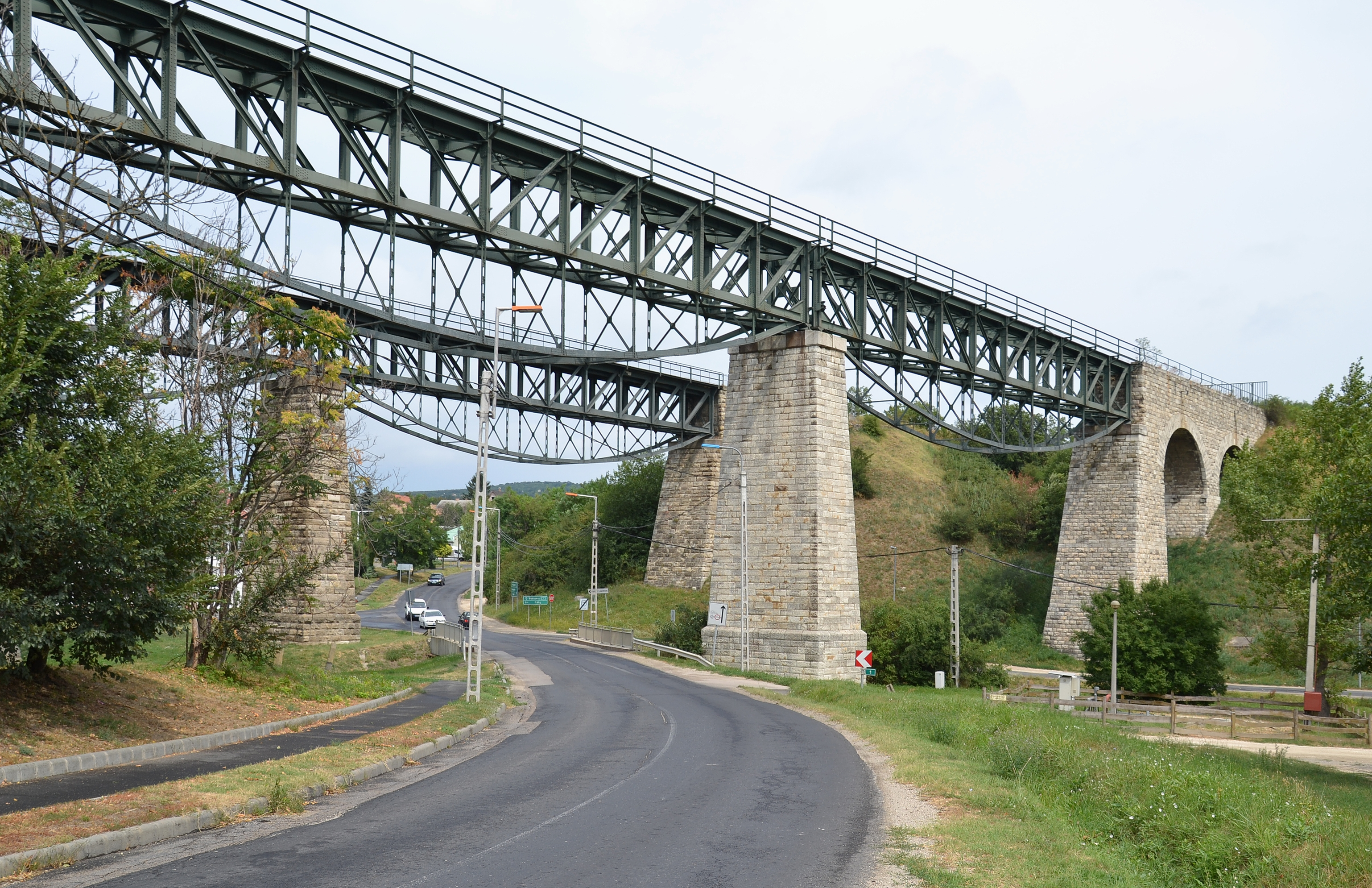
Rail bridge in Biatorbágy

On 13 September 1931 a demented man (Szilveszter Matuska) blasted the train to Vienna on the viaduct of Biatorbágy. Killing 22 and injuring up to 122 people, 17 severely, it has been the most notorious sabotage on his crime history.

== Sport ==
- Biatorbágyi SE, association football club

== Twin towns – sister cities ==
Biatorbágy is twinned with:

- Herbrechtingen, Germany (1989)
- Remetea, Romania (2001)
- Kiti, Cyprus (2004)
- Dolný Štál, Slovakia (2012)
- Velyka Dobron, Ukraine (2013)

== Notable people ==
- Ferenc Juhász (1928–2015), poet
- Gyula Juhász (1930–1993), historian
- Csaba Horváth (born 1971), canoeist
