= Vovkove =

Vovkove (Ukrainian: Вовкове) may refer to the following places in Ukraine:

- Vovkove, Donetsk Oblast, village in Pokrovsk Raion
- Vovkove, Odesa Oblast, village in Berezivka Raion
- Vovkove, Sumy Oblast, village in Romny Raion
- Vovkove, Zakarpattia Oblast, village in Uzhhorod Raion
- Vovkove, former name of Tanivka, village in Berezivka Raion, Odesa Oblast
