= Chop urban hromada =

Chop urban hromada Чопська міська громада
- Hromada
- Seal
- Interactive map of Chop urban hromada
- Country: Ukraine
- Oblast: Zakarpattia
- Raion: Uzhhorod

Area
  - Total: 84.1 km^{2} (32.5 sq mi)

Population
  - Total: 15,545
  - Density: 185/km^{2} (479/sq mi)
- CATOTTG code: UA21100270000015047
- Settlements: 8
- Cities: 1
- Villages: 7
- Website: chop-rada.gov.ua

Chop urban hromada (Ukrainian: Чопська міська громада) is a hromada of Ukraine, located in Uzhhorod Raion of Zakarpattia Oblast in Western Ukraine. Its administrative center is the city Chop.

It has an area of 84.1 square kilometres (32.47119 sq mi) and a population of 15,545, as of 2022.

== History ==
Formed on June 12, 2020, by merging the Chop City Council and the Esen, Solovka, Solomonovo, Tysaashvan and Chervone rural councils of Uzhhorod raion.

== Settlements ==
The hromada contains 8 settlements: a city (Chop) and 7 villages:

- Esen
- Solovka
- Petrivka
- Solomonovo
- Tysaashvan
- Tysauifalu
- Chervone

== Starosta okruhs ==
- Esen starosta okruh
- Petrivka starosta okruh
- Solovka starosta okruh
- Solomonovo starosta okruh
- Tysaashvan starosta okruh
- Chervone starosta okruh
