= Petrivka, Zakarpattia Oblast =

Petrivka Петрівка (Ukrainian)
- Village
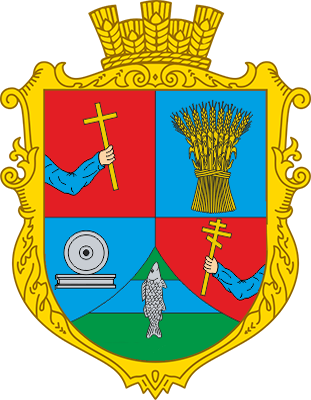
- Coat of arms

- Location within Ukraine Location within Zakarpattia Oblast
- Coordinates: 48°24′0″N 22°18′43″E
- Country: Ukraine
- Oblast: Zakarpattia Oblast
- Raion: Uzhhorod Raion
- Hromada: Chop urban hromada

Government
  - Chairman of the Village Council: Oleksandr Biro

Population (2001)
  - Total: 415
- Time zone: UTC+2 (EET)
  - Summer (DST): UTC+3 (EEST)
- Postal code: 89461
- Area code: +380 0312

Petrivka (Ukrainian: Петрівка) is a village in Chop urban hromada of Uzhhorod Raion (district) of Zakarpattia Oblast (province) in Western Ukraine.

== History ==
The village was founded in the 1930s by immigrants from Velykyi Bereznyi, Mizhhiria, and Khust raions who bought land in the south of Uzhhorod Raion. In the late 1930s, a cemetery was laid out, and a cross and a bell tower were installed there. In 1936, a wooden church was built on the same place, which was destroyed in 1950. However, the community soon rebuilt a new one from rollers, which was also destroyed by the Soviet authorities in 1967. After Ukraine gained its independence in 1991, the community began raising funds to rebuild a new church. The reconstruction was completed in 1992 and was the result of cooperation between the Orthodox and Greek Catholic communities, which now share the church.

In 1936, a small wooden church, apparently of frame construction.

The main craftsmen were Hleba, who came from the village of Babychi, and Mykola Skunts, a native of Mizhhiria. In 1937, the first settlers used the funds to purchase a bell cast in the village of Mali Heevtsi by the famous bell-maker Ferenc Egri. In 1948, the villagers found out that the Soviet authorities wanted to take the bell to the village of Dobron for the needs of the kolkhoz. The villagers hid the bell in their homes until they were allowed to install it in 1952.

The church was dismantled in 1950, but people got permission to rebuild it and the man who took the wood from the church had to return it. The church was rebuilt in a new location, in the cemetery, and at the same time they began to build a new church of rolls on a stone foundation around the wooden structure, with a tiled roof topped by a small tower. All this angered the rayon authorities.

One day in 1967, local officials with KGB officers arrived to the village, and the church was destroyed by a tractor. A simple wooden bell tower remained in the cemetery. The new brick church was built jointly by the Greek Catholic and Orthodox communities, with symbols of both denominations on the sides of the pediment.

On December 23, 1991, the Greek Catholic community of the Descent of the Holy Spirit was founded in the village of Petrivka. Hanna Bubanets (who has been a bell ringer since 1952 and for many years) gave a plot of land for the church.On June 8, 1991, the foundation stone was laid for the construction of the church. Father Yurii Fedaka, who served the faithful of the renewed parish of Petrivka village from 1993 to 2007, made significant efforts to build the church. On May 8, 1993, Father Yurii Fedaka celebrated the first Divine Liturgy on the foundation of the church. The bell from the wooden bell tower at the cemetery was installed in the newly built church in 1996. The new brick church was built jointly by the Greek Catholic and Orthodox communities and has symbols of both denominations on the sides of the pediment. The completed Holy Trinity Church was consecrated by the bishops of the Mukachevo Greek Catholic Church, I. Semedi, J. Holovach, and I. Margitych, in 1996.

On April 5, 2011, Bishop Milan consecrated a memorial plaque hanging on the wall of the church to the zealous servant of Christ's Church, Metropolitan Archpriest George Fedaka, before the Bishop's Divine Liturgy.

== Demographics ==
In January 1989 the population was 392 people: 182 men and 210 women.

It has a population of 415 according to the 2001 census. Native language of the population of the village as of the census:

- Ukrainian: 398 - 95.90%
- Hungarian: 10 - 2.41%
- Russian: 4 - 0.96%
- Belarusian: 1 - 0.24%
- Others: 2 - 0.49%

Estimate 2020 population is 450 people.

== Government and politics ==
The village is part of the Solovka Village Council.

== Infrastructure ==
=== Transportation ===
The village is home to the linear freight and passenger railway station of the Lviv Railways "Esen", where suburban electric trains stop.
