= Solovka railway station =

Railway station in Ukraine

Coordinates: 48.381192°N 22.278748°E

Solovka (Hungarian: Szalóka, Ukrainian: Соловка) is a railway station that is located in a village of Solovka, Uzhhorod Raion in Zakarpattia Oblast. It is part of the Uzhhorod administration (Lviv Railways). The station became a border crossing when the checkpoint was transferred from Batievo to Solovka that is located closer to the border.

The station is an important freight transportation gateway to Ukraine. The station is located in the vicinity of Chop where is located the main railway station in the region. It is located near a railway bridge over Tysa. Solovka serves freight trains exclusively.

== See also ==
- Hungary-Ukraine border

Previous station	Operator	Next Station
Esen	Lviv Railways	Eperjeske (Hungary)
