= Turi Remety =

Village in Zakarpattia Oblast, Ukraine

Turi Remety Тур'ї Ремети
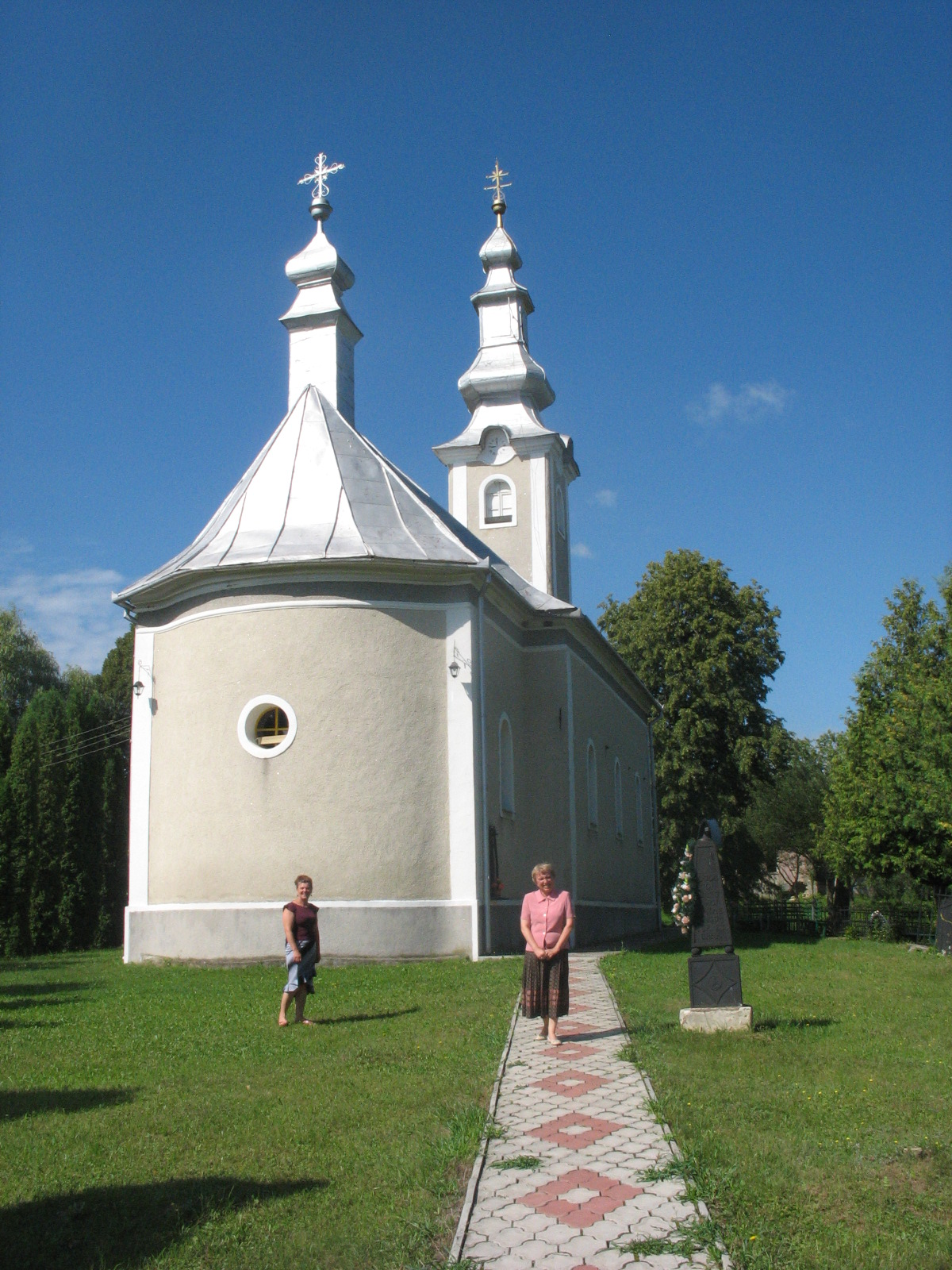
- Church at Turi Remety

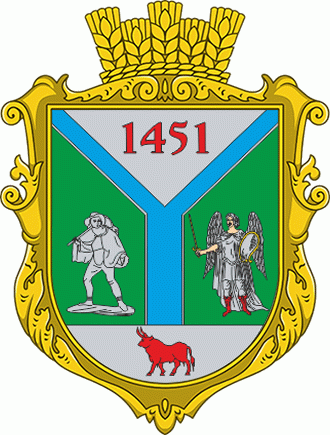
- Coat of arms
- Interactive map of Turi Remety
- Location within Zakarpattia Oblast Location within Ukraine
- Coordinates: 48°42′51″N 22°35′38″E
- Country: Ukraine
- Oblast: Zakarpattia Oblast
- Raion: Uzhhorod Raion
- First mentioned: 1541
- Elevation: 240 m (790 ft)

Population
  - Total: 3,340
- Postal code: 89221
- Area code: +380-3145
- KATOTTH: UA21100210010031664

Turi Remety or Tur'i Remety (Ukrainian: Тур'ї Ремети; Hungarian: Turja-Remete; Slovak: Turie Remety; Czech: Remetské Hámre or Turjanský Remety) is a village in the Uzhhorod Raion of Zakarpattia Oblast, Ukraine, situated on the river Turichka.

Until 18 July 2020, Turi Remety belonged to Perechyn Raion. The raion was abolished in July 2020 as part of the administrative reform of Ukraine, which reduced the number of raions of Zakarpattia Oblast to six. The area of Perechyn Raion was merged into Uzhhorod Raion.

The population of the village is 3,340. It stands at 240 meters above sea level.

The church at Turi Remety has on its outer wall a memorial to Fedor Feketa (c. 1789-1838), who regularly carried the post on foot between the village and the town of Uzhorod for over 30 years. It is believed to be the oldest monument to a postman in the world.

== History ==
Turi Remety was first mentioned in written sources in 1451.

In the 1830s and 1870s, there was a small metallurgical plant here. In the 1830s and 1840s, the products of a small iron foundry on the Turya or Turychka rivers were famous. The iron foundry that operated in Turi Remety in the 1830s and 1870s. The plant also worked for export. That is why the products were stamped with the inscription "Ungvar" (Uzhhorod), not "Turje Remete" — for prestige. The plant also produced grave monuments: several of them still stand in the cemetery around the church. A metallurgical iron foundry operated in the village in the nineteenth century. At that time, specialists from Austria, Germany, and Hungary began to settle in Remete, improving the village life and bringing their own traditions.

The cast-iron statues of Hercules and Hermes, which are now in Uzhhorod Castle, were cast in the village.

== Famous people ==
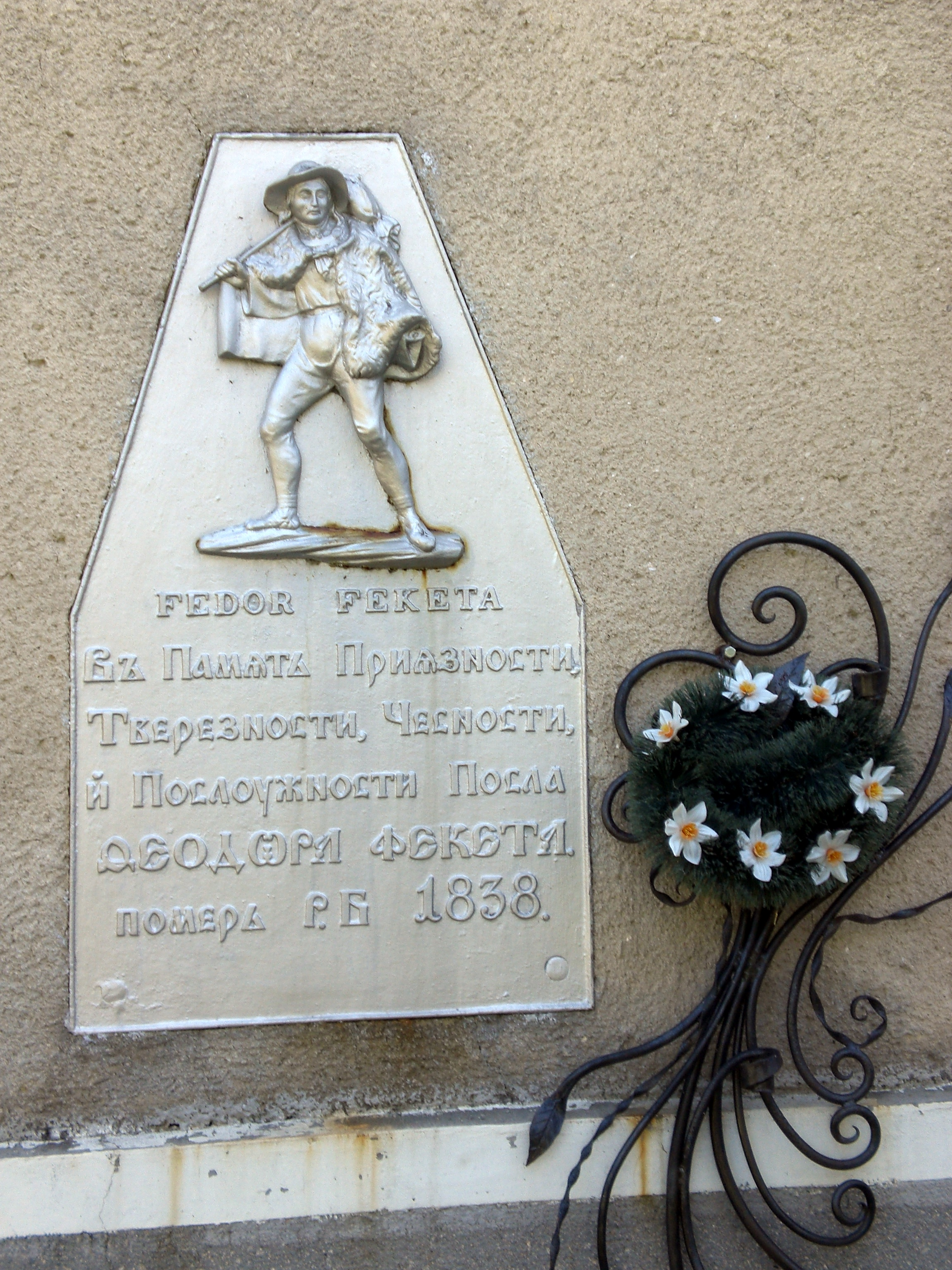
Memorial to Fedor Feketa

The writer and scholar, pastor Ivan Murani (1881-1945) was born in the village.

On 15 October 1925, Magda Ádám, a world-renowned historian and doctor of the Hungarian Academy of Sciences, was born in the village.
