= Magda Ádám =

Hungarian historian and Holocaust survivor (1925–2017)

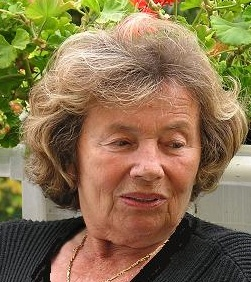
Ádám in 2008.

Magda Ádám (15 October 1925 – 27 January 2017) was a historian, Doctor of the Hungarian Academy of Sciences and scientific advisor to its Institute of History, an honorary fellow of St. Hilda's College, Oxford, and Honorary Professor of Eötvös Loránd University. She was a Holocaust survivor and became an internationally recognized 20th-century historian.

== Biography ==
Ádám was born on 15 October 1925 into a large, close-knit Jewish family in the village of Turi Remety in Subcarpathian Ruthenia, which is a 4,500-square-mile region that, in the course of the 20th century, was ruled by five different nations. After German troops invaded the area in 1944, Magda and her entire family were sent to the Auschwitz concentration camp. Magda and her two sisters who worked as slave laborers survived the camp but the remainder of their family was murdered by Nazi forces.

When the concentration camp was liberated, she moved to Budapest, and married György Ádám, her childhood sweetheart. She enrolled at Lóránd Eötvös University, earned her MA and PhD, and was appointed to the Institute of History of the Hungarian Academy of Sciences in 1955. She worked there until she retired.

=== Research ===
Her academic work included an examination of the circumstances and history of the establishment of the multi-nation alliance called Little Entente, an analysis of Hungarian foreign policy between the two World Wars, a discussion of the determining international factors of the Treaty of Trianon, and research into the relations between the Danubian states. She wrote her candidate's thesis (The Little Entente and Hungary in the 1930s and 1965) and her master's thesis (The Little Entente and Europe 1920–1929, 1984) on that topic.

Ádám's activity in the field of source publication is also significant. Together with the academicians László Zsigmond and Gyula Juhász, she carried out significant activity in the field of source publications. She edited volumes II–III and played a major role in the creation of Diplomatic Documents on the Foreign Policy of Hungary 1936–1945.

She was able to work in six languages and encouraged her students to publish their findings for scholars from multiple nations. She researched, processed and interpreted Hungarian, French, Czech and English sources, thereby conquering new areas of Hungarian historiography and contributing to the creation of a new field of study.

=== Editor ===
As editor-in-chief, she played an initiating and decisive role in the publication of French foreign affairs documents relating to the Carpathian Basin, five thick volumes of which were published in French (Documents diplomatiques français sur l'histoire du Bassin des Carpates, 1918–1932), and selected papers which were being published in Hungarian jointly with Mária Ormos. The majority of the sources published in these volumes come from the archives of the French Ministry of Foreign Affairs. Using the information in these volumes, she made it possible for scholars to form definitive opinions on the circumstances of the Treaty of Trianon, on the emergence of the successor states of the Austro-Hungarian Monarchy in general, and on the European power politics of the 1920s–1930s. The series of publications is also of outstanding international significance. Among many other topics, the nearly two thousand documents depict in detail the activities of the border-setting committees and prove that the resulting state borders were not set due to ignorance but of clear political will. And this political intention was not formed as a result of some instinctive hatred, but as a result of the conflicting interests of the great powers.

Another significant area of her work is her adaptations, which are most closely related to her work as a source researcher. Her four books on the Little Entente, her biographies of Edvard Beneš, and her writings based on extremely rich factual material analyzing the key events of the international relations system of the 1920s and 1930s in connection with the tendencies of Hungarian foreign policy are among the most frequently cited achievements of Hungarian historical scholarship internationally. This was only possible because she paid special attention to the publication of her works in foreign languages: in addition to her studies published in journals in world languages and her volumes of studies published by well-known Western European and American publishers, her works were also published in the languages of the Little Entente countries. An important sign of international interest in her work was that the Variorum Publishing House in England considered it important to issue reprints of her studies published in foreign languages.

Magda Ádám published scholarly work until she reached her late 80's. She died at her home in Budapest, Hungary, 27 January 2017 at 91. She was survived by her daughter, grandson, and three great-grandchildren.

== Selected works ==
- Hungary and the Little Entente in the 1930s (1968); Richtung Selbstvernichtung
- The Little Entente 1920–1938 (1988)
- The Little Entente and Europe (1989)
- The Versailles System and Central Europe (2003)
- Who was Edvard Benes (2009)
- In the Grip of the Great Powers, The Successor States of the Austro-Hungarian Monarchy in the Two World Wars (2014)
