= Ferenc Juhász (poet) =

Hungarian poet

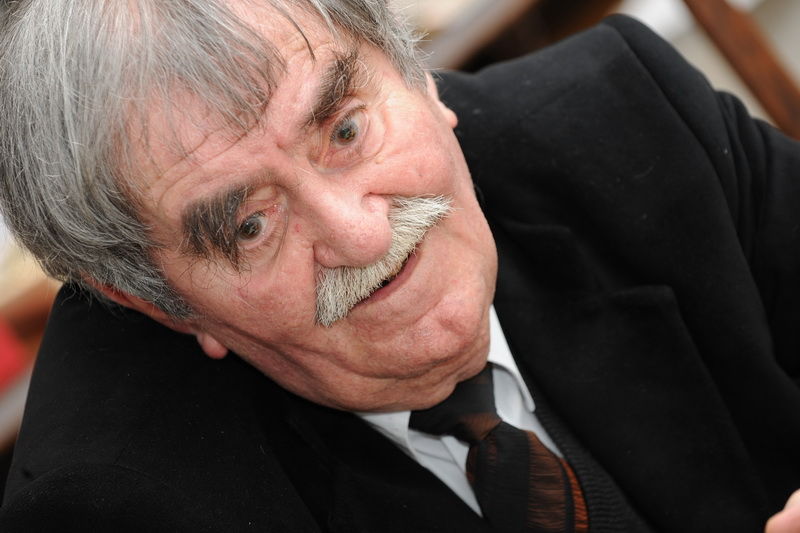
- Ferenc Juhász in 2007
- Born: 16 August 1928; Bia, Hungary
- Died: 2 December 2015 (aged 87); Budapest, Hungary
- Occupation: Poet
- Language: Hungarian

Ferenc Juhász (16 August 1928 – 2 December 2015) was a Hungarian poet and Golden Wreath laureate (1992). He was considered a close contender for the Nobel Prize for Literature in 1976. His brother was historian Gyula Juhász.

Ferenc Juhász published his first poem in 1946. His first book of poems, The Winged Foal, was published in 1949.

His poem The boy changed into a stag clamors at the gate of secrets, has been translated into English.
