= Perechyn Timber-and-Chemical combine =

- Company type: Privately held company
- Industry: wood chemical industry
- Founded: 1894
- Headquarters: Perechyn, Ukraine
- Key people: Oleg Lebedev
- Products: charcoal
- Website: lxk.com.ua

Perechyn Timber-and-Chemical plant is an industrial enterprise in Perechyn, Perechyn district, Zakarpattia Oblast, Ukraine.

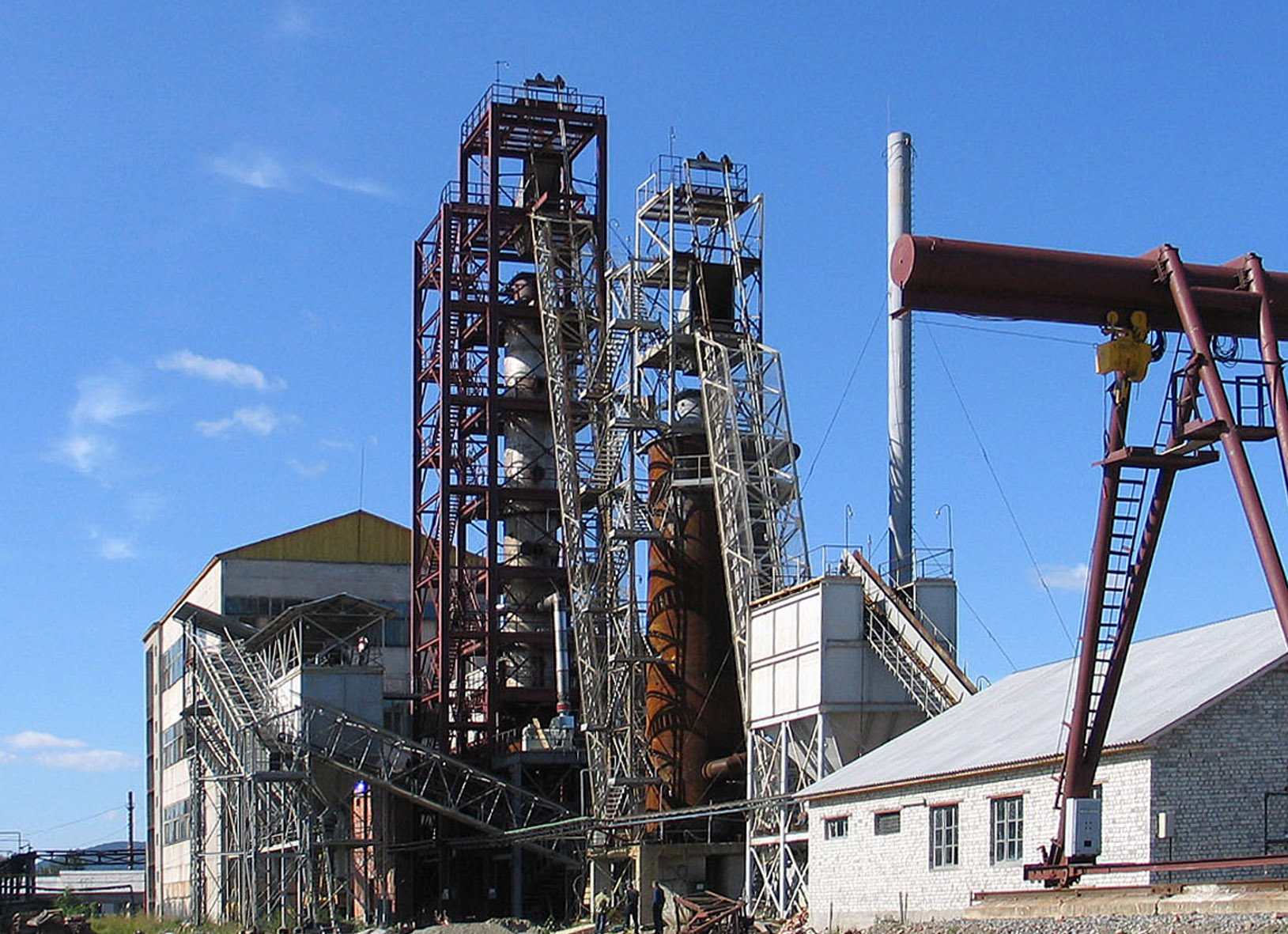
Perechyn Timber-and-Chemical combine

== History ==
In 1893, an Austro-Hungarian joint-stock company "Bantlin" founded a Timber-and-Chemical processing plant of beech dry distillation in Perechyn. Since 1894 it has been producing resin, acetone, methanol and acetic acid. After the build of the railway tracks and the train station in the 20th century – the amount of production has increased significantly. In 1903, there were 272 full-time workers employed, by the beginning of the World War I (Summer 1914) figures had increased to 450 full-time and 200 seasonal employees.

In 1922–1923 the Perechyn plant was refurbished and electrified, a power station was built, factory machinery was transferred to electric traction.

On 27 October 1944, Perechyn was liberated by Red Army's 24th Rifle Division and became a part of the USSR in 1945. In January 1945, the Timber-and-Chemical plant became state-owned.

By the end of 1945, the Perechyn plant started running at full capacity. During this time, the amount of employees there reached 748. The plant had been producing acetic acid, alcohol, acetone and tar. In 1948, ethyl acetate was added to the production list.

Moreover, after the end of the War, the plant took part in providing significant help in restoration of the farms of the local peasants, including provision of building materials and building a greenhouse. In 1957, the plant had begun producing urea-formaldehyde resin. In 1960, a full refurbishment of the formaldehyde department happened. In the beginning of 1962, a permanent retort was built, with a capacity of 75 thousand cubic meters of wood per year (the second biggest in the USSR). This fact substantially helped to mechanize practically all works connected with charcoal production, as well as automate control of the technological process. Generally, from 1946 until 1966, the cost of the gross output increased by more than 30 times.

In 1966, the Perechyn Timber-and-Chemical plant was reorganized into the Perechyn Timber-and-Chemical combine.

Later, the combine had been refurbished once again. It also became gasified, in addition to the second retort put into operation. Two dormitories (up to 200 people each) and 24 accommodations were built for 70 workers and their families. In 1982, the main production items were technical acetic acid, charcoal, formalin, wood resin and smoke flavoring preparation. During the Soviet times, it was known as one of the biggest combines in Perechyn and Perechyn region as a whole. Since Ukraine gained its independence from the Soviet Union, the Timber-and-Chemical combine became an open joint-stock company (PJSC). Going through the period of economic crisis during 90-s – the production numbers started decreasing. In 1998, PJSC "Polyprom" became the new owner of the combine by purchasing a controlling stake.

In December 2000, after several years of inactivity, the pyrolysis workshop of the timber mill resumed operation In 2004, the second retort was built, which resulted in production increase. Throughout 2006, they had produced 13,482.5 tons of urea-formaldehyde resin, 18,297.9 tons of ethyl acetate and 19,833.2 tons of charcoal. A few years later, the Perechyn combine was reorganized into a private limited company.

In 2006, it became the first Ukrainian plant to be tested by the Forrest management system FSC. In February 2008, the plant received a certificate of acceptance for compliance with an international standard ISO 9001:2000.

2011 – it has been approved as an enterprise that maintains high standards of Labor law according to BSCI. In the beginning of April 2014, the Timber-and-Chemical plant was reported as the biggest running enterprise in Perechyn region and the only ethyl acetate manufacturer in the country.

2017 – a new water purifying system was built and later tested in accordance with ISO 9001:2015 standard.

== Modern Days ==
Nowadays, Perechyn Timber-and-Chemical plant is one of the three European manufacturers of charcoal and takes 5% of the market share. The products are being sold in various big supermarkets across the continent, such as TESCO, Ahold, LIDL and Carrefour. In 2019, the Perechyn plant obtained a PEFC (The Programme for the Endorsement of Forest Certification), it is recorded as the first Ukrainian charcoal manufacturer to receive it.

In Ukraine the charcoal products are being sold under ТМ Grilly, which takes the leading positions on the national market in premium segment.

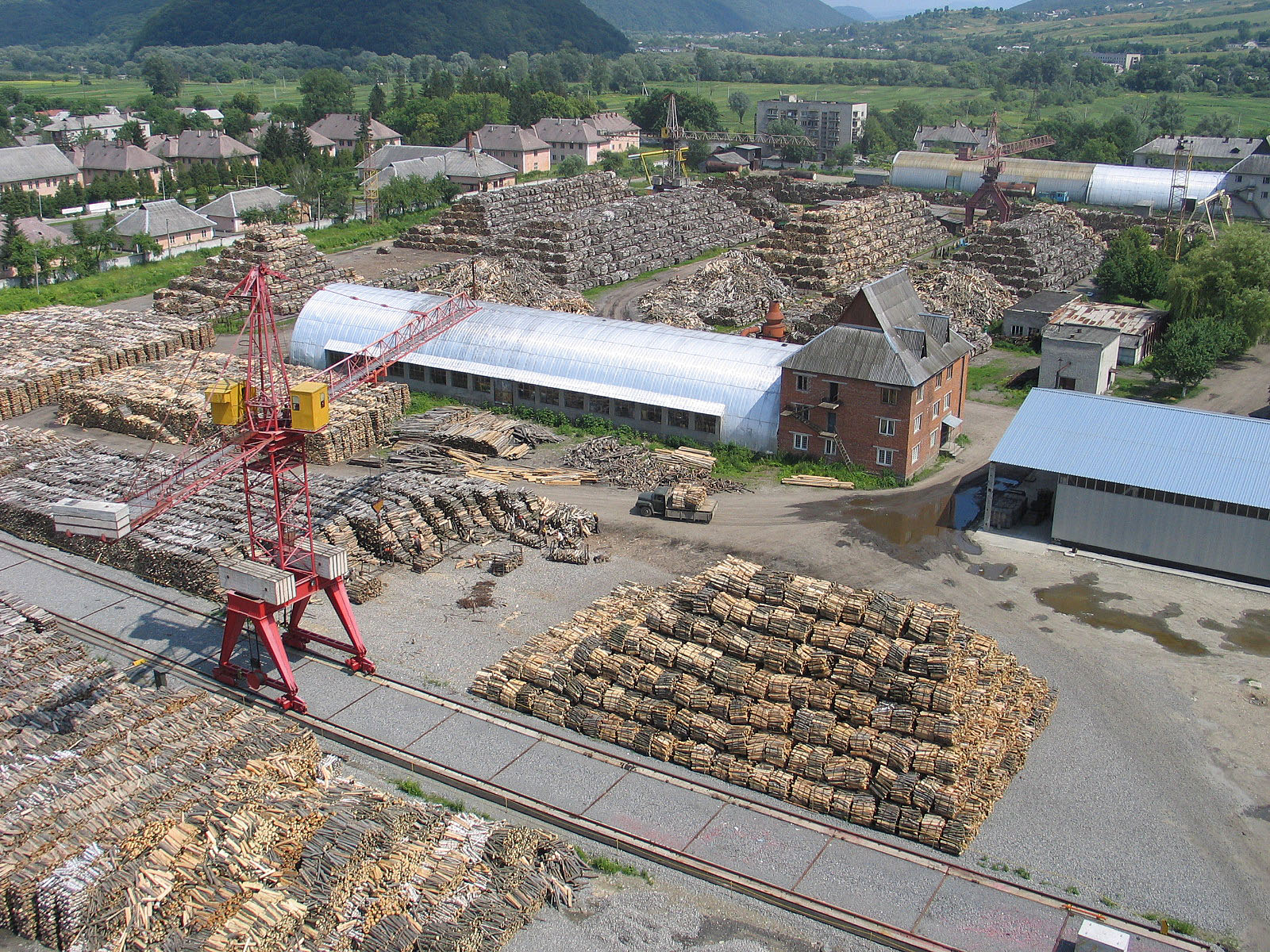
Perechyn Timber-and-Chemical combine

The Perechyn plant is the biggest ethyl acetate manufacturer in Ukraine. The produced ethyl acetate is being exported to more than 10 European countries. They use it in chemical industry, pharmaceutics and typography. Urea-formaldehyde resin (UFR) is the key element for chipboard, fiberboard and plywood production in Ukraine and Europe as a whole. This resin has low toxicity and low levels of free formaldehyde. Plywood, chipboard and other similar products, which use this type of resin, comply with Е-0, Е-0.5, Е-1 emission class. Product quality, management system and high social standards comply with all European environmental requirements, therefore the plant was awarded with BSCI, REACH, ISO and PEFC certifications.
