= Chabanivka =

Coordinates: 48°29′29″N 22°32′50″E

Chabanivka (pronounced: Tscha-ba-novka; Hungarian: Bacsó) is a village in Uzhhorod Raion, Zakarpattia Oblast, Ukraine.

It was part of the Kingdom of Hungary (11th century - 1918 and 1938–1944) with the name of Bačsava in the Ungvári járás (district) and Ung megye (county), next part of Czechoslovakia (1918–1938) with the name of Bačovo in Podkarpatská Rus (Sub-Carpathia), then part of the Soviet Union (Ukraine) (1945–1993) with the name of Čsabanyivka in the Uzhhorod (district) and since 1993 known as Chabanivka in the Uzhhorod Raion (district) and the Zakarpats'ka Oblast (county) of Ukraine.

Other spellings/names for Chabanivka are: Bacsó, Batčhive, Čhabanowka, Tschabaniwka, and Tschabanowka. In Yiddish, Chabanivka was referred to as Batscheve.

Chabanivka is located 15 miles SE of Uzhhorod, 8 miles WNW of Mukacheve.
