= Poroshkovo =

Village in Zakarpattia Oblast, Ukraine

Poroshkovo Порошково
- Village
- Location within Zakarpattia Oblast Location within Ukraine
- Coordinates: 48°39′59″N 22°45′05″E
- Country: Ukraine
- Oblast: Zakarpattia Oblast
- Raion: Uzhhorod Raion

Population (2001)
  - Total: 3,786
- Time zone: UTC+2 (EET)
  - Summer (DST): UTC+3 (EEST)

Poroshkovo (Ukrainian: Порошково; Hungarian: Poroskő; Romanian: Poroșcovo) is a village in Uzhhorod Raion of Zakarpattia Oblast in Ukraine.

Until 18 July 2020, Poroshkovo was located in Perechyn Raion. The raion was abolished and its territory was merged into Uzhhorod Raion in July 2020 as part of the administrative reform of Ukraine, which reduced the number of raions of Zakarpattia Oblast to six.

== Demographics ==
According to the 1989 census, the population of Poroshkovo was 3,410 people, of whom 1,676 were men and 1,734 women.

Native language as of the Ukrainian Census of 2001:

- Ukrainian 92.93%
- Romanian 5.65%
- Romani 0.68%
- Russian 0.34%
- Slovak 0.10%
- Moldovan (Romanian) 0.05%
- Hungarian 0.05%
- German 0.03%

The Romanians on the area of Poroshkovo are known as volohi (cf. Vlachs) in Romanian. According to Romanian media, Poroshkovo and other neighbouring villages are of Romanian-majority and Romanians form a 10,000–15,000-strong community in the region.
