= Good Samaritan Children's Home =

Coordinates: 48.4184°N 22.4017°E

The Good Samaritan Children's Home is an orphanage in Velika Dobrony, Zakarpattia Oblast, Ukraine. Established in 1995, the orphanage serves girls ages 2 through 12 and is operated by the Reformed Church of Transcarpathia.

== History ==
In the mid 1980s the Dutch relief organisation Stichting Hulp Oost-Europa delivered a large amount of humanitarian relief to many Ukrainian state orphanages. This, however, failed to reach the children. Having satisfied themselves that this was the case and in view of the dreadful state of affairs prevailing at that time in Ukrainian state orphanages; the lack of basic hygiene, indifference towards the children, the physically and intellectually disabled condition of the children, the poor condition of the buildings and the impracticality of improvement, they decided to set up a Christian children's home which could serve as a model for the whole of Ukraine. At the time of the break-up of the Soviet Union, Stichting Hulp Oost-Europa together with the Weeshuis der Hervormden (Lindenhof) and the Partnerhilfe foundations started to organise this, and by March 1995 after two years of construction the brand new, two-cone basic building (more than 130x130 feet) in Nagydobrony, near Uzhhorod in Ukraine was ready for occupation. On December 1, 1995 the children's home was handed over with all due ceremony to the district of the Reformed Church of Transcarpathia to which it officially belongs.

From its inception the establishment made every endeavour after self-sufficiency by setting up its own farm. Supporting funds were sufficient from the very beginning for a wide variety of things, so much so that whatever new building was needed it could be built from the surplus. In the course of time, however, due to continually rising prices and cost of wages coupled with stagnation of supporting funds, not only was the work unable to be finished but now the yearly support funds do not even cover the minimum annual wage of the children's carers alone. In reality, the majority of the workers are on a partly voluntary basis. Compensation for the below-average wages is by allowances in kind and other concessions e.g. holiday leave. Electricity and gas is purchased at industrial prices, and for that reason it has not been possible so far to implement gas heating - it is too expensive. The Ukrainian state has provided no material assistance, apart from an up-to-date computer in February 2007 from the district council. As one of the models for the country, the children's home is visited every year by government ministers, various regional medical officers and some church bishops too.

== Facilities ==
The children's home itself is situated in an area of 22 acres (89,000 m^{2}). Here is the main building and a large outbuilding which everybody simply refers to as the "new building". In this area, too, are the cowshed, stables, pig shed and various other farm buildings, garages, the workshop and stores. There are 7 polytunnels (i.e. polyethylene greenhouses) which alone cover an area of 23.000 SF. It can be seen from the foregoing how much dependence there is on the farm (set up through considerable effort) together with gifts from abroad. In the fields and polytunnels, among other things, carrots, parsley, kohlrabi, potatoes, radish, cauliflower, peas, beans, tomatoes, paprika, beetroot, cabbage etc. are grown. Out of this, other institutions are supported too. An apiary provides honey for the children. Cattle and pig stocks provide meat and dairy produce: milk, sour cream and cottage cheese. Altogether, approx. 120 acres (0.49 km^{2}) is under cereals: spelt, durum wheat and other milling wheat, providing all-year-round feeding for the animals. Unfortunately, more often than not, they are unsuitable for bread flour. The working bakery supplies the daily bread requirements, also rolls and approx. 15 types of bakery produce. The bakery was set up with the help of donations from the Netherlands and the U.S.A. and has been in production since December 2004.

The agricultural work required implements so, the staff (partly from donations) set up a machine pool consisting of several tractors. The upkeep and repair of the tractors and implements is done by the staff. Since 1999 there has been a combine harvester, and in 2006 the SARA foundation in the [United States - USA] donated a brand new [Belarus tractor].

The children take part in looking after the animals and in agricultural work so that they may experience what kind of work provides the food that reaches the table. The aim for the children is that they should become useful members of the community. For those children, who, on account of handicap, will not be able to leave the children's home, an appropriate field of activity is ensured so that they will not feel themselves superfluous. So those girls wishing to proceed to further studies get whole-hearted support to help them reach the goals they have set themselves.

There are a great many foreign visitors, so from 2005 a guest house has provided suitable accommodation for supporters. The guest house provides a conference hall with a seating capacity of 60, giving opportunity to different organisations and groups to organise conferences e.g. medical, mental health care, agriculture etc.

The children's home keeps up a very good relationship with state orphanages, schools, children's hospitals, psychiatric hospitals and institutions for the blind and deaf. From the crops and the humanitarian aid received, distribution is made (according to ability) to the above-mentioned and other institutions.

== Services ==
Children from 2 years old to 12 years old are taken in - but only girls. Admission does not consider creed or ethnic background; only their need of help (i.e. difficult social environment) or those who are seriously handicapped physically or psychologically, orphans, one-parent children or those in situations where they are endangered. 32 of the children are such as have been given up by their parents. 3–4 years old children with various medical conditions have come from state orphanages, each one of them diagnosed there as mentally and physically handicapped and lacking the ability to speak. By the grace of God, love and care can work wonders, since nearly all of these children can now speak, and right now 33 children out of the 73 in the home attend the village school - and not with poor results either. Five are now 1st and 2nd year pupils in the Nagydobrony Reformed Lyceum. From among the primary school children 5 attend music school. In the children's home itself there is a special class. 17 children do not go to school, 16 go to this special class, and the other 2 have already finished school and now work, one as a kitchen assistant and the other as a secretary in the home.

This is not a closed institution like the state orphanages. These children who are physically and mentally capable of attending school go by themselves to Nagydobrony High School more than 1000 yards away. The older children attend church and take part in other activities too. Here the children know the people in the village, they see the flowers, trees and animals belonging to the houses. They learn the rules of the road, they know their environment, they meet friends and so it will be easier for them later on to make their way in life. Over and above this the children will stay as long as they need to, that is for their whole lives.

Members of the local and neighbouring congregations can take their "own children" home from noon on Saturday till Sunday afternoon every second week. Only such persons can do this as are morally suitable. We seek by means of these family visits to form in the children a true picture of Christian family life which in a state institution they could never experience.

The children are divided into 9 groups. In setting up each group, age, personality and physical and mental capabilities are taken into account. In each group there are 6-8 children. Each room has its own washroom and the disabled have their own specially fitted out washroom. Education is provided in the building for those who are either physically incapable of going to school or who are intellectually disabled. In the grounds there is a flower bed (60 yards long by 30" wide) for the children where even those confined to wheel-chairs can enjoy the pleasure of gardening. In the building there is a computer room with permanent internet access, a therapy room, a library, a study room and a practice kitchen.

The children have the possibility of using various open-air recreational facilities suited to each age group. There are three small play areas, a soccer field, a 23 feet (7.0 m) diameter swimming pool and the opportunity to go horse riding too. there is also a fish pond on which it is possible to go boating and each child who can ride a bicycle has one of her own. The children often go on trips to the nearby woods and regularly organise various outings during the holidays. Visits are made to the well known sights and towns of Carpathia. Sometimes neighbouring towns are visited so that they get to know town life as well.
