= Perechyn Raion =

Former subdivision of Zakarpattia Oblast, Ukraine

Perechyn Raion Перечинський район
- Raion
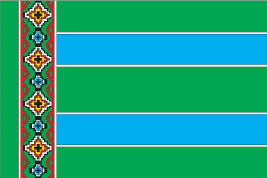
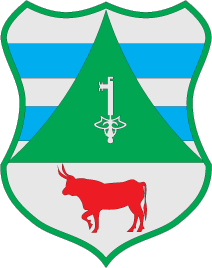
- Flag Coat of arms

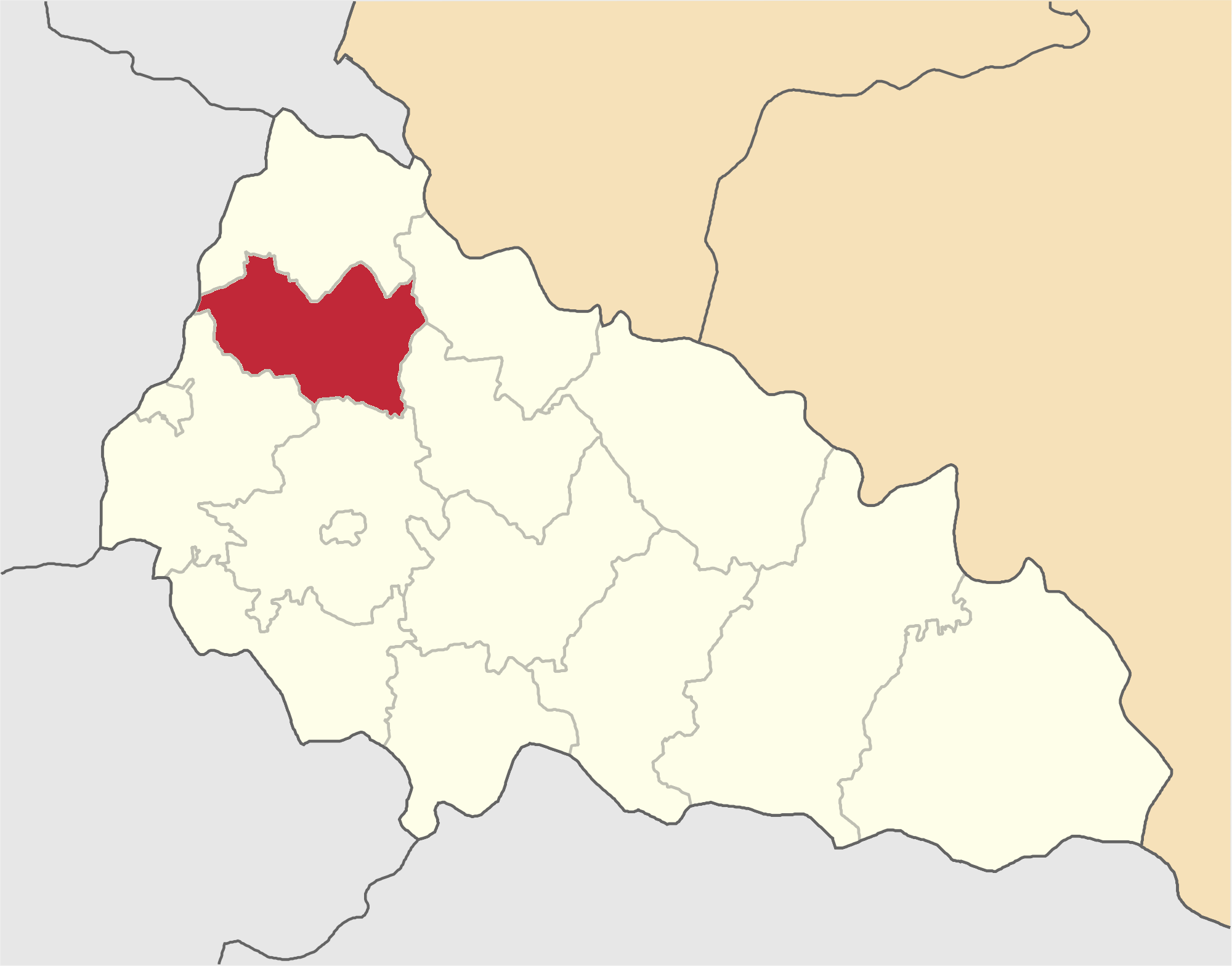
- Coordinates: 48°44′17.67″N 22°28′50.21″E
- Country: Ukraine
- Oblast: Zakarpattia Oblast
- Established: 1947
- Disestablished: 18 July 2020
- Admin. center: Perechyn
- Subdivisions: List: — city councils; — settlement councils; — rural councils; Number of localities: — cities; — urban-type settlements; 24 — villages; — rural settlements

Area
  - Total: 631 km^{2} (244 sq mi)

Population (2020)
  - Total: 31,688
  - Density: 50.2/km^{2} (130/sq mi)
- Time zone: UTC+02:00 (EET)
  - Summer (DST): UTC+03:00 (EEST)
- Area code: 380-3264
- Website: http://perechyn.adm.org.ua/

Perechyn Raion (Ukrainian: Перечинський район; Rusyn: Перечинскый район; Romanian: Raionul Perecin) was a raion of Zakarpattia Oblast in western Ukraine. Its administrative center was Perechyn. The raion was abolished and its territory was merged into Uzhhorod Raion on 18 July 2020 as part of the administrative reform of Ukraine, which reduced the number of raions of Zakarpattia Oblast to six. The last estimate of the raion population was 31,688 (2020 est.)

A Romanian community, known as volohi in Romanian, also inhabited this raion, more specifically in the area of the village of Poroshkovo.

== See also ==
- Administrative divisions of Zakarpattia Oblast
