= Perechyn =

City in Zakarpattia Oblast, Ukraine

Perechyn Перечин
- City
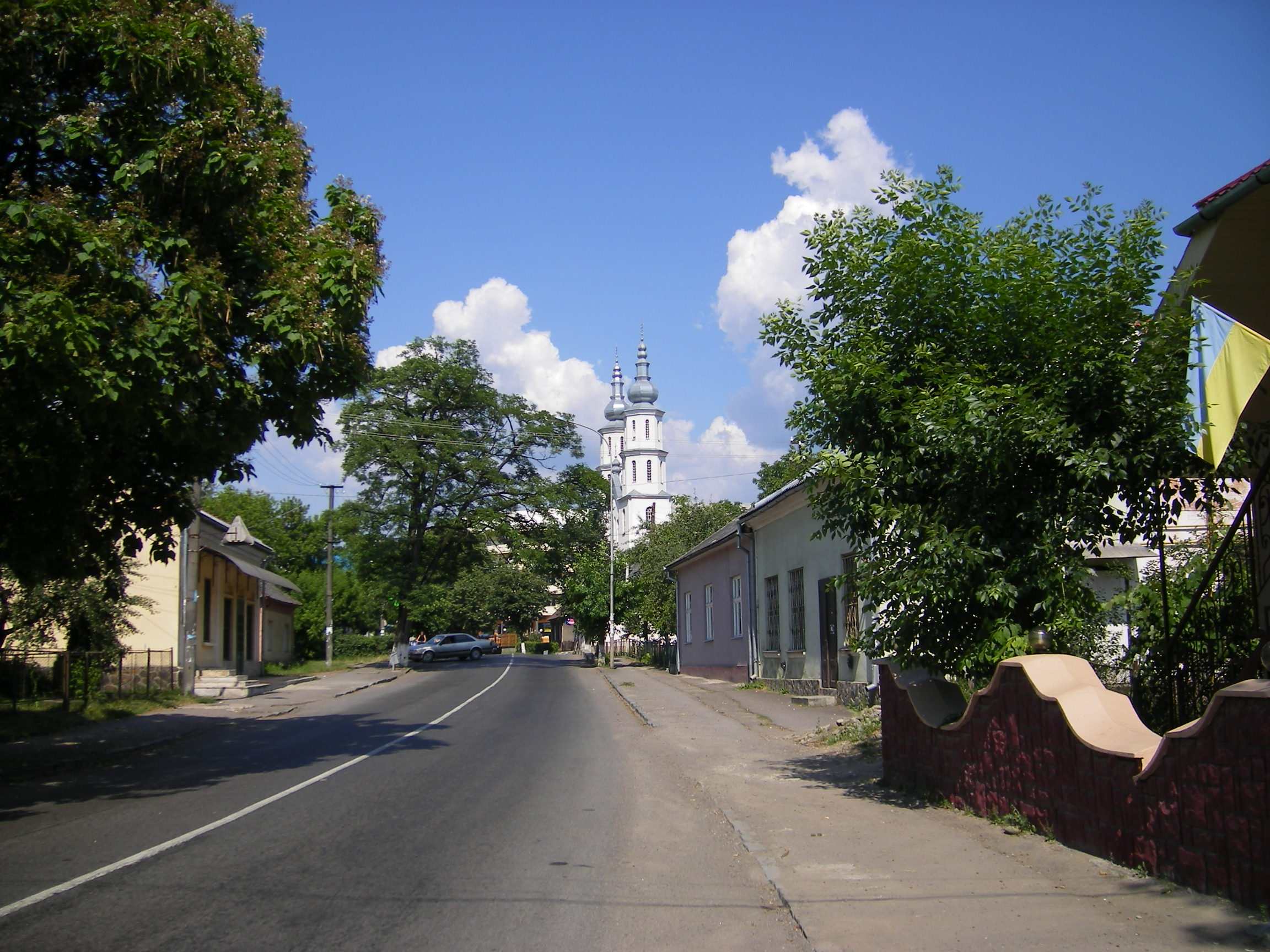
- A street in Perechyn

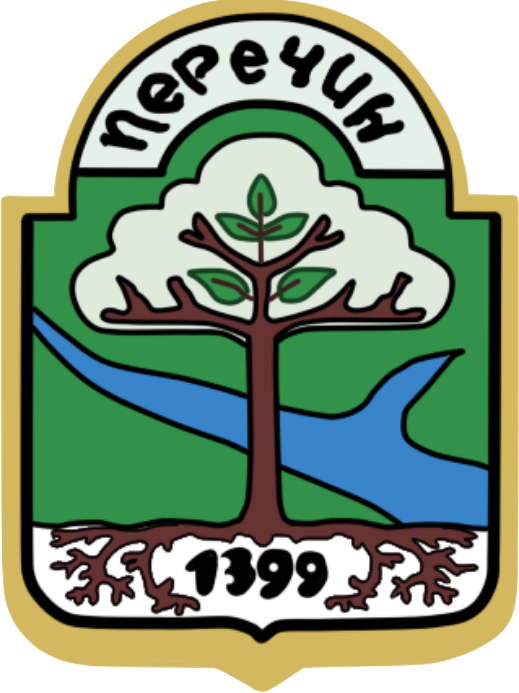
- Flag Coat of arms

- Location of Perechyn in Zakarpattia Oblast Location in Ukraine
- Coordinates: 48°44′03″N 22°28′27″E
- Country: Ukraine
- Oblast: Zakarpattia Oblast
- Raion: Uzhhorod Raion
- Hromada: Perechyn urban hromada
- Founded: 1427
- City Status: 4 March 2004

Government
  - Mayor: Ivan Pohorilyak

Area
  - Total: 7.45 km^{2} (2.88 sq mi)
- Elevation: 149 m (489 ft)

Population (2022)
  - Total: 6,477
  - Density: 869/km^{2} (2,250/sq mi)
- Time zone: UTC+1 (CET)
  - Summer (DST): UTC+2 (CEST)
- Postal code: 89200
- Area code: +380 3145
- Climate: Dfb
- Website: perechyn.com.ua

Perechyn (Ukrainian: Перечин, IPA: [pereˈtʃɪn]; Hungarian: Perecseny; Rusyn: Перечин) is a city in Zakarpattia Oblast, Ukraine. It was the administrative centre of the former Perechyn Raion (district). It is now part of the Uzhhorod Raion. Today the population is 6,477 (2022 estimate).

== Names ==
There are several alternative names used for this city: Hungarian: Perecseny, German: Peretschyn, Slovak: Perečín, Romanian: Perecin, Russian: Перечин, romanized: Perečin, Belarusian: Пярэчын, romanized: Piarečyn.

Some locals believe that "Perechyn" which means "crossing" or "crossroad" derives its name from the crossing of two valleys from which flow the Turya and Uzh Rivers, which forms the basis of the coat of arms. Others believe the name is derived from surname of a landowner tycoon named Perecha around a disputed land issues between residents of neighboring villages and the word "to change" (redo). Still others believe the name comes from when the village was divided into an "upper and lower end". Prashnytsya, the lower end, was a dried swamp in which dust was kicked up when large numbers of animals and people moved about. Much like a smoke signal, "pereich" (watchers from the distant Nevetskiy castle) could interpret the dust cloud as possible approaching danger.

== Demographics ==
In 2001, the population included the following:

- Ukrainians (96.3%)
- Russians (1.3%)
- Slovaks (1.0%)

== About the city ==
The city of Perechyn is nestled between the Carpathian Mountains some twenty kilometers north of Uzhhorod.

With a population of around 7000 people living in a territory of 7.45 km², this small city swells to larger numbers on the weekends when people from neighboring villages come to shop in this rayon center and during summer months when tourists traverse the mountain road on their way North to Lviv.

For centuries, the region has included a variety of ethnolinguistic groups including Lemki (or Lemkos), Boyki (or Boykos/Highlanders), Romani, Jews, and others. Additionally, there are many nationalities living there. These mainly include Ukrainians, but living among them are Slovaks, Hungarians, Germans, Italians, and other nationalities.

== Schools ==
There are three active schools in Perechyn.

The Perechyn Central School located near the regional administration educates middle and high school students from the town. A lyceum, on the northern outskirts of Perechyn, serves as a trade school for youth going into service industries. The Perechyn Humanitarian Gymnasium (a regional high school), housed in the Palace of Culture, is recognized by its highly visible castle-like architecture. In addition to preparing students for university, the gymnasium focuses on the development of specialized language skills including Ukrainian, Russian, Slovakian, German, and English.

An enormous U-shaped building on the outskirts of Perechyn on the road to Uzhgorod once housed nearly 500 students. The Perechyn Boarding School or "shkoli internat" (orphanage) was closed the early 2000s with the expansion of foster programs in Ukraine.

In 2022, the town took in thousands of Ukrainians fleeing war in the East many of whom took refuge in the classrooms and dormitory sections of the school.

== Industry ==
Perechyn is home to more than 200 businesses and 300 private enterprises.

Among the largest include the Perechyn Timber and Chemical Plant (Bantlin), founded in 1893. During Soviet times near 800 people worked in the factory which supplied charcoal, ethyl acetate, carbomido-formaldehyde resins and other materials to more than 15 countries. Other heavy industry includes the OJSC "Perechynskiy Lisokombinat", LLC "Samver", JV "Karpat-austro", LLC "Cornelia-Trade", JSC "Perechynske DP" which have all been active participants in the forest products industry.

Light industry includes the LLP "Perechynska Sheveyna Fabrika" (textiles), LLP Zherela Karpat (food), JSC "Steatite" (porcelain and earthenware for electrical insulation), and the publishing house "Tour Press".

In 2023, Friendly Windtechnology (formerly of Kramatorsk) broke ground on the construction of factory to produce wind turbines.

== Civil society ==
Perechyn hosts a number of active civic organizations.

The Perechyn Center for Civic Initiatives has carried out hundreds of projects focused on building democracy and civic engagement throughout the region and using resources from around the world, including hosting five U.S. Peace Corps volunteers.

The NGO Opika (which means 'guardian' in Ukrainian) provides programs designed to assist economically disadvantaged people, especially children. The organization brings children and youth from surrounding schools together to regularly perform traditional dances, music concerts and shows, including "Perechyn Day" which is celebrated each year on the 28th of June. The collective is well-known in Ukraine having performed for President and Mrs. George W. Bush during a diplomatic visit in 2008 and traveling to the U.S. in 2011 to perform at the Smithsonian Folklife Festival.

== Tourism ==
A monument to the beloved Fedor Feketa stands in the main square. Feketa traveled 30 kilometers by foot each week carrying the mail to villages throughout the region. Legend has it that Feketa started delivering the mail while waiting for a letter from his parents.

In the center of town across from the library one will find a local museum which highlights the history of the vast array of ethnographic groups and one of the displays of vyshyvanki (embroidery) in Zakarpattia.

== Notable people ==
- Athanasius Pekar, Ukrainian Catholic scholar in the United States

== Gallery ==
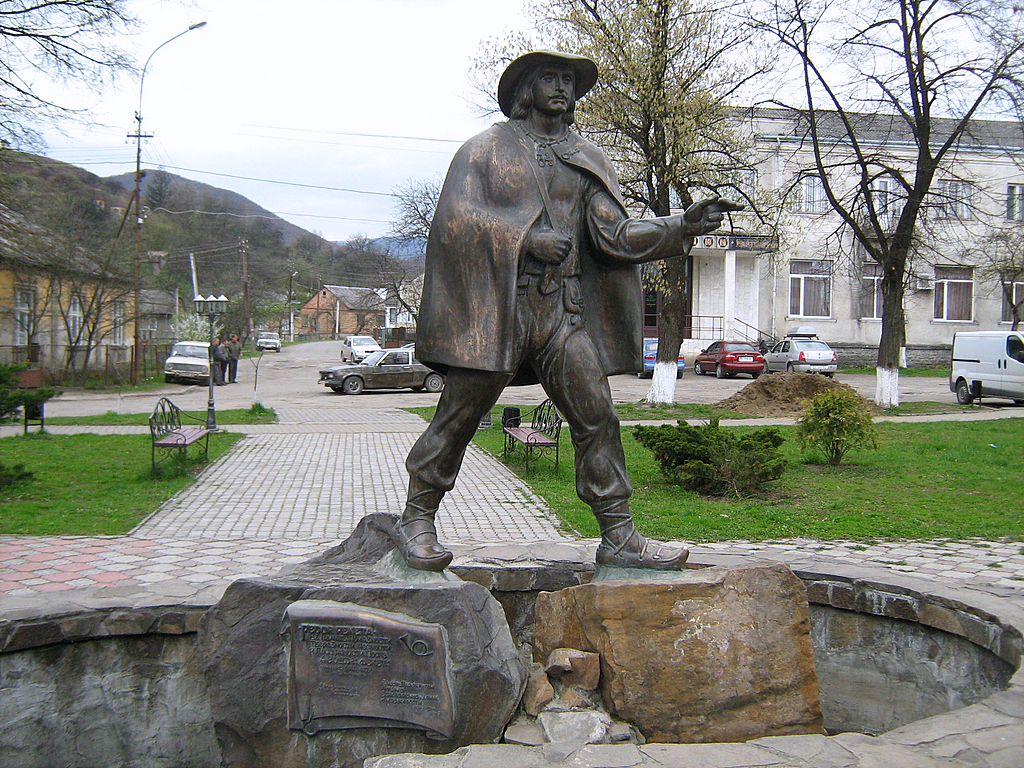
Fedir Feketa monument

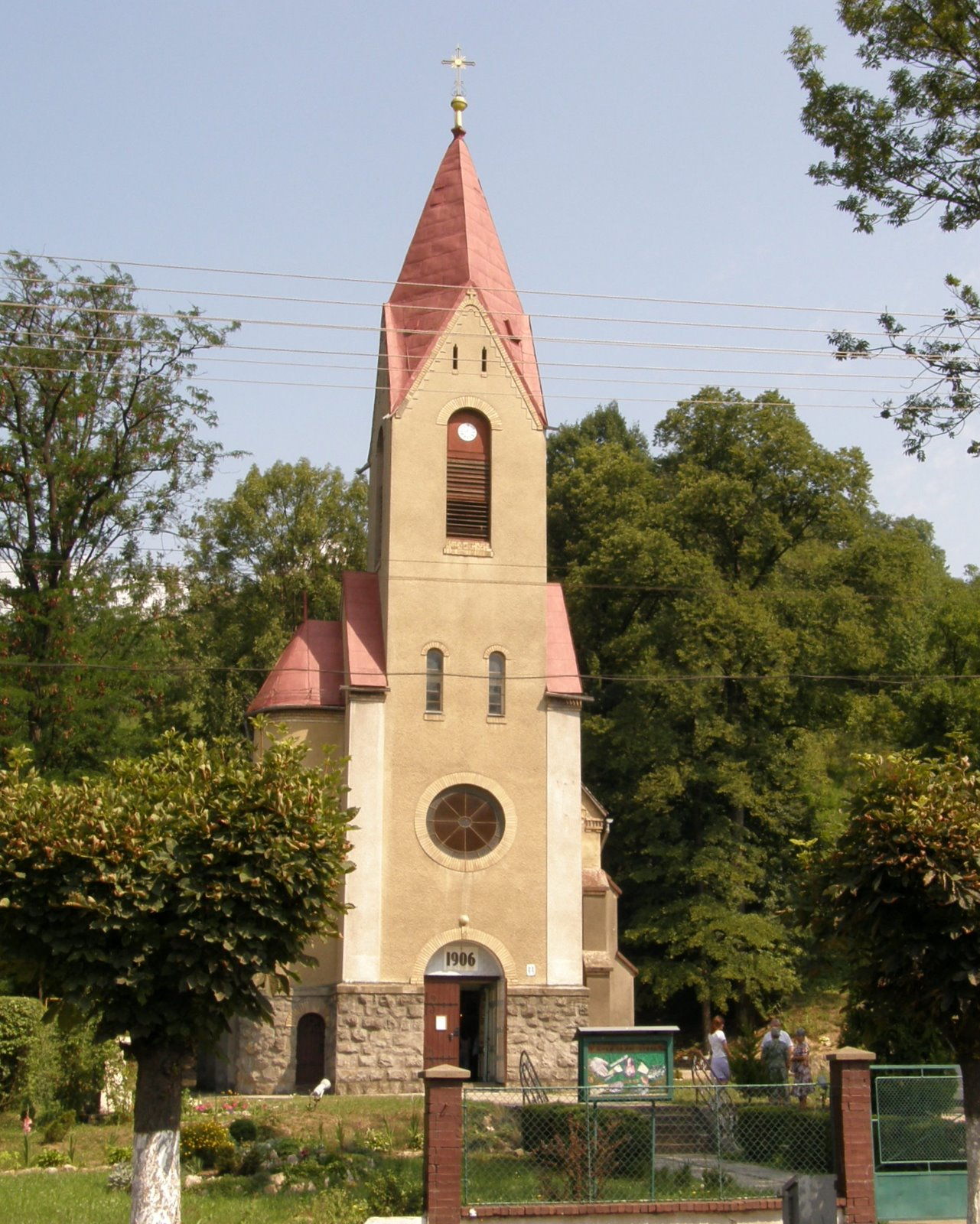
St. Augustin Catholic Church

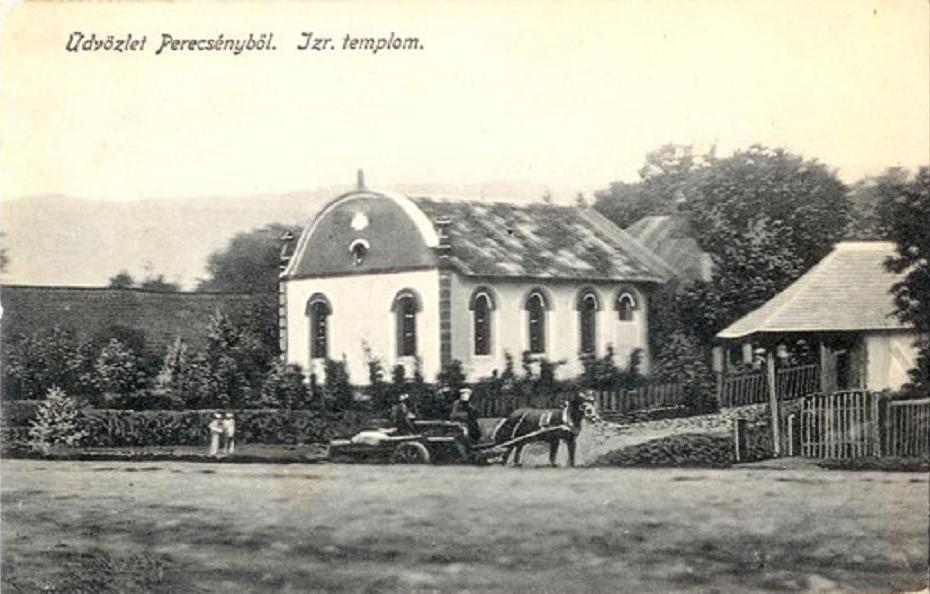
Synagogue in 1900s

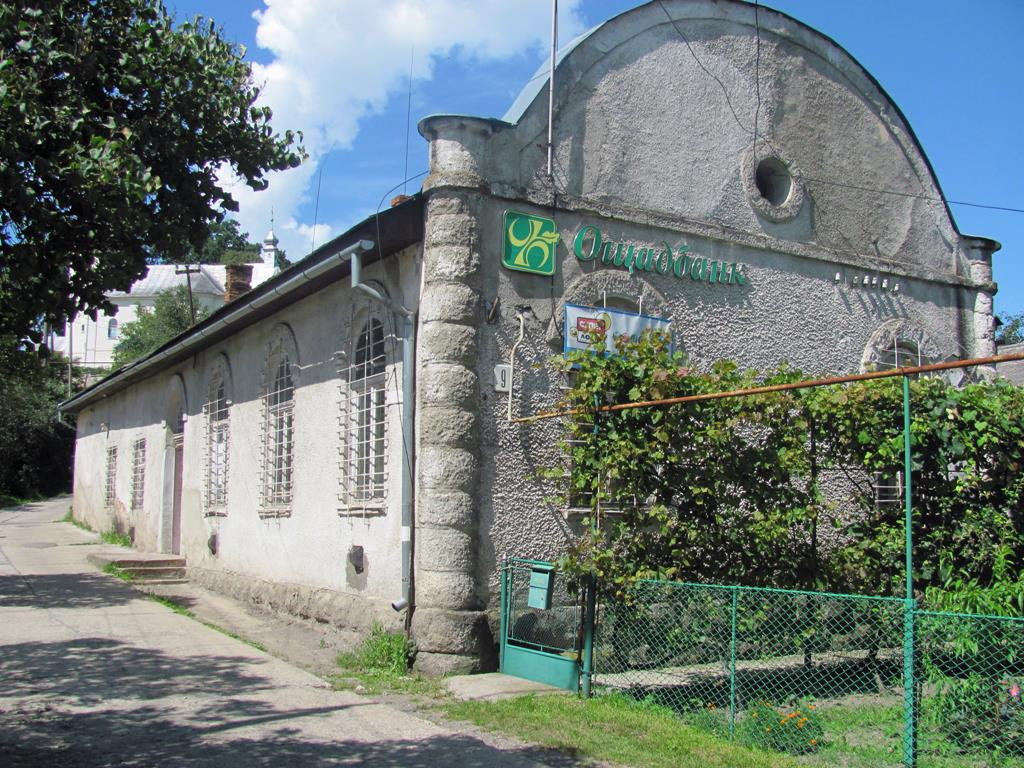
Synagogue today
