= Esen, Ukraine =

Esen Есень (Ukrainian) Eszeny (Hungarian)
- Village
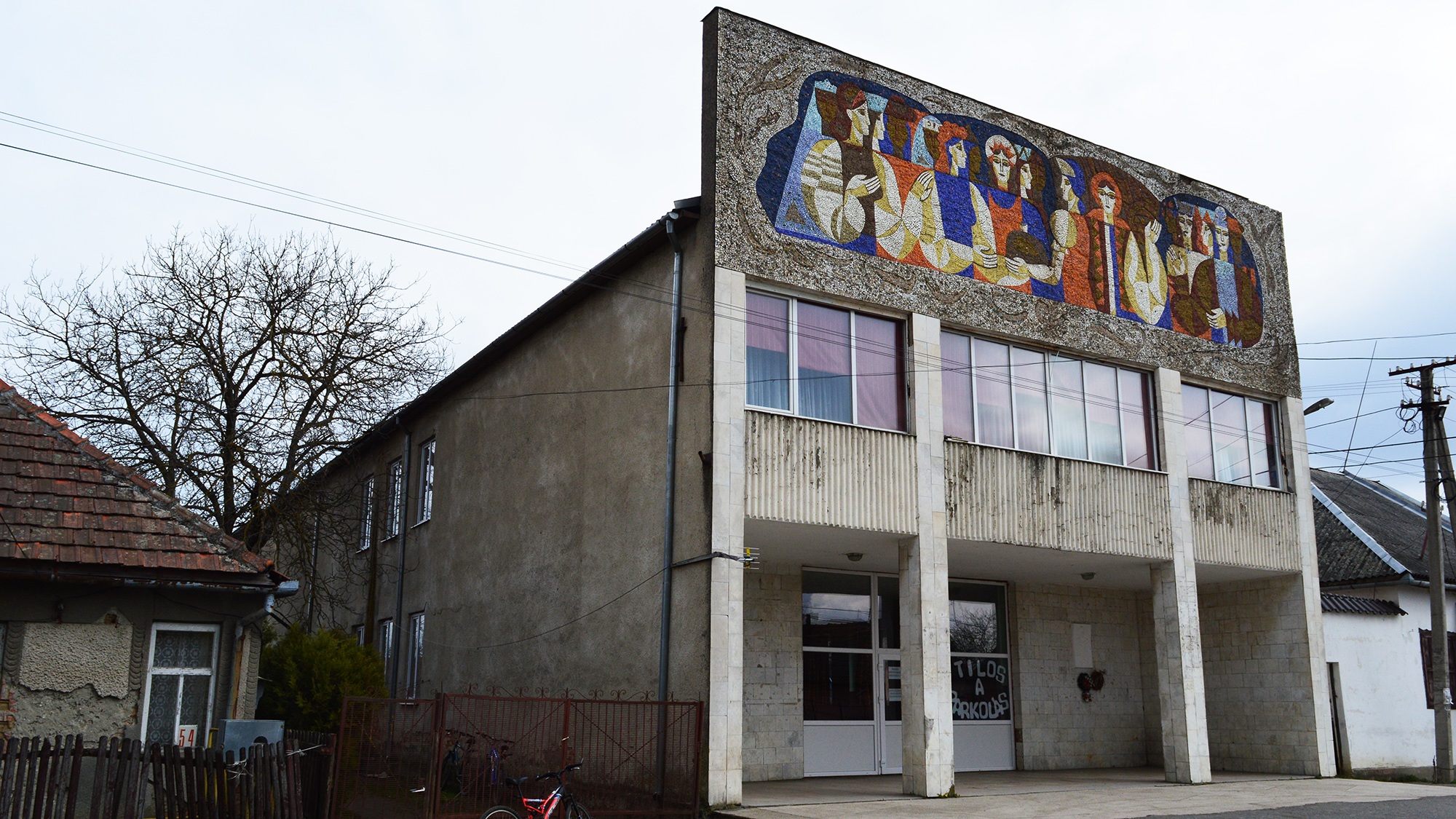

- Location within Ukraine Location within Zakarpattia Oblast
- Coordinates: 48°23′34″N 22°16′23″E
- Country: Ukraine
- Oblast: Zakarpattia Oblast
- Raion: Uzhhorod Raion
- Hromada: Chop urban hromada
- Established: 1470

Government
  - Chairman of the Village Council: Ferents Kovach (Independent)

Area
  - Total: 0,032 km^{2} (12 sq mi)

Population (2001)
  - Total: 1,677
  - Density: 52/km^{2} (140/sq mi)
- Time zone: UTC+2 (EET)
  - Summer (DST): UTC+3 (EEST)
- Postal code: 89461
- Area code: +380 3127

Esen (Ukrainian: Есень; Hungarian: Eszeny), formerly known as Yavorove (Ukrainian: Яворове; Hungarian: Javorove) is a village in Chop urban hromada of Uzhhorod Raion (district) of Zakarpattia Oblast (province) in Western Ukraine.

== History ==
The first written mention of the settlement dates back to 1248.

Ladislaus IV of Hungary transferred Esen to the ownership of the Hungarian clan Baksa. Simon Baksa built an earthen castle with wooden fortifications, under the protection of which the village developed.

In 1270 the village was called Ezen, in 1414 Kysezen.

After the Tatar invasion, a fortified fortress was built there, which was probably destroyed after 1676.

According to the Ukrainian parliament, founded in 1470.

In 1946–1991 was named Yavorove.

== Demographics ==
In January 1989 the population was 1762 people: 864 men and 898 women.

It has a population of 1,677 according to the 2001 census. Native language of the population of the village as of the census:

- Hungarian: 1,636 - 97.56%
- Ukrainian: 34 - 2.03%
- Russian: 7 - 0.42%

Estimate 2020 population is 1,819 people.

== Government and politics ==
A village has a Village Council from 18 deputies and the Chairman. Since 2006 Ferents Kovach is the Chairman of the Village Council. As of 2024, all 18 deputies are independent.
