= Velyka Dobron =

Velyka Dobron Велика Добронь Nagydobrony
- Village
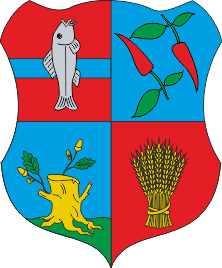
- Coat of arms

- Location within Zakarpattia Oblast Location within Ukraine
- Coordinates: 48°25′5″N 22°23′24″E
- Country: Ukraine
- Oblast: Zakarpattia Oblast
- Raion: Uzhhorod Raion
- Established: 1250

Area
  - Total: 0.39 km^{2} (0.15 sq mi)

Population (2020)
  - Total: 5,607
  - Density: 14,000/km^{2} (37,000/sq mi)
- Time zone: UTC+2 (EET)
  - Summer (DST): UTC+3 (EEST)
- Postal code: 89463
- Area code: +380 0312
- Website: nagydobrony.com.ua

Velyka Dobron (Ukrainian: Велика Добронь, Hungarian: Nagydobrony) is a village in Zakarpattia Oblast (province) of western Ukraine.

== Geography ==
The village is located around 42 km south-east of Uzhhorod, and 23 km west of Mukachevo amongst the rivulets Szernye and Latorica. Administratively, the village belongs to the Uzhhorod Raion, Zakarpattia Oblast. Velika Dobron is located 42 km west of Uzhhorod and 23 km west of Mukachevo, between Szernye stream and Latorica. There are two important roads in the settlement: on the one hand the Chop - Mukachevo highway and on the other hand the Chop - Berehove road. They meet in the center of the village. Neighboring settlements: Mala Dobron 1 km west of the village, Chomonyn 6 km east, Batiovo 10 km. The railway station closest to the settlement is located in Batiovo.

== History ==
There are two known origins of its name:

Because for a long time it was the property of a Dobó, many of whom derive their name from here. Nagydobrony is surrounded by oak forests, which the Russian (Slavic) failed to do, and others derive their name from it.

The area around Nagydobrony was probably a lacquer in the Bronze and Iron Ages. They found the best first ancient find, one of the oldest may be three thousand years old. Bronze hoops, buttons, headbands, glass beads, and a spearhead and a huge specification from underground.

The oral tradition did not preserve the sentence referring to the origin of the village. The locals heard so much from their ancestors in the distance that the first inhabitants settled in a part called Kucsárka, which was protected from attackers in a semicircle of a Hatrác stream. It is not known when this happened and who the first settlers were.

U.S. thinkers believe that a settlement of Bulgarian Pecheneg origin may be of a delivery ballast or if it comes from a post-conquest time. A further overview of the Slavic sound of the name of the village and the influx of Bulgarians between 10 and 1095 lies from the Tisza - Ung - Latorca region.

The village was probably destroyed during the Tartar invasion, although there are no exact data on this. According to the works of Tivadar Lehoczky, the territory of a Tartar and later Bereg county was completely destroyed. History writes this when Csépánfölde, known as Csépántelek, about Kisdobrony: "... his former position called Csépán lies between Dobrony and Ignécz, a one destroyed in 1241 by the Tartars." It is probable that the fate of the Great Drum was uniform with that of the surrounding villages.

So much can be said for sure from the description of Tivadar Lehoczky that Nagydobrony should have already existed at the time of the Tartar invasion. The first contemporary written reminder from 1248 is in a document in the archives of a Leszesz convent called Dobron, which György Györffy questions its origin. Then in 1270 there is a reference to the village with a description of the limit value: “Chepanteluk ... among others Dobron ... et Ogteluk” (i.e. Kisdobrony already lies between Nagydobrony and Tiszaágtelek), this document is kept by the Hungarian National Archives. The settlement in the form of Dobrun (1270), Dubron (1299), Dubrum (1321) appears in some later descriptions.

Already in the 13th century it was a church place, the largest Hungarian-inhabited settlement in Transcarpathia. With typical local folk customs, folk costumes, folk poetry. Collected here by Bartók and Kodály, in 1901 by Endre Ady, who recorded it in his poem.

In 1910, 3,033 inhabitants were 3,027 Hungarians, today 98,8% of their 5607 inhabitants are Hungarian. Before the Treaty of Trianon, Bereg County was a viable accessory for Mezőkaszonyi.

Based on the first Vienna decision, in 1938 and 1945 it was the most important from the point of view of Hungary, at which time it was assigned to this Ung county.

In a World War II method, 152 men from Nagydobrony fell. In November 1944, a Stalinist abducted nearly 300 men, 93 and one died.

The secondary school of the Hungarian language was opened in 1953, the education in the primary school is the Hungarian language.

At the dawn of July 15, 2018, the house of prayer and kindergarten of the Reformed Southern Gypsy Congregation of Nagydobrony was set on fire.

The Good Samaritan Children's Home is located in the village.

== The legend ==
One of the most interesting 20th century legends is associated with Nagydobrony. According to the original version, the village was built well into the II. after the end of World War I, in peacetime, it was bombed by Soviet troops, equated to a land. Not found on any maps today.

The news picked up by Western press propaganda appeared for decades in various sources and references. The reassuring conclusion of the legend could only take place after 1990.

== Population ==
According to the official census from 2016, the population includes 5607 inhabitants of which 90.46% are Hungarians.

== Famous People ==
Joseph Kantor- director and history teacher in Secondary School of Nagydobrony; February 18, 1897, painter Géza Vörös; On March 7, 1944, Endre Hidi is a ceramicist.

== Folk art, folk customs ==
It is the largest Hungarian-inhabited village in Transcarpathia, which preserves its traditions rich in folk customs and costumes. No more folk costumes
