= Storozhnytsia =

Settlement in Zakarpattia Oblast, Ukraine

Storozhnytsia Сторожниця
- Rural settlement
- Location within Zakarpattia Oblast Location within Ukraine
- Coordinates: 48°36′08″N 22°14′34″E
- Country: Ukraine
- Oblast: Zakarpattia Oblast
- Raion: Uzhhorod Raion
- Hromada: Kholmok settlement hromada

Population (2001)
  - Total: 2,623
- Time zone: UTC+2 (EET)
  - Summer (DST): UTC+3 (EEST)
- Postal code: 89421
- Vehicle registration: AO/KO/07

Storozhnytsia (Ukrainian: Сторожниця; Hungarian: Őrdarma; Slovak: Storožnica) is a settlement in the Uzhhorod Raion, Zakarpattia Oblast, western Ukraine. It is adjacent to the regional capital of Uzhhorod.

Before World War I it was a separate city in the Austria-Hungary Empire called Ordarma (or Őhr Darma). Ordarma was a suburb of Ungvar, Hungary which became Uzhhorod. Before 1946, it was known as Yovra (Ukrainian: Йовра; Slovak: Jovra).

== Demographics ==
As of the 2001 Ukrainian census, Storozhnytsia had a population of 2,623 inhabitants. The linguistic composition of the settlement was as follows:

Native languages in Storozhnytsia
	percent
Ukrainian	70.5%
Slovak	18.8%
Hungarian	7.5%
Russian	3.0%
others	0.1%
