= Dolný Štál =

Dolný Štál Alistál
- Municipality
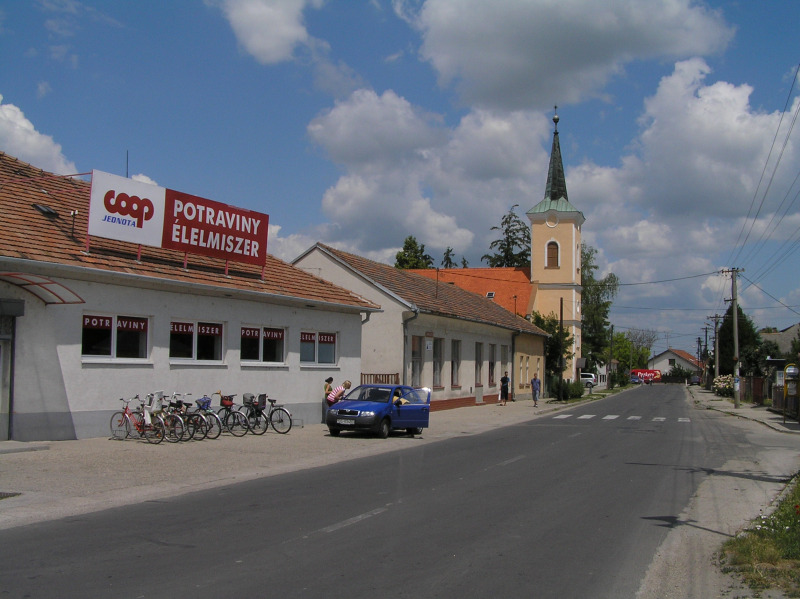

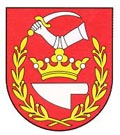
- Flag Coat of arms

- Location of Dolný Štál in the Trnava Region Location of Dolný Štál in Slovakia
- Coordinates: 47.98°N 17.58°E
- Country: Slovakia
- Region: Trnava Region
- District: Dunajská Streda District
- First mentioned: 1254

Government
  - Mayor: Horváth Tamás (Party of the Hungarian Coalition)

Area
  - Total: 29.99 km^{2} (11.58 sq mi)
- Elevation: 112 m (367 ft)

Population (2025)
  - Total: 1,916

Ethnicity
  - Hungarians: 94.19%
  - Slovaks: 5.40%
- Time zone: UTC+1 (CET)
  - Summer (DST): UTC+2 (CEST)
- Postal code: 930 10
- Area code: +421 31
- Vehicle registration plate (until 2022): DS
- Website: dolnystal.eu

Dolný Štál (Hungarian: Alistál, pronounced [ˈɒliʃtaːl]) is a village and municipality in the Dunajská Streda District in the Trnava Region of south-west Slovakia.

== Geography ==
The municipality lies at an altitude of 112 metres (367 ft) and covers an area of 29.99 km^{2} (11.58 sq mi) (2025).

== History ==
In the 9th century, the territory of Dolný Štál became part of the Kingdom of Hungary. In historical records, the village was first mentioned in 1111. Until the end of World War I, it was part of Hungary and fell within the Dunaszerdahely district of Pozsony County. After the Austro-Hungarian army disintegrated in November 1918, Czechoslovak troops occupied the area. After the Treaty of Trianon of 1920, it became officially part of Czechoslovakia and fell within Bratislava County until 1927. In November 1938, the First Vienna Award granted the area to Hungary and it was held by Hungary until 1945. After Soviet occupation in 1945, the Czechoslovak administration returned, and the village became officially part of Czechoslovakia in 1947.

== Population ==
Population statistic (10 years)
Year	1995	2005	2015	2025
Count	1950	1926	1916	1916
Difference		−1.23%	−0.51%	+0%

Population statistic
Year	2024	2025
Count	1928	1916
Difference		−0.62%

It has a population of 1916 people (31 December 2025).

In 1910, the village had 1040, in 1991 the census indicated 1889, while the 2001 census 1962 inhabitants.

=== Ethnicity ===
Census 2021 (1+ %)
Ethnicity	Number	Fraction
Hungarian	1691	88.62%
Slovak	225	11.79%
Not found out	84	4.4%
Total	1908	

In year 2021 was 1908 people by ethnicity 1691 as Hungarian, 225 as Slovak, 84 as Not found out, 5 as Czech, 1 as Ukrainian, 1 as Romani, 1 as German and 1 as Greek.

Note on population: The difference values of population numbers in the table "Population statistic" and in the sections "Ethnicity" & "Religion" is caused by the use of various statistical methods.

=== Religion ===
Census 2021 (1+ %)
Religion	Number	Fraction
Roman Catholic Church	905	47.43%
Calvinist Church	558	29.25%
None	278	14.57%
Not found out	78	4.09%
Evangelical Church	35	1.83%
Greek Catholic Church	26	1.36%
Total	1908	

In year 2021 was 1908 people by religion 905 from Roman Catholic Church, 558 from Calvinist Church, 278 from None, 78 from Not found out, 35 from Evangelical Church, 26 from Greek Catholic Church, 9 from Christian Congregations in Slovakia, 8 from Jehovah's Witnesses, 4 from Other and not ascertained christian church, 3 from Jewish community, 2 from Other, 1 from Islam and 1 from United Methodist Church.

== See also ==
- List of municipalities and towns in Slovakia

== Genealogical resources ==
The records for genealogical research are available at the state archive "Statny Archiv in Bratislava, Slovakia"

- Roman Catholic church records (births/marriages/deaths): 1713-1905 (parish A)
- Lutheran church records (births/marriages/deaths): 1823-1946 (parish B)
- Reformated church records (births/marriages/deaths): 1783-1902 (parish A)
