= Vovkove, Sumy Oblast =

Village in Sumy Oblast, Ukraine

Vovkove Вовкове
- Village
- Location within Sumy Oblast Location within Ukraine
- Coordinates: 50°37′43″N 34°03′55″E
- Country: Ukraine
- Oblast: Sumy Oblast
- Raion: Romny Raion

Population (2001)
  - Total: 16
- Time zone: UTC+2 (EET)
  - Summer (DST): UTC+3 (EEST)

Vovkove (Ukrainian: Вовкове) is a village in Romny Raion of Sumy Oblast in Ukraine. It previously belonged to Lypova Dolyna Raion until it was abolished on 18 July 2020 as part of the administrative reform of Ukraine, which reduced the number of raions of Sumy Oblast to five.

== Demographics ==
Native language as of the Ukrainian Census of 2001:

- Ukrainian 100%
