= Tysaashvan =

Village in Zakarpattia Oblast, Ukraine

- Village
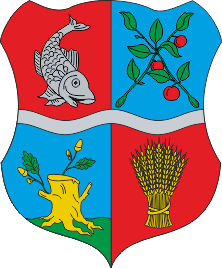
- Coat of arms

- Location within Ukraine Location within Zakarpattia Oblast
- Country: Ukraine
- Oblast: Zakarpattia Oblast
- District: Uzhhorod Raion

Area
  - Total: 210 km^{2} (81 sq mi)

Population
  - Total: 852

Tysaashvan (Ukrainian: Тисаашвань; Hungarian: Tiszaásvány, Ásvány) is a village located in the Uzhhorod Raion (district) in the Zakarpattia Oblast (province) in western Ukraine. It was known as "Minieralnoye" between 1945–1995.

It had a population of 852 according to the 2001 census. 95.7% of the population (815) was Hungarian majority.
