= Solovka =

Solovka Соловка (Ukrainian) Szalóka (Hungarian)
- Village
- Location within Ukraine Location within Zakarpattia Oblast
- Coordinates: 48°22′21″N 22°16′19″E
- Country: Ukraine
- Oblast: Zakarpattia Oblast
- Raion: Uzhhorod Raion
- Hromada: Chop urban hromada
- Established: 1464

Government
  - Chairman of the Village Council: Biro Sándor

Area
  - Total: 0.16 km^{2} (0.062 sq mi)

Population (2001)
  - Total: 896
  - Density: 5,600/km^{2} (15,000/sq mi)
- Time zone: UTC+2 (EET)
  - Summer (DST): UTC+3 (EEST)
- Postal code: 89462
- Area code: +380 312

Solovka (Ukrainian: Соловка, Hungarian: Szalóka) is a village in Chop urban hromada of Uzhhorod Raion (district) of Zakarpattia Oblast (province) in Western Ukraine.

The village's railway station is home to the Solovka border checkpoint on the border with Hungary.

== History ==
The village was first mentioned in a charter dated 1240, and then in 1464 it was referred to as Zalok.

The village was a royal estate in 1240, It presented by Stephen V of Hungary to Mykhailo I of the Rozd dynasty. According to oral tradition, it was a place for rafting across the Tysa River.

Most of the village's population adopted the Reformed faith. The Reformed Church was built in 1783 in the Baroque-Classical style to replace the old stone church.

== Demographics ==
Population according to the 2001 census: 825 people.

Population as of 2020: 896 people.

== Government and politics ==
A village has a Village Council from 16 deputies and the Chairman. Since 2006 Chairman of Village Council is Oleksandr Biro. As of 2024, 14 deputies are independent and 2 are members of Batkivshchyna party.
