= Gyula Juhász (historian) =

Hungarian historian

Gyula Juhász (Bia, September 11, 1930 – Budapest, April 13, 1993) was a Hungarian historian, a member of the Hungarian Academy of Sciences (1985). He was the brother of the Hungarian poet Ferenc Juhász.

Gyula Juhász was born in a peasant family. He graduated from a military school, but in 1956 he left the army protesting against the suppression of the 1956 Revolution. In 1958, he graduated from the Eötvös Loránd University in Budapest with a degree in history. For the following decades, up to 1985 he has been working for the Historical Institute of the Hungarian Academy of Sciences. From 1985 up to his death in 1993 he was the director of National Széchényi Library. In 1985, he was elected to the Hungarian Academy of Sciences.

His main research fields were the general history of the diplomacy, and the Hungarian politics between the World Wars (1930s-1940s). As from 1963 until his death he was teaching history of diplomacy at Marx Károly University of Economics. He served as editor of the Történelmi Szemle (Historical Review) between 1972–1985, and as member of the board of the World Association of the Hungarians after 1986.

Juhász is best known to the general audience by his two books: The Dominant Ideas in Hungary (1983) studied ideas popular with Hungarian intellectuals during World War II, and The War and Hungary 1938-45 (1986) summarizes Hungarian politics during the war.
