= Serednie =

Rural locality in Zakarpattia Oblast, Ukraine

Serednie Середнє
- Rural settlement
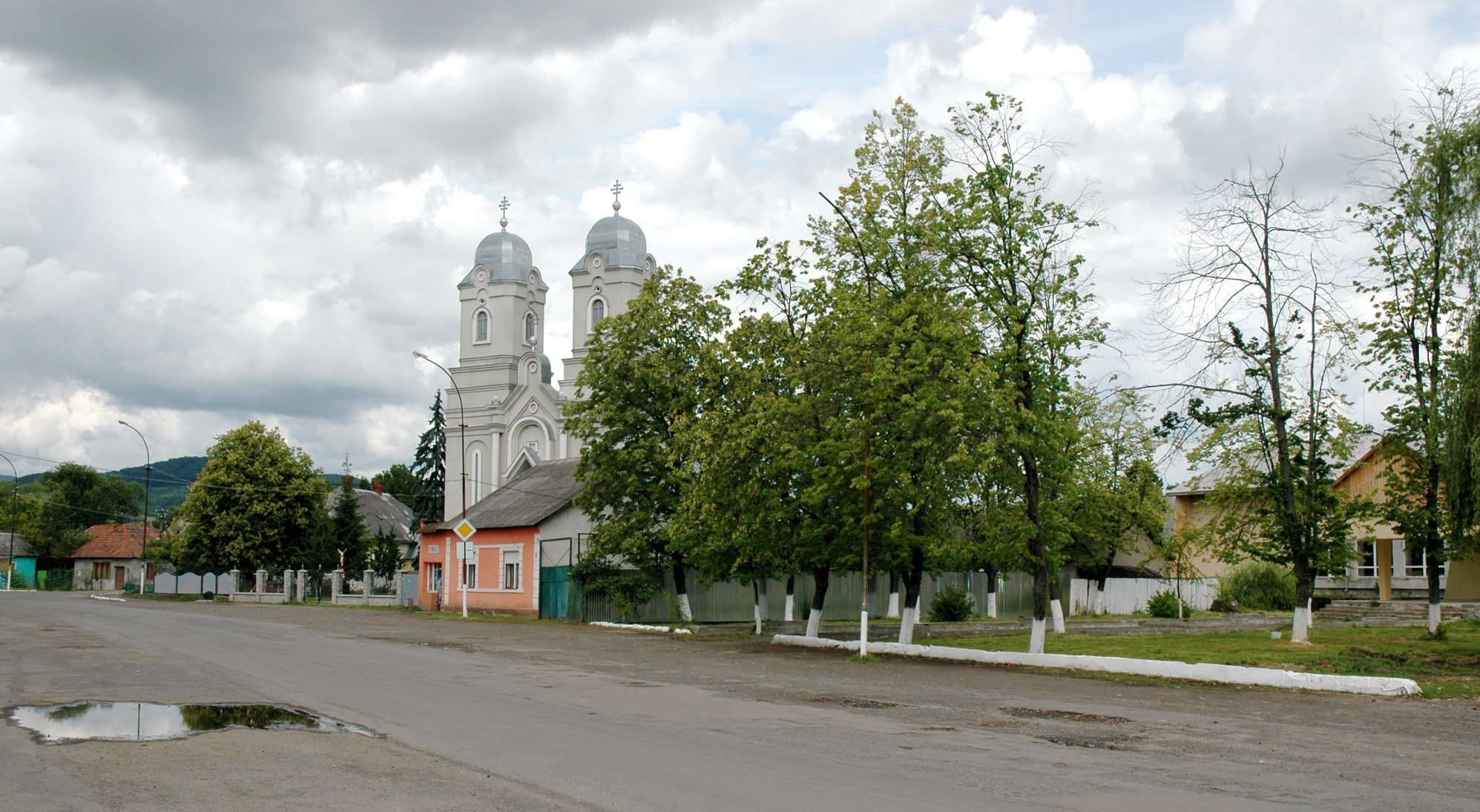
- View of Serednie Center

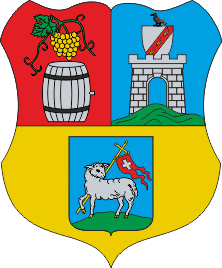
- Coat of arms
- Interactive map of Serednie
- Location of Serednie in Zakarpattia Oblast Location of Serednie in Ukraine
- Coordinates: 48°32′21″N 22°30′44″E
- Country: Ukraine
- Oblast: Zakarpattia Oblast
- Raion: Uzhhorod Raion
- First mentioned: 14th century
- Town status: 1971

Government
  - Town Head: Emerikh Krytskiy

Area
  - Total: 2.38 km^{2} (0.92 sq mi)
- Elevation: 119 m (390 ft)

Population (2022)
  - Total: 4,361
  - Density: 1,830/km^{2} (4,750/sq mi)
- Time zone: UTC+2 (EET)
  - Summer (DST): UTC+3 (EEST)
- Postal code: 89452
- Area code: +380 312
- Website: http://rada.gov.ua/

Serednie (Ukrainian: Середнє; Hungarian: Szerednye; Slovak: Seredné; Russian: Среднее) is a rural settlement in Uzhhorod Raion, Zakarpattia Oblast, western Ukraine. The town's population was 3,505 as of the 2001 Ukrainian Census. Current population: 4,361 (2022 estimate). Geographically, Serednie is located exactly between the cities of Uzhhorod, the district's administrative center, and Mukacheve.

The village houses the remains of a Romanesque castle. The village itself was first mentioned in the 14th century, although archaeologists have dated the castle back to the 12th century. The castle is said to have been built by the Knights Templar.

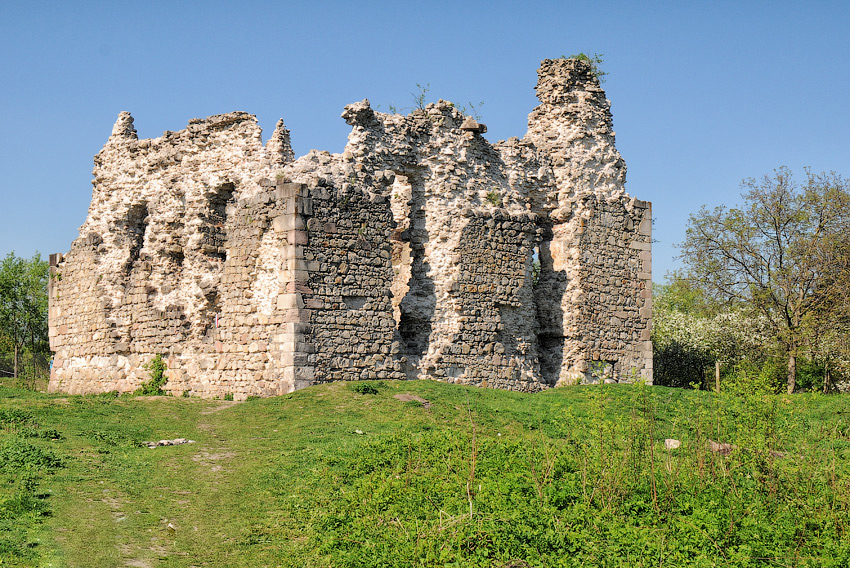
Castle

== History ==
Until 26 January 2024, Serednie was designated urban-type settlement. On this day, a new law entered into force which abolished this status, and Serednie became a rural settlement.
