= Mala Dobron =

- Village
- Location within Zakarpattia Oblast Location within Ukraine
- Coordinates: 48°26′19″N 22°21′18″E
- Country: Ukraine
- Oblast: Zakarpattia Oblast
- Raion: Uzhhorod Raion

Population
  - Total: 1,872

Mala Dobron (Ukrainian: Мала Добронь; Hungarian: Kisdobrony) is a village in Uzhhorod Raion of Zakarpattia Oblast in western Ukraine. It is located 14.2 km (8.8 mi) from the city of Uzhhorod. It had a population of 1,872, according to the 2001 census. Ethnic Hungarians make up a significant majority of the population.

== Population ==
According to the Ukrainian 2001 census, the population of Mala Dobron included:

- Hungarians (98.45%)
- Ukrainians (1.23%)
- Russians (0.05%)
- Moldovans (0.05%)
- Other ethnicities (0.22%)

== Notable residents ==
- Erika Herceg, Hungarian-Ukrainian singer
