= Vovkove, Zakarpattia Oblast =

Village in Zakarpattia Oblast, Ukraine

Vovkove Вовкове
- Village
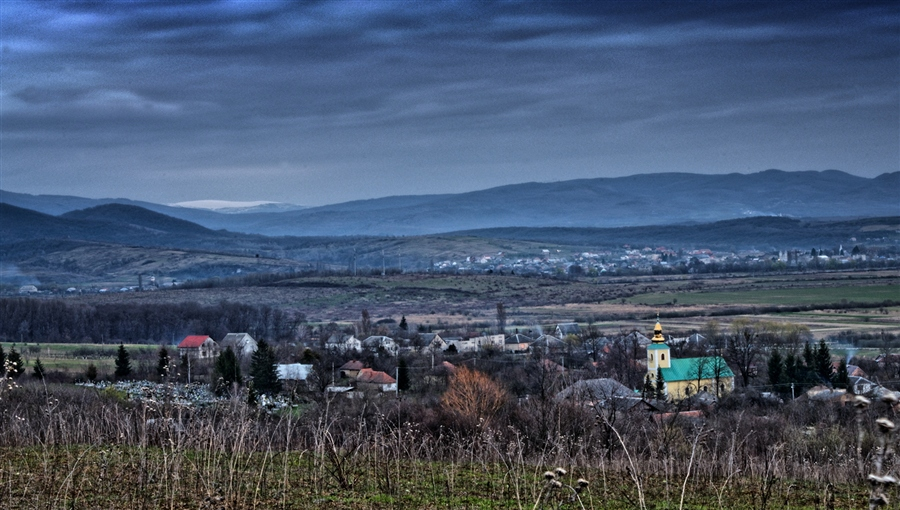

- Location within Zakarpattia Oblast Location within Ukraine
- Coordinates: 48°31′21″N 22°28′13″E
- Country: Ukraine
- Oblast: Zakarpattia Oblast
- Raion: Uzhhorod Raion

Population (2022)
  - Total: 500
- Time zone: UTC+2 (EET)
  - Summer (DST): UTC+3 (EEST)

Vovkove (Ukrainian: Вовкове, Hungarian: Ungordas) is a village in Uzhhorod Raion of Zakarpattia Oblast in Ukraine.

== Demographics ==
Native language as of the Ukrainian Census of 2001:

- Ukrainian 99.41%
- Others 0.39%
