= Uzhhorod Raion =

Subdivision of Zakarpattia Oblast, Ukraine

Coordinates: 48°43′31″N 22°31′41″E

Uzhhorod Raion Ужгородський район
- Raion
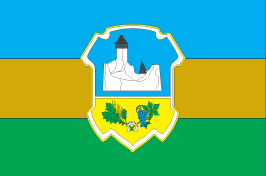
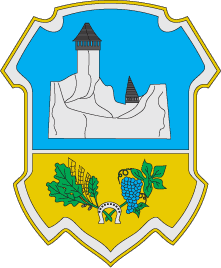
- Flag Coat of arms

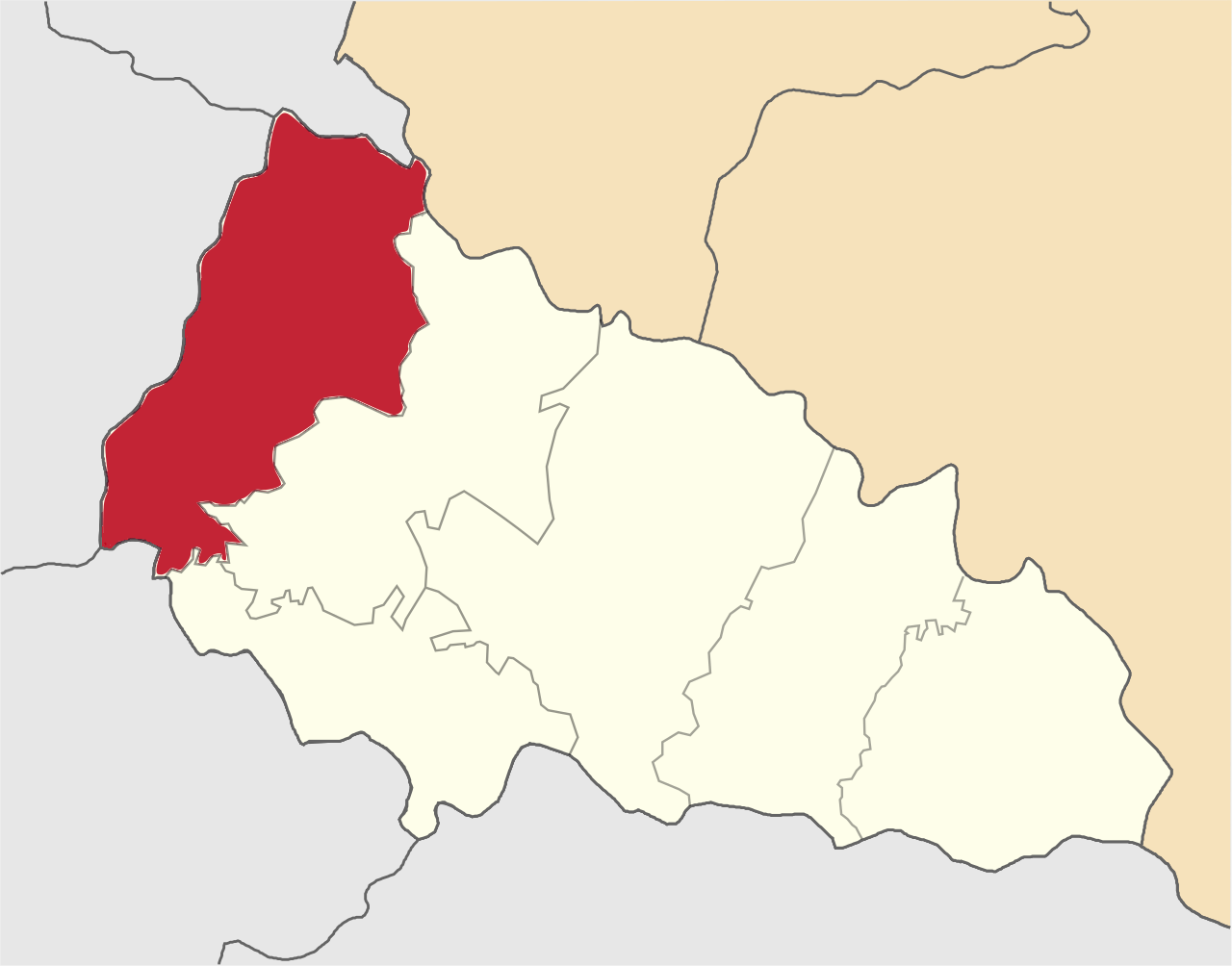
- Country: Ukraine
- Oblast: Zakarpattia
- Admin. center: Uzhhorod
- Subdivisions: 14 hromadas

Area
  - Total: 2,360 km^{2} (910 sq mi)

Population (2022)
  - Total: 255,000
  - Density: 108/km^{2} (280/sq mi)
- Time zone: UTC+02:00 (EET)
  - Summer (DST): UTC+03:00 (EEST)
- Postal index: 88000
- Area code: 380-XXXX
- Website: rada-uzhgorod.gov.ua

Uzhhorod Raion (Ukrainian: Ужгородський район; Hungarian: Ungvári járás) is one of the raions (districts) of Zakarpattia Oblast in western Ukraine. Its administrative center is located in the city of Uzhhorod. Over 30% of population in the raion speak the Hungarian language according to the latest census. Population: 255,000 (2022 estimate).

On 18 July 2020, as part of the administrative reform of Ukraine, the number of raions of Zakarpattia Oblast was reduced to six, and the area of Uzhhorod Raion was significantly expanded. The January 2020 estimate of the raion population was 71,640 (2020 est.).

Some Romanians live in this raion. They live more precisely in the area of Poroshkovo and are known in Romanian as volohi.

== Names ==
There are several alternative names used for this raion: Hungarian: Ungvári járás, Slovak: Užhorodský rajón, German: Rajon Uschhorod, Romanian: Raionul Ujhorod, Rusyn: Ужгородьскый район, Russian: Ужгородский район.

== Administrative divisions ==
The raion contains 14 hromadas:

- Baranyntsi rural hromada, with its center in Baranyntsi
- Velykyi Bereznyi settlement hromada, with its center in Velykyi Bereznyi
- Velyka Dobron rural hromada, with its center in Velyka Dobron
- Dubrynychi-Maliy Bereznyi rural hromada, with its center in Dubrynychi
- Kostryna rural hromada, with its center in Kostryna
- Onokivtsi rural hromada, with its center in Onokivtsi
- Perechyn urban hromada, with its center in Perechyn
- Serednie settlement hromada, with its center in Serednie
- Stavne rural hromada, with its center in Stavne
- Siurte rural hromada, with its center in Siurte
- Turi Remety rural hromada, with its center in Turi Remety
- Kholmok rural hromada, with its center in Kholmok
- Chop urban hromada, with its center in Chop
- Uzhhorod urban hromada, coterminous with the city Uzhhorod

== See also ==
- Administrative divisions of Zakarpattia Oblast
