= List of villages in Zakarpattia Oblast =

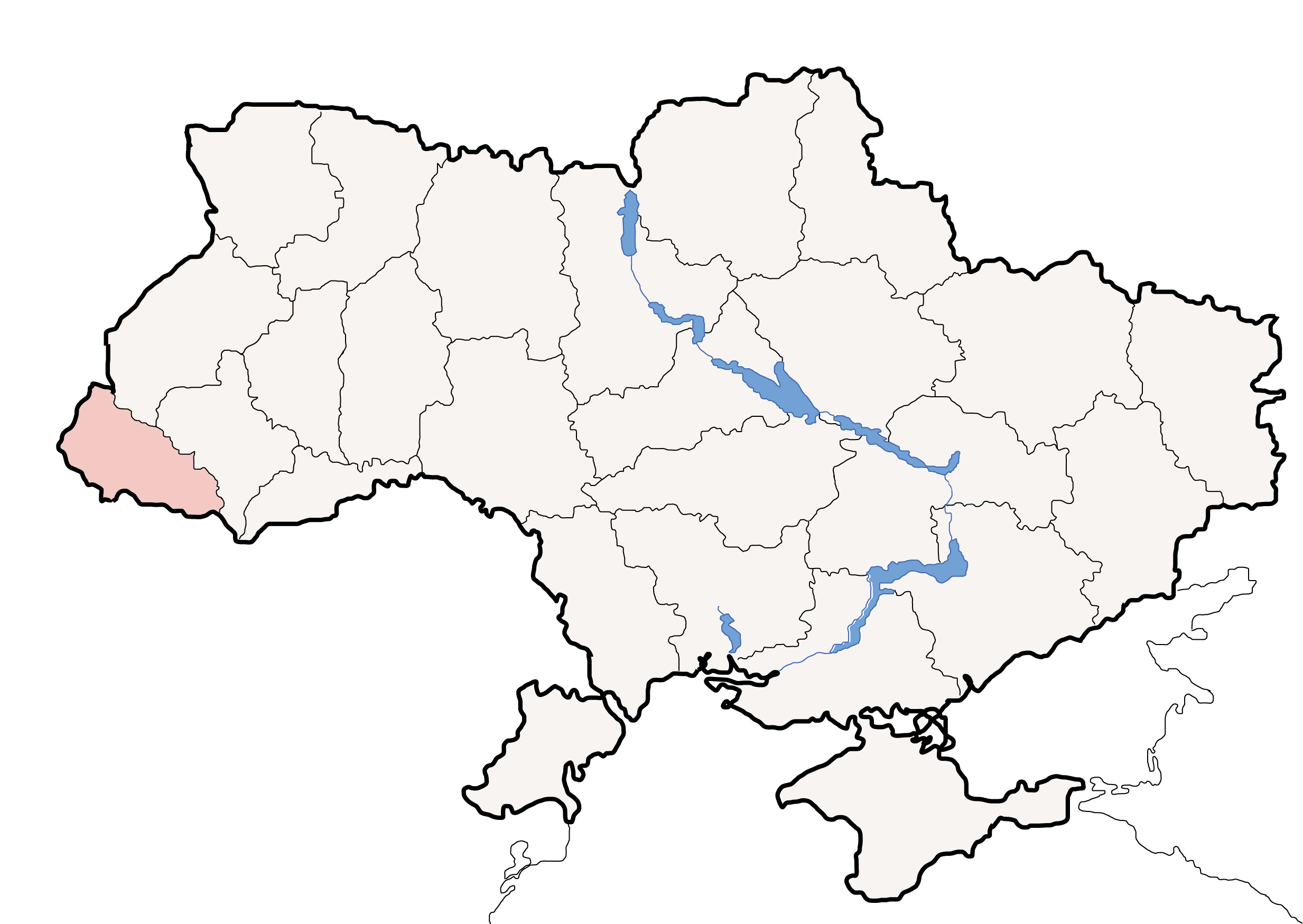
Map of the Zakarpattia Oblast.

The following is a list of villages in Zakarpattia Oblast in Ukraine.

== Berehove Raion (Берегівський район) ==
Name	Name (Ukrainian)	Population (2001)
Ardanovo	Арданово	1,615
Astei	Астей	672
Badalovo	Бадалово	1,712
Badiv	Бадів	549
Bakosh	Бакош	988
Balazher	Балажер	816
Barkasovo	Баркасово	2,236
Batrad	Батрадь	1,792
Bene	Бене	1,408
Berehuifalu	Берегуйфалу	1,925
Boharevytsia	Богаревиця	513
Borzhava	Боржава	1,501
Borzhavske	Боржавське	2,903
Botar	Ботар	913
Bukove	Букове	2,139
Chepa	Чепа	1,943
Cherna	Черна	2,187
Chetfalva	Четфалва	754
Choma	Чома	916
Chornotysiv	Чорнотисів	2,230
Chornyi Potik	Чорний Потік	1,073
Chykosh-Horodna	Чикош-Городна	80
Danylivka	Данилівка	489
Diula	Дюла	1,421
Drotyntsi	Дротинці	1,960
Dunkovytsia	Дунковиця	815
Dyida	Дийда	2,013
Fanchykovo	Фанчиково	2,037
Fertesholmash	Фертешолмаш	1,027
Forholan	Форголан	866
Halabor	Галабор	749
Hat	Гать	3,081
Hecha	Геча	1,030
Heten	Гетен	761
Hetynia	Гетиня	753
Horbky	Горбки	615
Horonhlab	Горонглаб	774
Hudia	Гудя	573
Huniadi	Гуняді	324
Hut	Гут	1,349
Kamianske	Кам’янське	1,482
Karachyn	Карачин	389
Kashtanovo	Каштаново	262
Khmilnyk	Хмільник	866
Kholomovets	Холомовець	714
Khyzha	Хижа	1,673
Kidiosh	Кідьош	893
Koson	Косонь	2,338
Kvasovo	Квасово	898
Mala Byihan	Мала Бийгань	1,300
Mala Kopania	Мала Копаня	1,345
Male Popovo	Мале Попово	210
Matiiovo	Матійово	1,069
Mizhlisne (formerly Pushkino)	Міжлісне (Пушкіно)	1,409
Mochola	Мочола	675
Muzhiievo	Мужієво	2,086
Nevetlenfolu	Неветленфолну	1,595
Nove Klynove	Нове Клинове	313
Nove Selo	Нове Село	1,856
Novoselytsia	Новоселиця	1,412
Nyzhni Remety	Нижні Ремети	865
Okli	Оклі	364
Okli Hed	Оклі Гедь	610
Oleshnyk	Олешник	4,644
Onok	Онок	3,081
Orosiievo	Оросієво	895
Perekhrestia	Перехрестя	918
Pidvynohradiv	Підвиноградів	4,368
Popovo	Попово	928
Prytysianske	Притисянське	124
Pyiterfolvo	Пийтерфолво	2,064
Rafainovo	Рафайново	973
Ruska Dolyna	Руська Долина	440
Sasovo	Сасово	2,283
Serne (formerly Sernyn, then Rivne)	Серне (Сернин, Рівне)	1,979
Shalanky	Шаланки	3,110
Shom	Шом	1,091
Shyroke	Широке	2,140
Siltse	Сільце	3,112
Svoboda	Свобода	853
Tekovo	Теково	1,533
Trosnyk	Тросник	2,204
Tysobyken	Тисобикень	2,191
Vary	Вари	3,114
Velyka Bakta	Велика Бакта	1,022
Velyka Byihan	Велика Бийгань	1,893
Velyka Kopania	Велика Копаня	3,428
Velyka Palad	Велика Паладь	1,823
Velyki Berehy	Великі Береги	2,545
Velyki Komiaty	Великі Ком’яти	1,893
Verbove	Вербове	22
Verbovets	Вербовець	1,188
Veriatysia	Верятися	2,024
Verkhni Remety	Верхні Ремети	478
Volovytsia	Воловиця	860
Yanoshi	Яноші	2,026
Zapson	Запсонь	1,799
Zatyshne	Затишне	500
Zatysivka	Затисівка	528

== Khust Raion (Хустський район) ==
- Berehy
- Berezovo
- Bilky
- Boroniava
- Bukovets
- Danylovo
- Lypetska Poliana
- Hontsosh
- Horinchovo
- Iza
- Sokyrnytsia
- Synevyr
- Synevyrska Poliana
- Verkhnii Bystryi
- Verkhnii Studenyi
- Veliatyno
- Velykyi Rakovets
- Vertep
- Vilshany
- Zaberezh
- Zolotarovo

== Mukachevo Raion (Мукачівський район) ==
- Abranka
- Babychi
- Barbovo
- Barkasovo
- Benedykivtsi
- Bereznyky
- Berezynka
- Bilasovytsia
- Bukovets
- Hankovytsia
- Holubyne
- Kuzmyno
- Nove Davydkovo
- Obava
- Pavshino
- Pavlovo
- Polyana
- Nyzhni Vorota
- Uklyn
- Vovchyy

== Rakhiv Raion (Рахівський район) ==
- Bila Tserkva
- Bilyn
- Hoverla

== Tiachiv Raion (Тячівський район) ==
Name	Name (Ukrainian)	Population (2001)
Bedevlia	Бедевля	3,971
Bila Tserkva	Біла Церква	3,029
Bilovartsi	Біловарці	992
Bobove	Бобове	198
Brustury (Formerly Lopukhiv)	Брустури (Лопухів)	3,323
Chumaliovo	Чумальово	2,667
Dibrivka	Дібрівка	440
Dobrianske	Добрянське	2714
Dobrik	Добрік	1,105
Dulovo	Дулово	2,420
Fontyniasy	Фонтиняси	655
Hanychi	Ганичі	3,984
Hlybokyi Potik	Глибокий Потік	5,531
Hlynanyi	Глиняний	301
Hrunyky	Груники	1,416
Hrushovo	Грушово	5,890
Kalyny	Калини	5,844
Kolodne	Колодне	2,119
Krasna	Красна	2,587
Krychovo	Кричово	2,719
Kryva	Крива	3,023
Lazy	Лази	3,801
Mala Uholka	Мала Уголька	1,495
Neresnytsia	Нересниця	3,757
Nimetska Mokra	Німецька Мокра	540
Novobarovo	Новобарово	2,007
Novoselytsia	Новоселиця	3,120
Nyzhnia Apsha (Formerly Dibrova)	Нижня Апша (Діброва)	7,252
Nyzhnii Dubovets	Нижній Дубовець	1,091
Okruhla	Округла	573
Pechera	Печера (Пещера)	104
Petrushiv	Петрушів	2,687
Pidplesha	Підплеша	1,235
Podishor	Подішор	1,183
Pryhid	Пригідь	663
Rakove	Ракове	968
Rivne	Рівне	367
Rososh	Росош	344
Runia	Руня	678
Ruska Mokra	Руська Мокра	1,357
Ruske Pole	Руське Поле	4,344
Sasovo	Сасово	426
Serednie Vodiane	Середнє Водяне	5,676
Shyrokyi Luh	Широкий Луг	1,964
Tarasivka	Тарасівка	3,066
Tereblia	Теребля	3,712
Ternovo	Терново	4,303
Tiachivka	Тячівка	1,553
Tysalovo	Тисалово	1,281
Uhlia	Угля	3,115
Velyka Uholka	Велика Уголька	2,025
Vilkhivchyk	Вільхівчик	1,440
Vilkhivtsi	Вільхівці	3,371
Vilkhivtsi Lazy	Вільхівці Лази	3,214
Vonihove	Вонігове	2,651
Vyshnii Dubovets	Вишній Дубовець	714
Vyshovatyi	Вишоватий	1,804

== Uzhhorod Raion (Ужгородський район) ==
- Andriivka
- Antalovtsi
- Behendiatska Pastil
- Bukivtsovo
- Chornoholova
- Dubrynychi
- Husnyi
- Kostryna
- Liuta
- Solomonovo
- Storozhnytsia
- Tysaashvan
- Uzhok
- Verhovyna-Bystra
- Vilshynky
- Volosianka
- Vorochovo
- Vyshka
- Zavbuch
- Zarichovo
