= Bukovets =

Bukovets may refer to:

== Bulgaria ==
- Bukovets, Montana Province, a village in Brusartsi Municipality, Montana Province
- Bukovets, Sofia Province, a village in Svoge municipality, Sofia Province
- Bukovets, Veliko Tarnovo Province, a village in Veliko Tarnovo municipality, Veliko Tarnovo Province
- Bukovets, Vidin Province, a village in Vidin Municipality, Vidin Province
- Bukovets, Vratsa Province, a village in Byala Slatina Municipality, Vidin Province

== Ukraine ==
- Bukovets, Kalush Raion, Ivano-Frankivsk Oblast, a village in Kalush Raion, Ivano-Frankivsk Oblast
- Bukovets, Mizhhirya Raion, a village in Zakarpattia Oblast
- Bukovets, Verkhovyna Raion, Ivano-Frankivsk Oblast, a commune in Verkhovyna Raion, Ivano-Frankivsk Oblast
- Bukovets, Volovets Raion, a village in Zakarpattia Oblast
- Bukovets pass, a mountain pass in the Carpathians

== See also ==
- Bukovec (disambiguation)
- Bukowiec (disambiguation)
- Bukovac (disambiguation)
- Bucovăț (disambiguation)
