= Highway M25 (Ukraine) =

Highway in Ukraine

Highway M25
- Автошлях М25

Route information
- Length: 59.6 km (37.0 mi)
- Existed: 2013–present

Major junctions
- East end: M 24 at Yanoshi
- West end: M 06 near Solomonovo

Location
- Country: Ukraine
- Oblasts: Zakarpattia

Highway system
- Roads in Ukraine; State Highways
← M 24	→ M 26

M25 is a Ukrainian international highway (M-highway) connecting the western village of Solomonovo near Chop to the southern village of Yanoshi. The route stretches along the border with Hungary and Tisza River.

== Route ==
The route starts at the highway interchange located between village of Solomonove and Chop train station. To the west through Solomonove a local street continues on to the Slovak town of Čierna nad Tisou.

Marker	Main settlements	Notes	Highway Interchanges
0 km	Solomonovo	Eurocar	E573 M 06
	Chop	Chop train station	
	Velyka Dobron	sharp turn to Batiove	T-07-10
	Batiovo	Batiove train station	
	Shom	towards Hungary-Ukraine border	T-07-14
	Zapson	spurs to Hungary-Ukraine border	M 25 spurs to Kosyno
59.6 km	Yanoshi	at a village center	E58/ E81 M 24

== See also ==
- Roads in Ukraine
- Ukraine Highways
- International E-road network
- Hungary-Ukraine border
