= Bukovac =

Bukovac (Serbian Cyrillic: Буковац) may refer to:

== People ==
- Tom Bukovac (born 1968), American musician and producer
- Vlaho Bukovac (1855–1922), Croatian painter

== Places ==
=== Bosnia and Herzegovina ===
- Bukovac (Brčko), a village in Brčko District
- Bukovac, Derventa, a village in Derventa municipality
- Bukovac (Doboj), a village in Doboj municipality
- Bukovac (Gradiška), a village in Gradiška municipality, Republika Srpska

=== Croatia ===
- Bukovac, Maksimir, a neighborhood in Zagreb
- Bukovac Perjasički, a village in Karlovac County
- Bukovac Perušićki, a village in Perušić
- Bukovac Svetojanski, a village in Zagreb County

=== Montenegro ===
- Bukovac, Plužine, a village in Plužine

=== Serbia ===
- Bukovac, Despotovac, a village in Despotovac
- Bukovac (Mionica), a village
- Bukovac, Novi Sad, a village near Novi Sad
- Bukovac, Preševo, a village
- Bukovački Salaši, a suburban settlement near Sombor
- Bukovac palace, a building in Zrenjanin

== See also ==
- Bucovăț (disambiguation)
- Bukovče (disambiguation)
- Bukovec (disambiguation)
- Bukovets (disambiguation)
