= Highway M24 (Ukraine) =

Highway in Ukraine

Highway M24
- Автошлях М24

Route information
- Part of E58 E81
- Length: 37.5 km (23.3 mi)
- Existed: 2013–present

Major junctions
- East end: M 06 near Mukacheve
- West end: Hungarian border near Astei

Location
- Country: Ukraine
- Oblasts: Zakarpattia

Highway system
- Roads in Ukraine; State Highways
← M 23	→ M 25

Highway M24 is a Ukrainian international highway (M-highway) connecting the city of Mukacheve to the southern village of Astei on the border with Hungary. The route is relatively short and located entirely within Zakarpattia.

Throughout most of its length on a segment between Mukacheve and Berehove, it is part of European routes European route E58 and European route E81. Before 2013 it was designated as P54.

== Route ==
Marker	Main settlements	Notes	Highway Interchanges
0 km	Mukacheve	city's loop route • Palanok Castle	(vulytsia Avtomobilistiv) • M 06
	Pavshyno	Zakarpat-Naftoprodukt	T0739
	Mukacheve Airport	Dnepr radar	
	Yanoshi		M 25
	Berehove	thru city	M 23
33.3 km	Luzhanka	Beregsurany-Astei	Hungary-Ukraine border

== See also ==
- Roads in Ukraine
- Ukraine Highways
- International E-road network
- Hungary-Ukraine border
