= Badiv =

Badiv Бадів
- Village
- Location within Zakarpattia Oblast
- Coordinates: 48°21′13″N 22°21′20″E
- Country: Ukraine
- Oblast: Zakarpattia Oblast
- Raion: Berehove Raion

Population (2001)
  - Total: 546

Badiv (Ukrainian: Бадів, Hungarian: Badótanya, Rusyn: Бодов) is a village in the Berehove Raion of Zakarpattia Oblast, Ukraine. As of 2001, its population was 546.

== See also ==
- List of villages in Zakarpattia Oblast
