= Luzhanka (border checkpoint) =

Locaiton
- Country: Ukraine
- Location: Astei, Berehove Raion, Zakarpattia Oblast
- Coordinates: 48°10′08″N 22°35′51″E

Luzhanka is a land border crossing between Ukraine and Hungary on the Ukrainian side, near the village of Astei, Berehove Raion, Zakarpattia Oblast.

The crossing is situated on autoroute E50 ( M 24). Across the border on the Hungarian side is the checkpoint of Beregsurány on the Szabolcs-Szatmár-Bereg County border and main road 41 in the direction of Nyíregyháza.

The Luzhanka checkpoint, in addition to radiological, customs and border control, may carry out phytosanitary, veterinary, environmental and control of the International Road Transport Service. It is part of the Vynohradiv customs post at the Chop customs. The code of the checkpoint is 30507 16 00 (11).

== See also ==
- Hungary–Ukraine border
- State Border of Ukraine
- Highway M24 (Ukraine)
