= Badalovo =

- Village
- Interactive map of Badalovo
- Location within Zakarpattia Oblast Location within Ukraine
- Coordinates: 48°6′35″N 22°38′9″E
- Country: Ukraine
- Oblast: Zakarpattia Oblast
- Raion: Berehove Raion

Badalovo (Ukrainian: Бадалово, Hungarian: Badaló) is a village in Zakarpattia Oblast (province) of western Ukraine. It is located on the river bank of Tisza, not far from the Ukrainian-Hungarian border. Administratively, the village belongs to the Berehove Raion, Zakarpattia Oblast. The village was first mentioned as Bodolou in 1226.

== Population ==
In 2002, the population included 1714 inhabitants, of whom 1682 are Hungarians.

== See also ==
- List of villages in Zakarpattia Oblast
