= Mala Byihan =

- Village
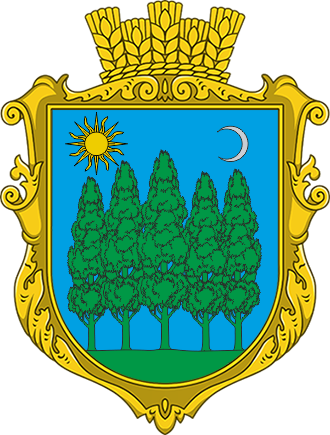
- Coat of arms

- Location within Zakarpattia Oblast
- Coordinates: 48°15′21″N 22°27′19″E
- Country: Ukraine
- Oblast: Zakarpattia Oblast
- Raion: Berehove Raion

Mala Byihan (Ukrainian: Мала Бийгань, Hungarian: Kisbégány) is a village in Zakarpattia Oblast (province) of western Ukraine.

== Geography ==
The village is located northwest of Berehove between Velika Byihan and Balazsér in Hungary. Administratively, the village belongs to the Berehove Raion, Zakarpattia Oblast.

== History ==
It was first mentioned as Bygan in 1332.

== Population ==
According to the official census of 2001, the population included 1,300 inhabitants of whom more than 90% were Hungarians.
