= Astei =

Astei Астей
- Village
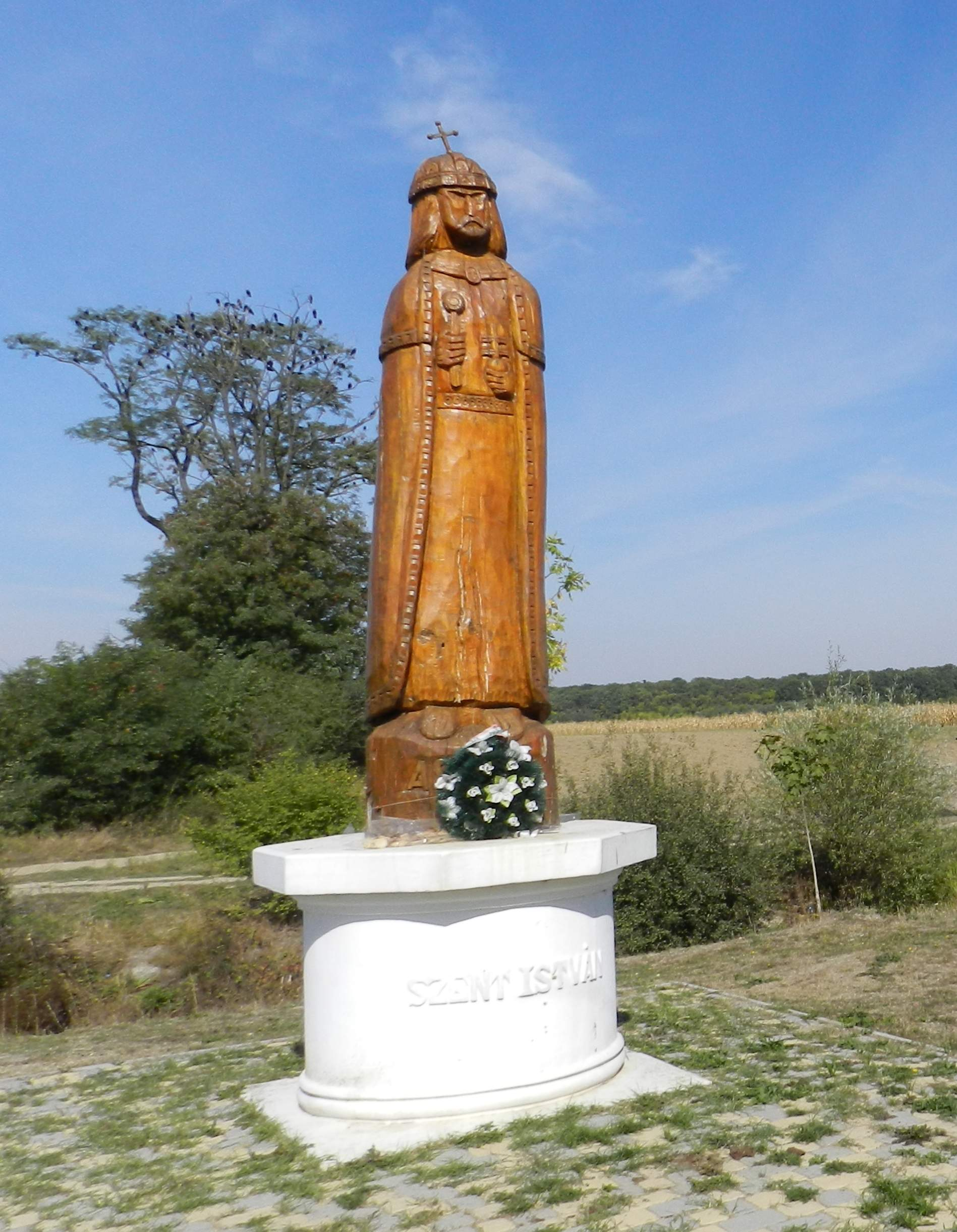

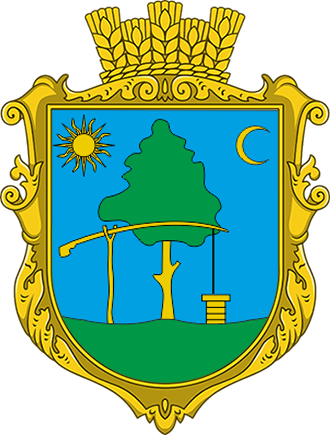
- Coat of arms
- Interactive map of Astei
- Location of Astei Astei (Ukraine)
- Coordinates: 48°10′08″N 22°35′51″E
- Country: Ukraine
- Oblast: Zakarpattia Oblast
- District: Berehove Raion
- Hromada: Velyka Bihan rural hromada
- Elevation: 113 m (371 ft)

Population (2001)
  - Total: 677
- Time zone: UTC+2 (EET)
  - Summer (DST): UTC+3 (EEST)
- Postal code: 90250
- Area code: +380 3141
- Climate: Dfa

Astei (Ukrainian: Астей, Hungarian: Asztély) is a village (a selo) in the Berehove Raion (district) of Zakarpattia Oblast in western Ukraine. It is located 5 km (3.1 mi) from the district center Berehove and is located on Highway M24. In the immediate vicinity of the village is the Luzhanka border checkpoint on the border with Hungary.

== History ==
Astei was first mentioned in 1492. From the 14th to 17th centuries, the village was owned by various feudal lords. In 1566 the village, was subjected to a devastating raid by the Crimean Tatars. In 1946, by decree of the Soviet Ukrainian authorities, the village of Astei was renamed Luzhanka. In 1991, its historic name was restored.
