= Bukowiec =

Bukowiec may refer to:

- Bukovec (Frýdek-Místek District), known in Polish as "Bukowiec", a village in the Czech Republic
- Bukowiec, Chodzież County in Greater Poland Voivodeship (west-central Poland)
- Bukowiec, Czarnków-Trzcianka County in Greater Poland Voivodeship (west-central Poland)
- Bukowiec, Nowy Tomyśl County in Greater Poland Voivodeship (west-central Poland)
- Bukowiec, Wągrowiec County in Greater Poland Voivodeship (west-central Poland)
- Bukowiec, Brodnica County in Kuyavian-Pomeranian Voivodeship (north-central Poland)
- Bukowiec, Grudziądz County in Kuyavian-Pomeranian Voivodeship (north-central Poland)
- Bukowiec, Świecie County in Kuyavian-Pomeranian Voivodeship (north-central Poland)
- Bukowiec, Lesser Poland Voivodeship (south Poland)
- Bukowiec, Łódź East County in Łódź Voivodeship (central Poland)
- Bukowiec, Sieradz County in Łódź Voivodeship (central Poland)
- Bukowiec, Gmina Żelechlinek, Tomaszów County in Łódź Voivodeship (central Poland)
- Bukowiec, Karkonosze County in Lower Silesian Voivodeship (south-west Poland)
- Bukowiec, Trzebnica County in Lower Silesian Voivodeship (south-west Poland)
- Bukowiec, Lublin Voivodeship (east Poland)
- Bukowiec, Lubusz Voivodeship (west Poland)
- Bukowiec, Pomeranian Voivodeship (north Poland)
- Bukowiec, Silesian Voivodeship (south Poland)
- Bukowiec, Bieszczady County in Subcarpathian Voivodeship (south-east Poland)
- Bukowiec, Kolbuszowa County in Subcarpathian Voivodeship (south-east Poland)
- Bukowiec, Lesko County in Subcarpathian Voivodeship (south-east Poland)
- Bukowiec, Bartoszyce County in Warmian-Masurian Voivodeship (north Poland)
- Bukowiec, Iława County in Warmian-Masurian Voivodeship (north Poland)

== See also ==
- Bukovec (disambiguation)
- Bukovets (disambiguation)
