= Vorochovo =

Village in Zakarpattia Oblast, Ukraine

Vorochovo (Ukrainian: Ворочово) is a village in the Perechyn Raion, Zakarpattia Oblast, Ukraine. It was a part of the Kingdom of Hungary in the Ung megye in the Berezna járás, until it was split in two, with the village being a part of the new Perecseny járás. This village is also known by the following names:

- Vorocsó
- Kapuszög

These alternate names may still be found today are among passenger ship records from Europe to the United States. A quick search on websites such as ancestry.com or familysearch.org will yield those immigrants whose last residence before boarding were this village.

Vorochovo is located at roughly the latitude and longitude of 48.7167°N, 22.4500°E and located about 2.5km to the South Southwest from Perechyn (Perecseny) and about 18.6km to the North Northeast from Uzhhorod.

The region has a strong Rusyn (Ruthenian) heritage, stemming from a history of Eastern Slavic settlers.
