= Balazher =

- Village
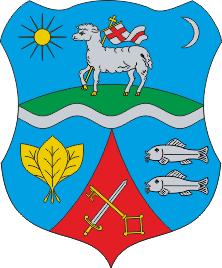
- Coat of arms

- Location within Zakarpattia Oblast
- Coordinates: 48°14′47″N 22°36′31″E
- Country: Ukraine
- Oblast: Zakarpattia Oblast
- Raion: Berehove Raion

Balazher (Ukrainian: Балажер, Hungarian: Balazsér) is a village in Zakarpattia Oblast (province) of western Ukraine.

== Geography ==
The village is located around 7 km east of Berehove. Administratively, the village belongs to the Berehove Raion, Zakarpattia Oblast.

== History ==
The first written mention of the village arose in 1323 as Balasey.

== Population ==
In 2002, the population included inhabitants 816, of whom 737 are ethnic Hungarians.
