= Bukovec =

Bukovec may refer to:

== Places ==
=== Croatia ===
- Bukovec, Međimurje County, a village in the municipality of Selnica
- Bukovec Zelinski, a village near Sveti Ivan Zelina, Zagreb County
- Mali Bukovec, Varaždin County, a village and a municipality in Croatia
- Mali Bukovec, Krapina-Zagorje County, a village near Mače, Croatia
- Veliki Bukovec, Varaždin County, a village and a municipality in Croatia
- Veliki Bukovec, Krapina-Zagorje County, a village near Mače, Croatia

=== Czech Republic ===
- Bukovec (Frýdek-Místek District), a municipality and village, Moravian-Silesian Region
- Bukovec (Plzeň-South District), a municipality and village, Plzeň Region
- Bukovec, a village and part of Dubá, Liberec Region
- Bukovec, a village and part of Kamenný Újezd (České Budějovice District), Plzeň Region
- Bukovec, a village and part of Plzeň, Plzeň Region

=== Romania ===
- Bukovec, the Hungarian name for Bucovăţ village, Dumbrava Commune, Timiș County

=== Slovakia ===
- Bukovec, Košice-okolie District, a municipality and village, Košice Region
- Bukovec, Myjava District, a municipality and village, Trenčín Region
- Pohronský Bukovec, a municipality and village, Banská Bystrica Region
- Bukovec Mountains

=== Slovenia ===
- Bukovec, Slovenska Bistrica, a settlement in the Municipality of Slovenska Bistrica
- Bukovec, Velike Lašče, a settlement in the Municipality of Velike Lašče
- Bukovec pri Poljanah, a settlement in the Municipality of Ribnica

== People ==
- Anton Žerdín Bukovec (born 1950), Slovenian priest
- Brigita Bukovec (born 1970), Slovenian hurdler
- Sophie Bukovec (born 1995), Canadian beach volleyball player

== See also ==
- Bukovets (disambiguation)
- Bukovac (disambiguation)
- Bucovăț (disambiguation)
- Bukowiec (disambiguation)
