= Shalanky =

- Village
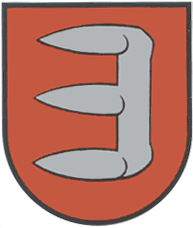
- Coat of arms

- Location within Zakarpattia Oblast
- Coordinates: 48°13′40″N 22°53′2″E
- Country: Ukraine
- Oblast: Zakarpattia Oblast
- Raion: Berehove Raion

Shalanky (Ukrainian: Шаланки, Hungarian: Salánk) is a village in western Ukraine, within Berehove Raion of Zakarpattia Oblast, but was formerly administered as part of Vynohradiv Raion.

== Geography ==
The village is located around 16 km northwest of Vynohradiv on the bank of the brook Borzsa. Administratively, the village belongs to the Berehove Raion, Zakarpattia Oblast.

== Population ==
The population includes 3110 inhabitants, mostly Hungarians, with a density of 0,280 people / km^{2}
