= Fanchykovo =

Fanchykovo Фанчиковo Fancsika (in Hungarian)
- Village
- Location of Fanchykovo Fanchykovo (Ukraine)
- Coordinates: 48°07′00″N 22°57′00″E
- Country: Ukraine
- Oblast: Zakarpattia Oblast
- Raion: Berehove Raion
- Established: 1300

Area
  - Total: 3,208 km^{2} (1,239 sq mi)
- Elevation: 124 m (407 ft)

Population (2001)
  - Total: 2,059
  - Density: 0.6418/km^{2} (1.662/sq mi)
- Postal code: 90352
- Area code: +380 03143

Fanchykovo (Ukrainian: Фанчиковo; Hungarian: Fancsika) is a village in Berehove Raion of the Zakarpattia Oblast in western Ukraine.

Fanchykovo is also known as Фанчиково (Fanchikovo, Russian), Fancsika (Hungarian), Fančikovo (Slovak), Fanecsika, Fanchykove, and Fantschykowo. It was formerly in Czechoslovakia.

== Notable people ==
Vasyl Rats (born 1961), Ukrainian former football midfielder. He participated in two World Cups with the Soviet Union national football team
