= Zakarpattia Lowland =

Zakarpattia Lowland Закарпатська низовина
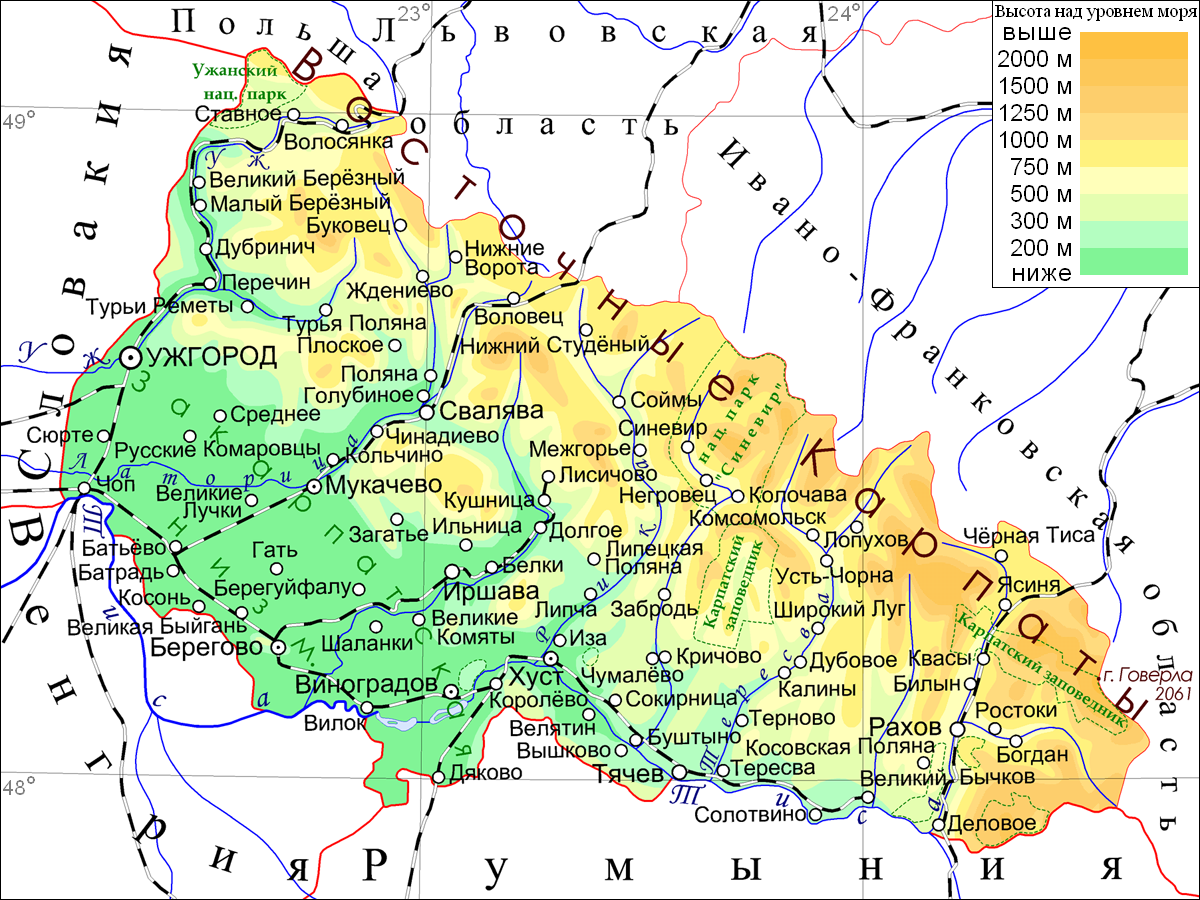
- Lowland region in Zakarpattia Oblast
- Countries: Ukraine
- Region: Zakarpattia Oblast

The Zakarpattia Lowland (Ukrainian: Закарпатська низовина, romanized: Zakarpats'ka nyzovyna; Hungarian: Kárpátaljai-alföld) or Upper Tysa Lowland (Ukrainian: Потиська низовина, romanized: Potys'ka nyzovyna is a lowland in the southwestern portion of the Zakarpattia Oblast in the drainage basin of Tisza river and located on its right banks. The plain stretches along the Hungary-Ukraine border.

The lowland has an area of 2,000 km^{2} (770 sq mi). Average height is 102–120 m (335–394 ft), while maximum is 400 m (1,300 ft) (Berehove Hills).

The lowland contains most of the population of region and includes all its major cities such as Uzhhorod, Mukachevo, Berehove, Vynohradiv and others.

== See also ==
- Pannonian plain
- Vihorlat-Gutin Area
