= Batrad =

- Village
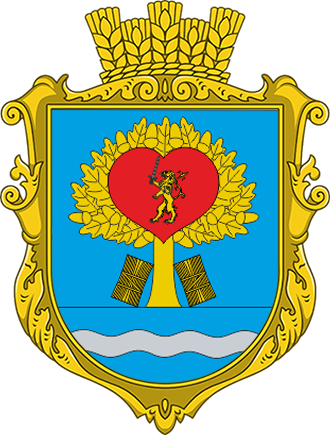
- Coat of arms

- Location within Zakarpattia Oblast
- Coordinates: 48°19′22″N 22°24′45″E
- Country: Ukraine
- Oblast: Zakarpattia Oblast
- Raion: Berehove Raion

Batrad (Ukrainian: Батрадь, Hungarian: Bótrágy, Rusyn: Бовтрадь) is a village in Zakarpattia Oblast (province) of western Ukraine.

== Geography ==
The village is located around 22.6 km northwest of Berehovo. Administratively, the village belongs to the Berehove Raion, Zakarpattia Oblast.

== Area ==
The total area is of 2.520 km2.

== Population ==
Nowadays the population includes 1846 inhabitants, with a density of 733 people / km^{2}
