= Velyki Berehy =

Velyki Berehy Nagybereg
- Village
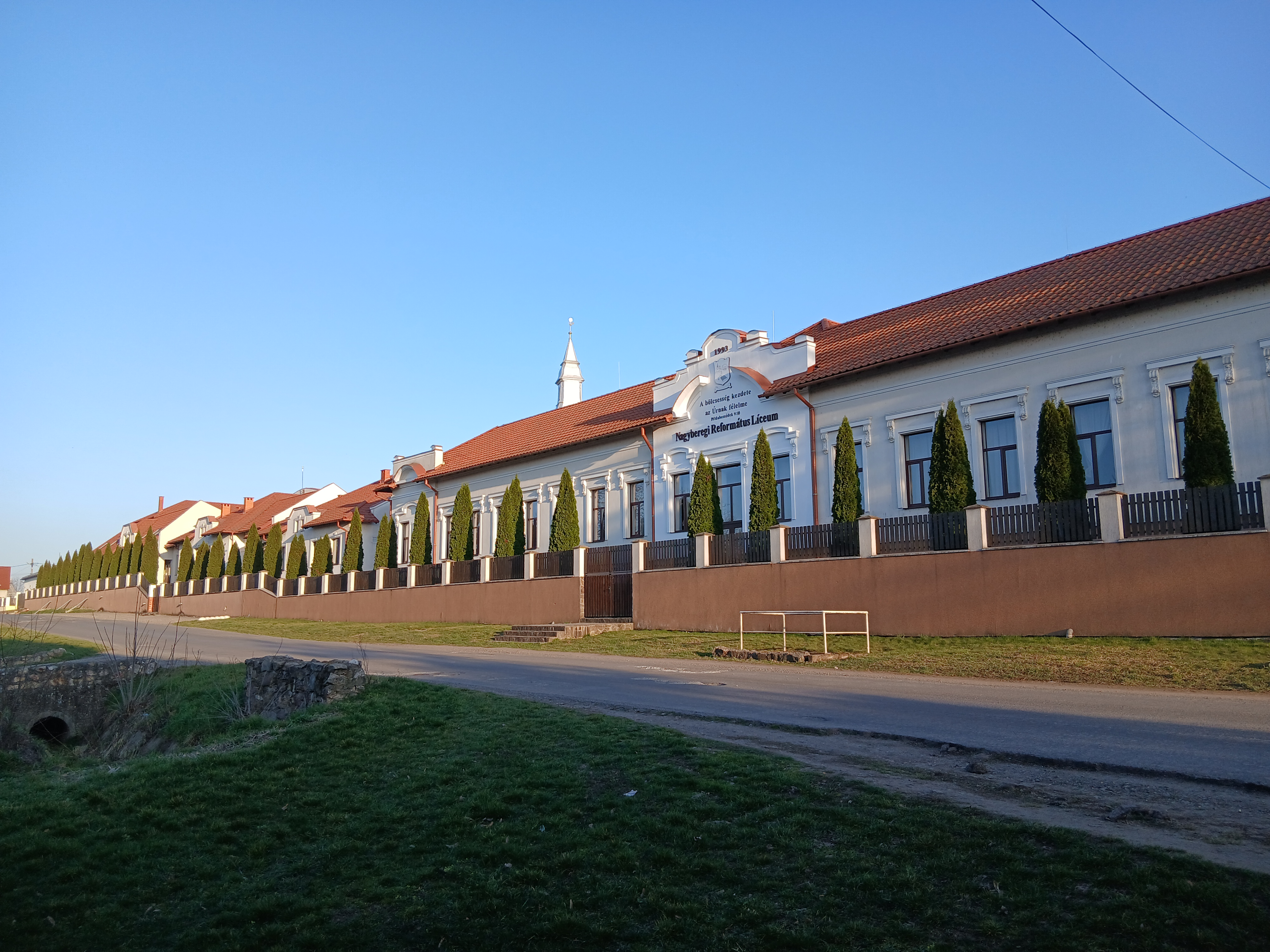
- Reformed Lyceum of Nagybereg

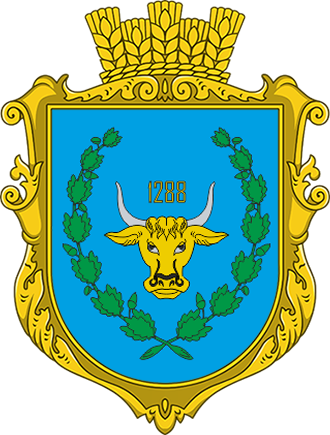
- Coat of arms
- Interactive map of Velyki Berehy
- Location within Zakarpattia Oblast
- Coordinates: 48°13′53″N 22°45′01″E
- Country: Ukraine
- Oblast: Zakarpattia Oblast
- Raion: Berehove Raion

Velyki Berehy (Ukrainian: Великі Береги, Hungarian Nagybereg) is a village in Zakarpattia Oblast, western Ukraine. It is located around 10 kilometres (6.2 mi) northeast of Berehove, on the right bank of the rivulet Borzsova, and on the eastern side of the loch Szernye. Administratively, the village belongs to the Berehove Raion, Zakarpattia Oblast. Historically, the name originates in the Hungarian berek and was first mentioned as Beregu.

== Population ==
In 1910, it had a population of 2,133, mostly Hungarians. As of 2012, the population includes 2,674 inhabitants, of which 2,240 (80 percent) are Hungarians.
