= Chetfalva =

Chetfalva Четфалва Csetfalva
- Village
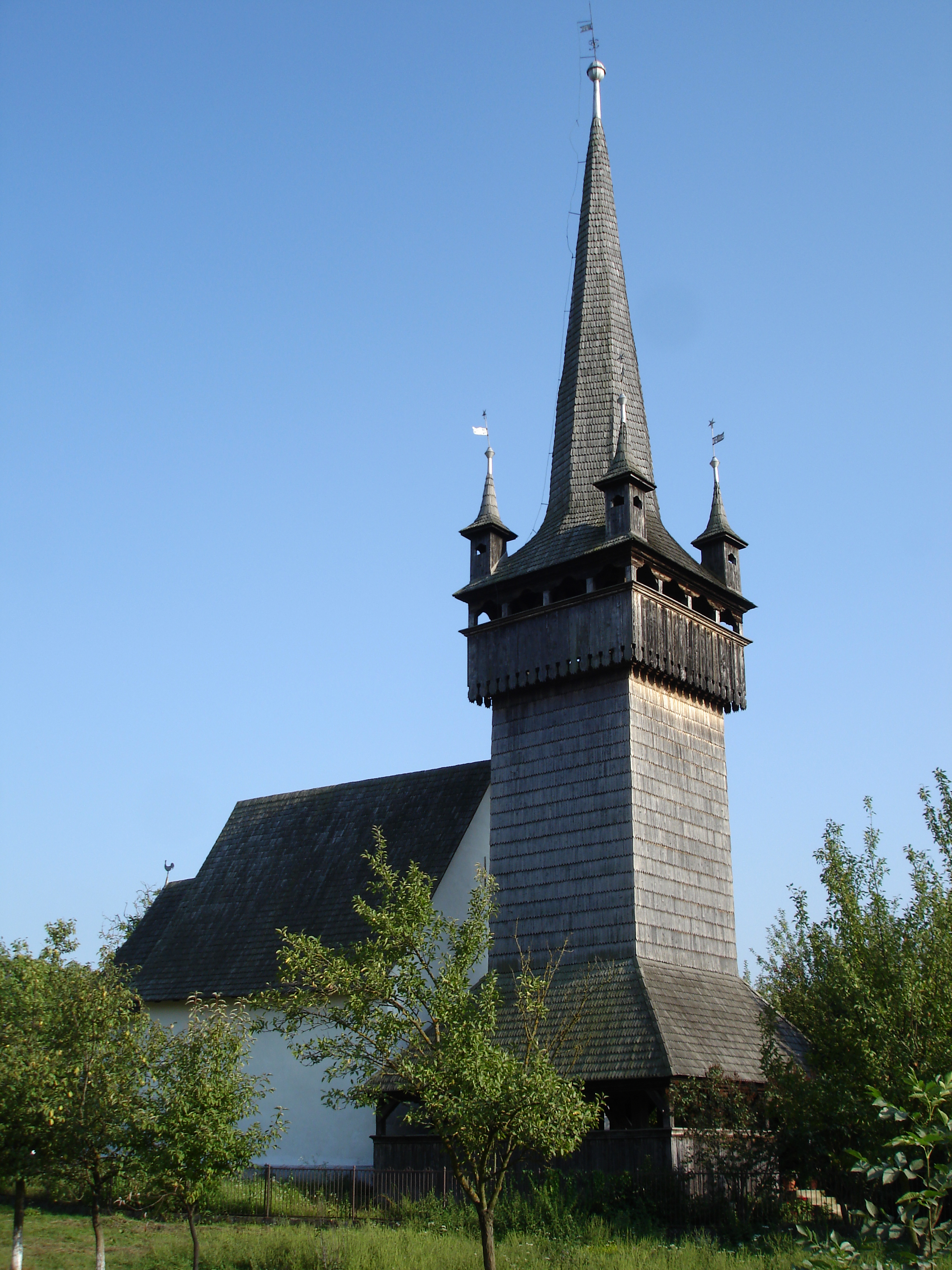
- The Reformed church and tower

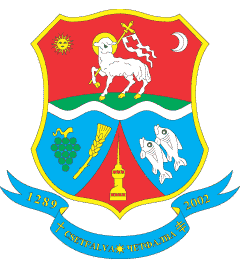
- Coat of arms
- Interactive map of Chetfalva
- Location of Chetfalva in Zakarpattia Oblast Location of Chetfalva in Ukraine
- Coordinates: 48°07′34″N 22°47′39″E
- Country: Ukraine
- Oblast: Zakarpattia Oblast
- District: Berehove Raion
- Established: 1260

Area
  - Total: 1.26 km^{2} (0.49 sq mi)

Population (2001)
  - Total: 755 ▼
  - Density: 599/km^{2} (1,550/sq mi)
- Time zone: UTC+2 (EET)
  - Summer (DST): UTC+3 (EEST)
- Postal code: 90262
- Area code: +380 03141

Chetfalva (Ukrainian: Четфалва, Hungarian: Csetfalva) is a village located in Berehove Raion of Zakarpattia Oblast in western Ukraine.

== Etymology ==
The Hungarian name of the village, Csetfalva means "Cset's village". According to the folklore, the settlement was named after one of Prince Árpád's loyal subjects, the founder of the village, a landowner named Cset or Csete. The first mention of today's name dates back to 1408.

The name Csetfalva first appeared in a written document in 1341 in the form villa Chet, the name Csetfalva was first mentioned in 1446 with the spelling Chedfalwa, later in 1477 Chethfalwa.

The Russian and Ukrainian term of the village from the Soviet times until 1995 was Четово [Chetovo], which is a translation. In 1995 the village was renamed to Четфалва [Chetfalva].

== History ==
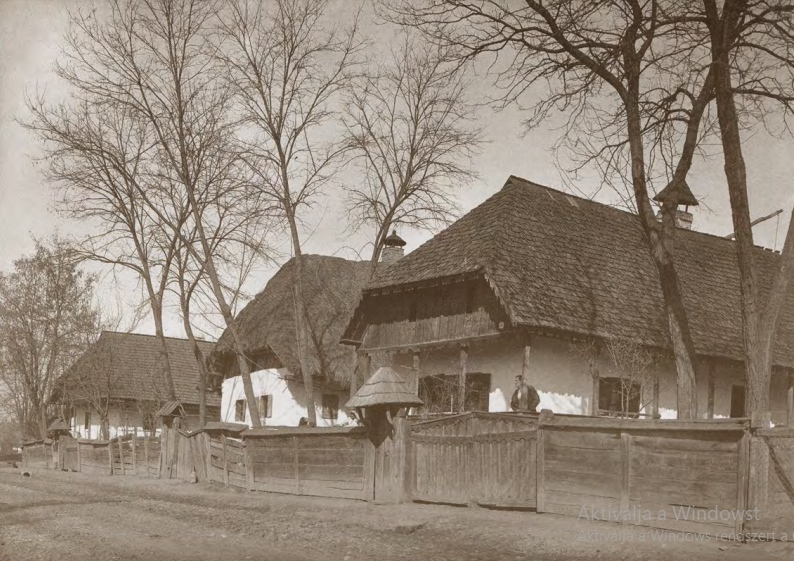
Chetfalva in 1921

Its first known owners were members of the Szécsi family. In 1418, it was owned by Pál Szécsi and his son Jakab, who received it from King Sigismund as a royal gift. In 1498, members of the Tarczy family received partial ownership of the village. In 1513, Albert Lónyay and his wife bought the village from Sára, the widow of János Tarcsa, for a perpetual price.

At the end of the 15th century in the village of Csetfalva there was a customs office, and a Catholic church was built. In 1566, Csetfalva was devastated during the Tatar raid.

In 1600, the owners of the settlement were: Zsigmond Rákóczi, István Lónyay, Péter Réthey, István Mikolay, Péter Anarcsi, István Báthory, Pál Melith.

In the last years of the 1700s, the owners of the village were: Báró Prényi, the Csató and Buday families.

In the last years of the 1800s, the owners of the village were: the Abonyi, Buday, Csató, Lónyay, Pogány families.

In 1904, the Ministry of Internal Affairs of Hungary approved the coat of arms of the village, based on the ancient seal of Csetfalva from the 16th century.

== Population ==
In 1910 the population was 558. 99.5% of the people were Hungarians, the remaining 3 people were Rusyn, Slovak and German. 61.6% of the population were Calvinists, 19.4% Catholics, 11.6% Greek Catholics and 7.4% Jews.

Today the population according to the 2001 census is 755, 97.4% of the population is Hungarian, 2.4% Ukrainian, 0.3% Russian.

== Main sights ==
=== Reformed church ===
At the end of the 15th century in the village of Chetfalva there was a customs office, and a Catholic church was built. According to the documents, in 1645 there was already a flourishing Reformed congregation in the settlement after the reformation, and the church was re-consecrated. Later, during the time of noble judge István Beregi and second judge Mihály Gerét, the church was completely remodeled. In 1648, the widow of György Szabó Nánási had an ornate communion chalice made for the church. A retaining wall was built at the southwest corner of the nave.

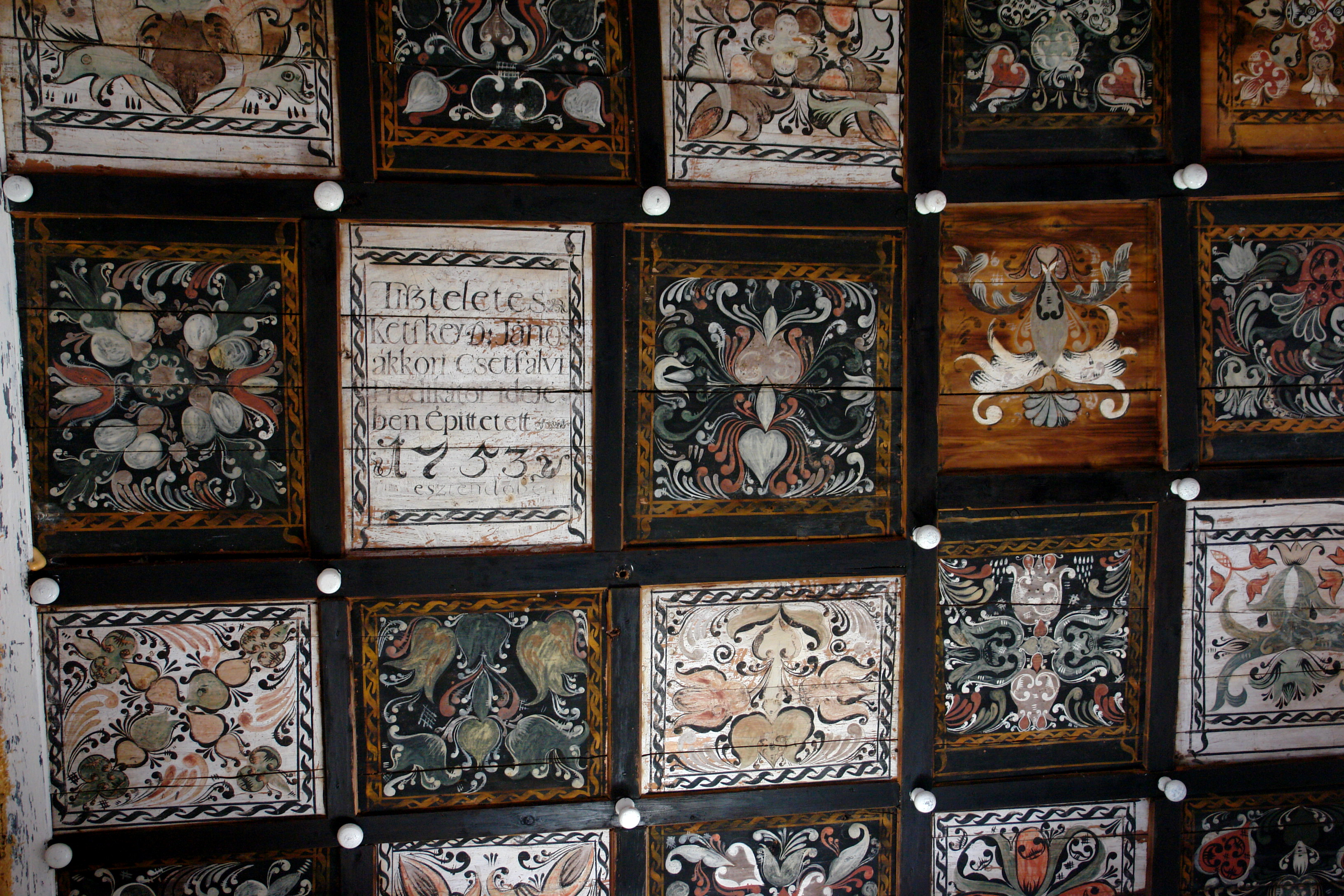

The ceiling of the nave was painted in 1753 by Ferenc Lándor Asztalos. Those nave ceiling is divided into cassettes of slightly unequal size and shape, 10 pcs. length and 6 pcs. for width. All 60 cassettes of the nave ceiling are full of folk motifs and embellished with floral ornamentation, only two of which are repeated, and they alternate like a chessboard, consisting of darker and lighter blue fields. On the cassettes of the sanctuary, flowers, leaves and tendrils can be seen on a white background. And nave ceilings painted in the sanctuary in 1773 also by Ferenc Lándor Asztalos.

=== Bell tower ===
The bell tower was built in 1796 in front of the entrance of the Reformed church, the shingled belfry with four spiers, which is the work of master wooden tower builder Imre Kakuk. It was built directly in front of the western facade.

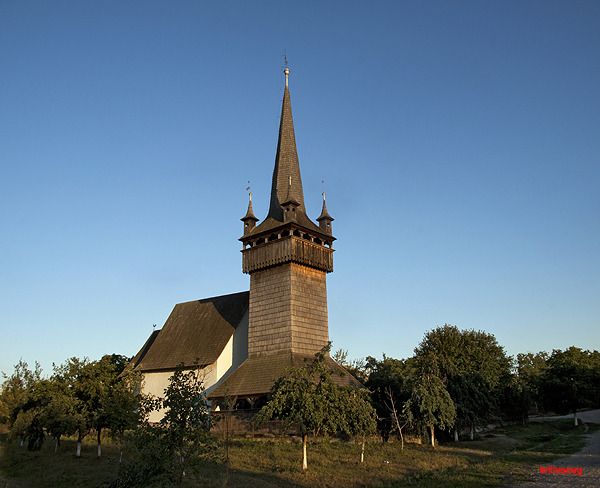

Its 30-metre high, peaked wooden tower with four young towers can be seen from several kilometers away, It is considered the tallest of the Transcarpathian wooden towers, and its frame structure is completely unique. Its well-proportioned, high, skirted, galleried, wooden bell tower with four buttresses is covered by a needle-pointed helmet. Its dome and the bell tower itself have the same proportions, but from a spatial perspective, the end seems lower. The bottom of this structure is an open frame protected from the rain by a wide belt. The tower simply stands on the ground – it has no foundation, instead, stones are laid around the perimeter with a wooden strap that rests on 16 support columns connected by an advanced bracing system.
