= Bucovăț (disambiguation) =

Bucovăț is a town in Strășeni District, Moldova.

Bucovăț may also refer to the following entities in Romania

- Bucovăț, Dolj, a commune in Dolj County
- Bucovăț, Timiș, a commune in Timiș County
- Bucovăț, a village in Dumbrava Commune, Timiș County
- Bucovăț, a tributary of the Moldova in Suceava County

== See also ==
- Bukovina (disambiguation)
- Bukovec (disambiguation)
- Bukovac (disambiguation)
