= Bukovac Palace =

Coordinates: 45.38°N 20.39°E

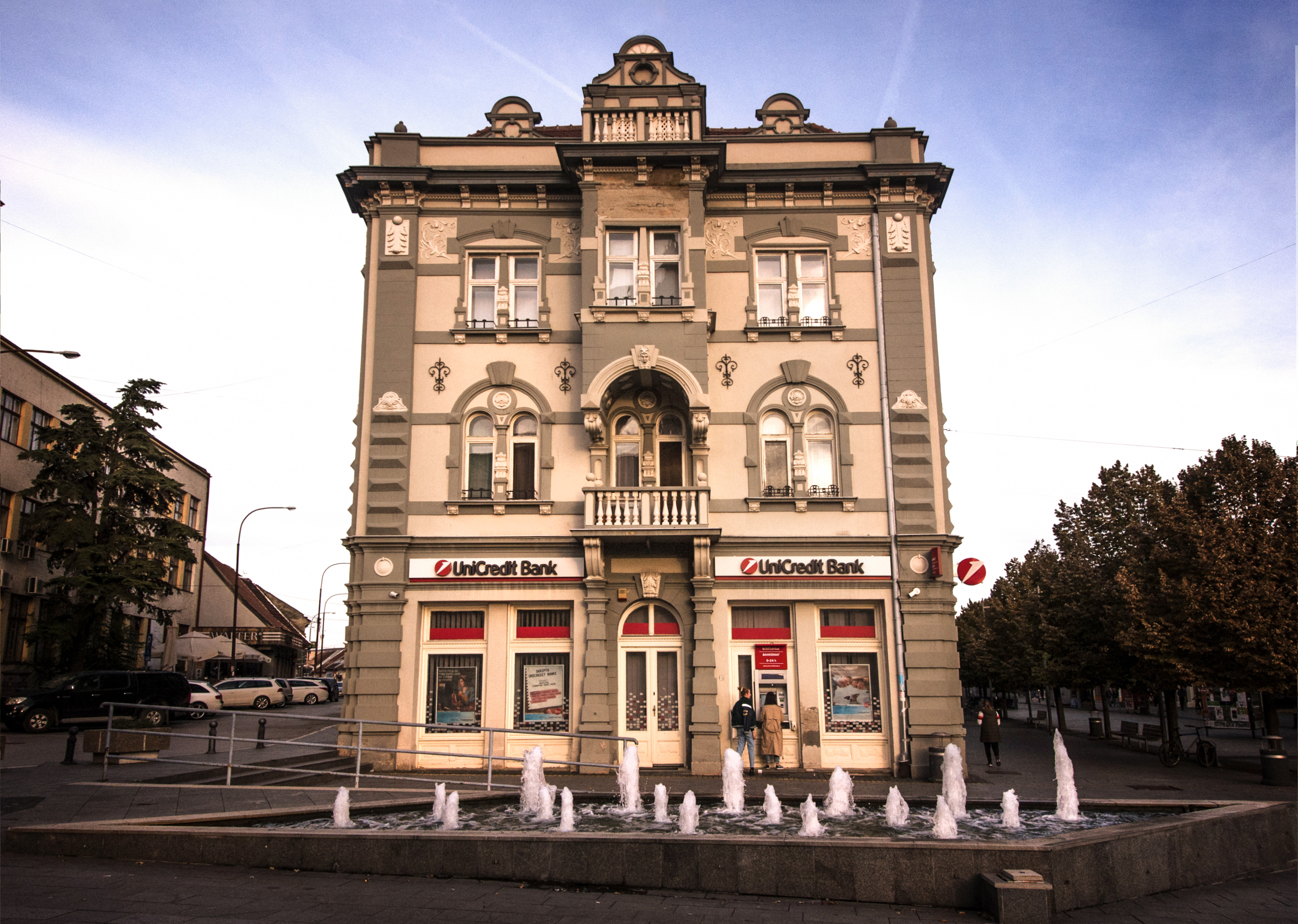
Bukovac palace

Bukovac palace in the main street, at the beginning of the 20th century (it is located in the left corner)

Bukovac palace (Буковчева палата/Bukovčeva palata in Serbian) is a building located at the beginning of King Alexander I street, in Zrenjanin.

== History ==
The palace was built in 1895 by an unknown architect, in the manner of Neo-Renaissance. It has two floors and a balcony towards the main square. Windows are made to look like biphoras. The palace was built by a trader Stevan Bukovac.

In the 1960s, Bukovac palace was cut off from the rest of the 19th century buildings by raising a compartment building just behind it. Another building was built in 1998 to fill in the space between Bukovac palace and the soc-realist building.

== Today ==
Bukovac palace was renovated in 2012 and its facade is in perfect condition.
