= Lypetska Poliana =

Lypetska Poliana Липецька Поляна
- Village
- Location of Lypetska Poliana Lypetska Poliana (Ukraine)
- Coordinates: 48°20′51″N 23°22′06″E
- Country: Ukraine
- Oblast: Zakarpattia Oblast
- Raion: Khust Raion
- Founded: 1653

Government
  - Mayor: Vasyl Vasyliovych
- Elevation: 267 m (876 ft)

Population (2001)
  - Total: 2,965
- Time zone: UTC+1 (CET)
  - Summer (DST): UTC+2 (CEST)
- Postal code: 90425
- Area code: +380-3142

Lypetska Poliana (Ukrainian and Rusyn: Ли́пе́цька Поля́на; Yiddish: פאליען-ליפשא; Hungarian: Lipcsemező) is a village in Khust Raion of Zakarpattia Oblast, part of the Transcarpathian region of Ukraine.

The center of the village council, located on the right bank of the river Rika is 22 km from the district center and the railway station Khust, on the highway Khust - Svalyava. The roadway T0712 runs through the village. This road connects with the M06 highway in Svaliava and the P21 highway near Khust.

The population at the 2001 census was 2,965 people.

== History ==
The first mention of Lypetska Poliana dates back to 1653. It has been historically an ethnically Rusyn village. During the time that the area was part of the Kingdom of Hungary, the village was located in the district of Dolha of the Máramaros County.

Residents were among those who emigrated to Canada and the United States looking for work during the years 1880-1918, many of them working in coal mines.

In March–April 1919, Soviet power existed in the village. In 1932, the organization of the HR Committee began to operate, whose first secretary was I. Perez. After the seizure of village from the Axis October 24, 1944), 23 residents voluntarily entered the Red Army, and 9 were part of the 1st Czechoslovak Army Corps. 2 of them were awarded with orders and medals of the USSR, 18 gave their lives in battles for freedom and independence of the Motherland. In the village there is a monument to fellow villagers, who died in the struggle against the Nazis.

In 1930, the Jewish population was 239. With the Hungarian occupation of the region in March, 1939, Jews were forcefully removed from their occupations. From 1940 to 1941, Jews from the village were drafted into forced labor battalions and others were drafted for service on the Eastern front, where most died. By 1941, the Jewish population had increased to 280 and Jewish families without Hungarian citizenship were expelled to Nazi occupied Ukrainian territory, to Kamenets-Podolski, and murdered there. The remaining Jews of Lypetska Poliana were deported to Auschwitz late May, 1944.

At the entrance to the village is located the square of the spring white blossom. This plant is listed to the Red Book of Ukraine. The size of the area is 0.3 hectares. In the forests and on the meadows grow a large number of forest berries, mushrooms, medicinal and honey plants.

There is an elementary school in the village.

=== Church of the St. Mary Peter and Paul, 1847 ===
In 1751 there was mention of the wooden church with a small tower, two bells and small images. The current church dates to 1847 and is a typical walled basilica with a Baroque finish.

== Notable people ==
- Vasyl Khimyshynets- Ukrainian poet

== Media ==
In 1963, the Odessa film studio filmed "Tsars" in the village. Villagers participated in the movie.

== Gallery ==
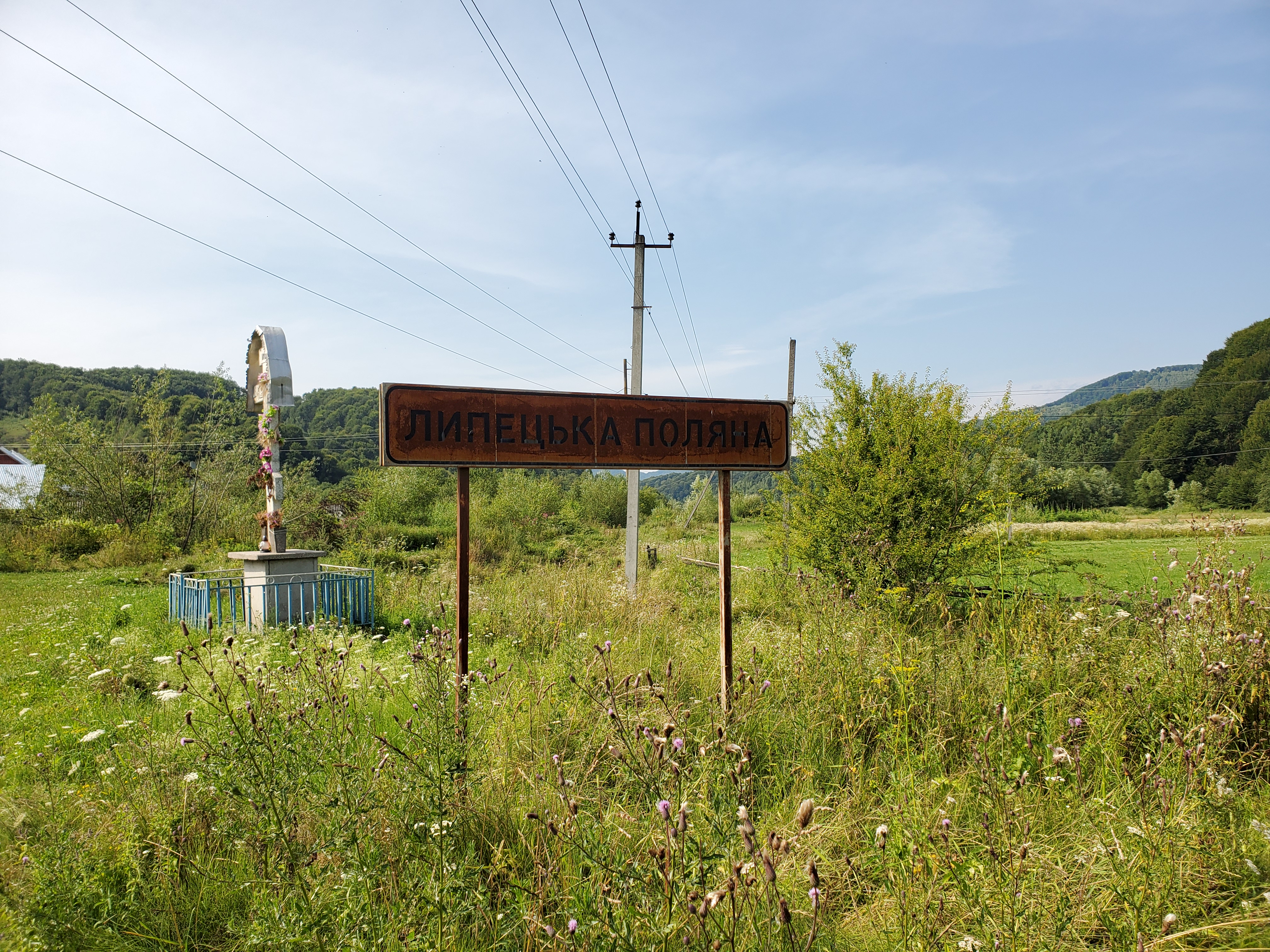
Sign at the village entrance

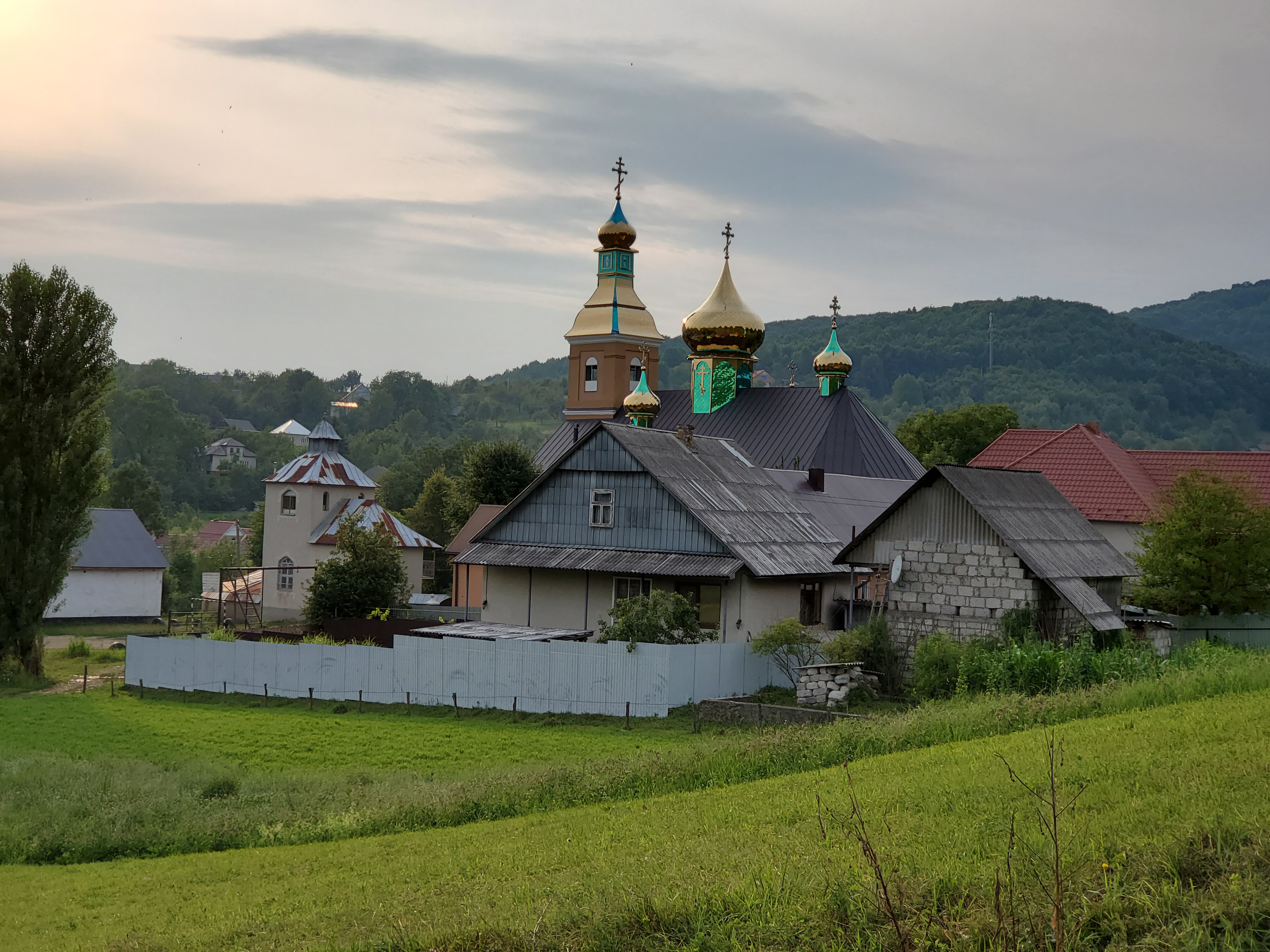
Church

== See also ==
- Zakarpattia Oblast
