= Veliatyno =

Veliatyno Велятино
- Village
- Interactive map of Veliatyno
- Location within Zakarpattia Oblast Location within Ukraine
- Coordinates: 48°6′34″N 23°18′49″E
- Country: Ukraine
- Oblast: Zakarpattia Oblast
- Raion: Khust Raion

Population (2001)
  - Total: 4,576

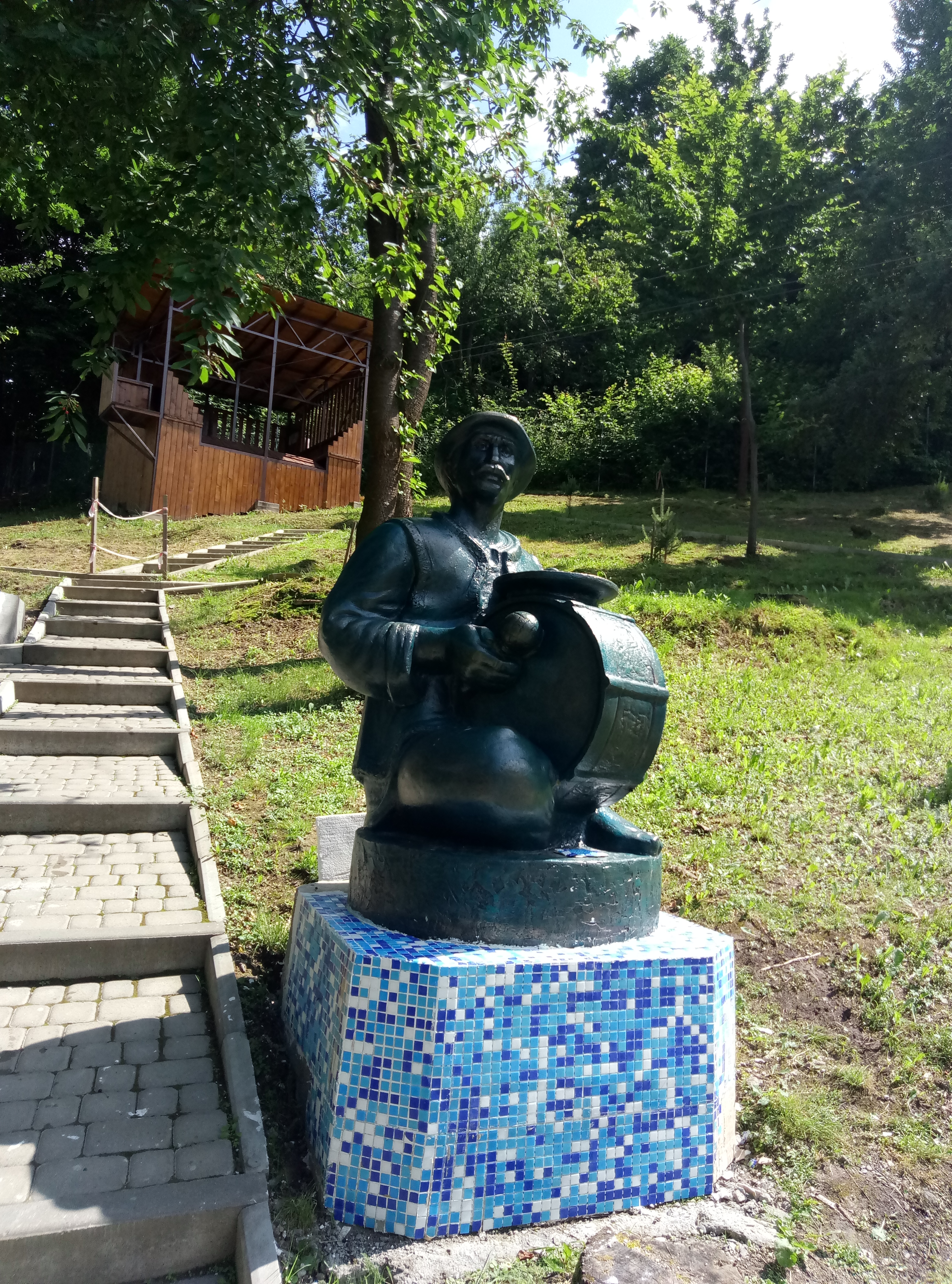

Veliatyno (Ukrainian: Велятино; Hungarian: Veléte) is a village in the Khust Raion of Zakarpattia Oblast, Ukraine. As of 2001, its population was 4,576. It was formerly named Veliatyn, until 2018.
