= Berezovo, Ukraine =

Berezovo Березово Berezna
- Village
- Location within Zakarpattia Oblast Location within Ukraine
- Coordinates: 48°18′14″N 23°29′21″E
- Country: Ukraine
- Oblast: Zakarpattia Oblast
- Raion: Khust Raion
- Established: 1415
- Elevation: 247 m (810 ft)

Population (2001)
  - Total: 3,000
- Time zone: UTC+2 (EET)
  - Summer (DST): UTC+3 (EEST)
- Post code: 90426

Berezovo (Ukrainian: Березово; Hungarian: Berezna) is a village in the Khust Raion of Zakarpattia Oblast, Ukraine. As of 2001, its population was 3,000.
