= Pavshyno =

Pavshyno Павшино
- Village
- Location within Zakarpattia Oblast Location within Ukraine
- Coordinates: 48°24′54″N 22°41′23″E
- Country: Ukraine
- Oblast: Zakarpattia Oblast
- Raion: Mukachevo Raion

Area
  - Total: 1.735 km^{2} (0.670 sq mi)
- Elevation: 115 m (377 ft)

Population
  - Total: 838
  - Density: 483/km^{2} (1,250/sq mi)
- Time zone: UTC+2 (EET)
  - Summer (DST): UTC+3 (EEST)
- Post Code: 89627
- Area code: +380 3131

Pavshyno (Ukrainian: Пáвшино, German: Pausching, Hungarian: Pósaháza) is a village in Mukachevo Raion, Zakarpattia Oblast and a suburb of Mukachevo. Pavshyno is the site of a "Temporary Detention Centre" for refugees.

== Naming and German culture ==
The name of the village has been transliterated variously from Cyrillic as Pawschino, Pavschino, Povshin, Pavshyn, Pawsin, Pausin, and Pausyn.

All of those transliterations are/were attempts to render 'Pausching' into and out of various local languages, Pausching being the Swabian name of the village since about 1750, before which it had been known as Posahaza.

To this day, the village has a German Catholic Church and about one third of population identify themselves as German.

== Demographics ==
Native language according to the 2001 Ukrainian census:

Native languages in Pavshyno
	percent
Ukrainian	49.5%
German	34.2%
Hungarian	13.6%
Russian	2.3%

== Military installations ==
Map of Dnepr radar site at Mukachevo. The two arrays are at 196 and 260 degrees (south and west)

The site is a former military base which housed RSD-10 Pioneer (SS-20) missiles allegedly aimed at targets in Belgium. It is now managed by Military Unit 2142 of the State Border Guard Service of Ukraine. In 2002 it was turned into a detention centre.

The Dnepr radar, which was officially closed in 2009, is located near Pavshyno. The radar was served by the nearby settlement of Shenborn, also located near the abandoned Mukachevo Air Base.

The village is located on M 24 highway, between the city of Mukachevo to the north and the abandoned Mukachevo Air Base to the south.

== Pavshyno Detention Center ==
=== December 2002 ===
In December 2002 Tristina Moore filed a report for BBC News. She was able to visit Pavshino with a film crew. She reported that about 100 detainees were kept ten to a room, some only having mattresses to sleep on. She said there was no heating despite a winter approaching with temperatures dropping to -10C. The budget to feed each detainee was ₴2 (€0.40). She quoted Guy Ouellet of the UNHCR, Kyiv as saying "Once anyone has applied for asylum status, they should be held in open accommodation. And that's not happening."

=== June 2003 ===
In June 2003, the International Federation of Red Cross and Red Crescent Societies, (IFRCRCS), reported an influx of detainees meaning Pavshino then contained 320 detainees over half of whom were Chinese. Strict quarantine controls were in place because of fear of the SARS infection. The Ukrainian Red Cross Society submitted a request for 30,000 CHF to supply basic food, medicines and hygiene items plus the services of a doctor and psychologist to help with the needs of undocumented migrants.

=== September 2003 ===
In September 2003, the IFRCRCS sent a delegate from Minsk to visit Pavshino. This led to the Ukrainian Red Cross including a programme on migration in the annual International Federation Appeal 2004 which would help organising the sending and receiving of correspondence, organising language courses and lectures on health, humanitarian and legal issues.

=== October 2005 ===
The Council of Europe's Committee for the Prevention of Torture (CPT) organised a delegation to visit Ukraine, including the Pavshino Temporary Detention Centre, and similar facilities at Chop, Uzhorod and Mukachevo. Major General B. M. Marchenko, Acting head of the Border protection department of the Border Guard Service liaised with them. The delegation made the immediate observation that three years after their first visit, the Pavshino facility "- in terms of material conditions, staff and medical care - was still clearly unsuitable for the needs of the people being held there." The delegation requested the withdrawal from service of this facility and that replacement facilities be designed and put in place without delay. They noted that the authority appointed to take charge of foreign nationals would require adequate resources, including budgetary resources. In a letter sent in response by the Ukrainian authorities dated 23 January 2006, provided information about how this immediate observation was being addressed. The CPT observed that this response was inadequate, and constituted a significant violation of Article 3 of the European Convention for the Prevention of Torture and Inhuman or Degrading Treatment or Punishment. The report further notes that the Council of Ministers had decided to transfer the responsibility for the detention of foreign nationals to the Ministry of Internal Affairs, but that this ministry was only prepared to take responsibility for new centres, which the letter of 23 January 2006 confirmed had received a budget. Meanwhile, the State Border Guard Service denied having responsibility for the facility, whilst in fact exercising day-to-day control. The CPT reported that there had been complaints of mistreatment prior to July 2005, but that this had not been a problem since a change of staff at that time. They recommended that:

- "ill treatment of persons deprived of liberty and verbal abuse is unacceptable and will be severely sanctioned";
- "no more force than is necessary should be used when affecting an apprehension and that, once apprehended persons have been brought under control, there can be no justification for striking them".

Whilst noting some improvements to the facility since the CPT visit of 2002, the 205 delegation noted that such developments were cancelled out by the fact that 393 detainees were occupying a space earmarked for 250. Some detainees merely had a mattress on the floor whilst others were sleeping two to a bed. In one room 21 men occupied 16m2 with only 14 beds. despite the assistance of humanitarian organisations, clothing and footwear was inadequate for the forthcoming winter, and that inmates had to use buckets or even plastic bags, as no other toilet facilities were available from 8pm to 8am. Medical provisions were severely limited. There was little evidence that a feldsher was available, and there was no regular medical provision or monitoring, creating the danger of outbreak of serious illnesses in the cramped conditions.

The CPT for the second time invoked article 8, paragraph 5 of the Convention, calling on the facility to be withdrawn from service.

The CPT also noted that there was no disciplinary code, and that the locking up of individuals in solitary confinement with no toilet facilities was unacceptable. They requested a response within one month.

=== August 2007 ===
A protest was made outside the camp on 17 August 2007, and the camp is the subject of an ongoing campaign for its closure.
