= Bukovets pass =

Mountain pass in Ukraine

Coordinates: 48°12′25″N 24°55′25″E

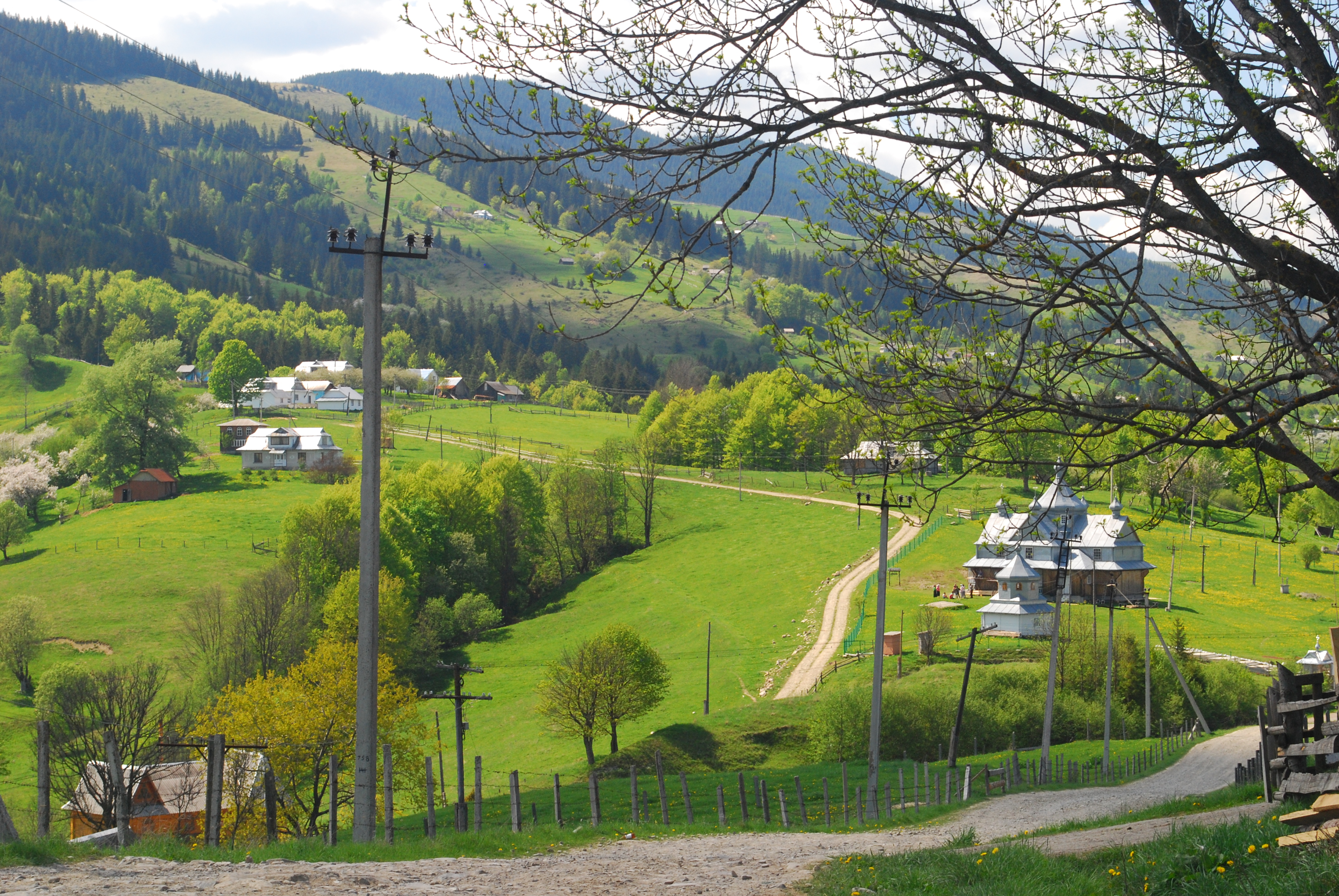

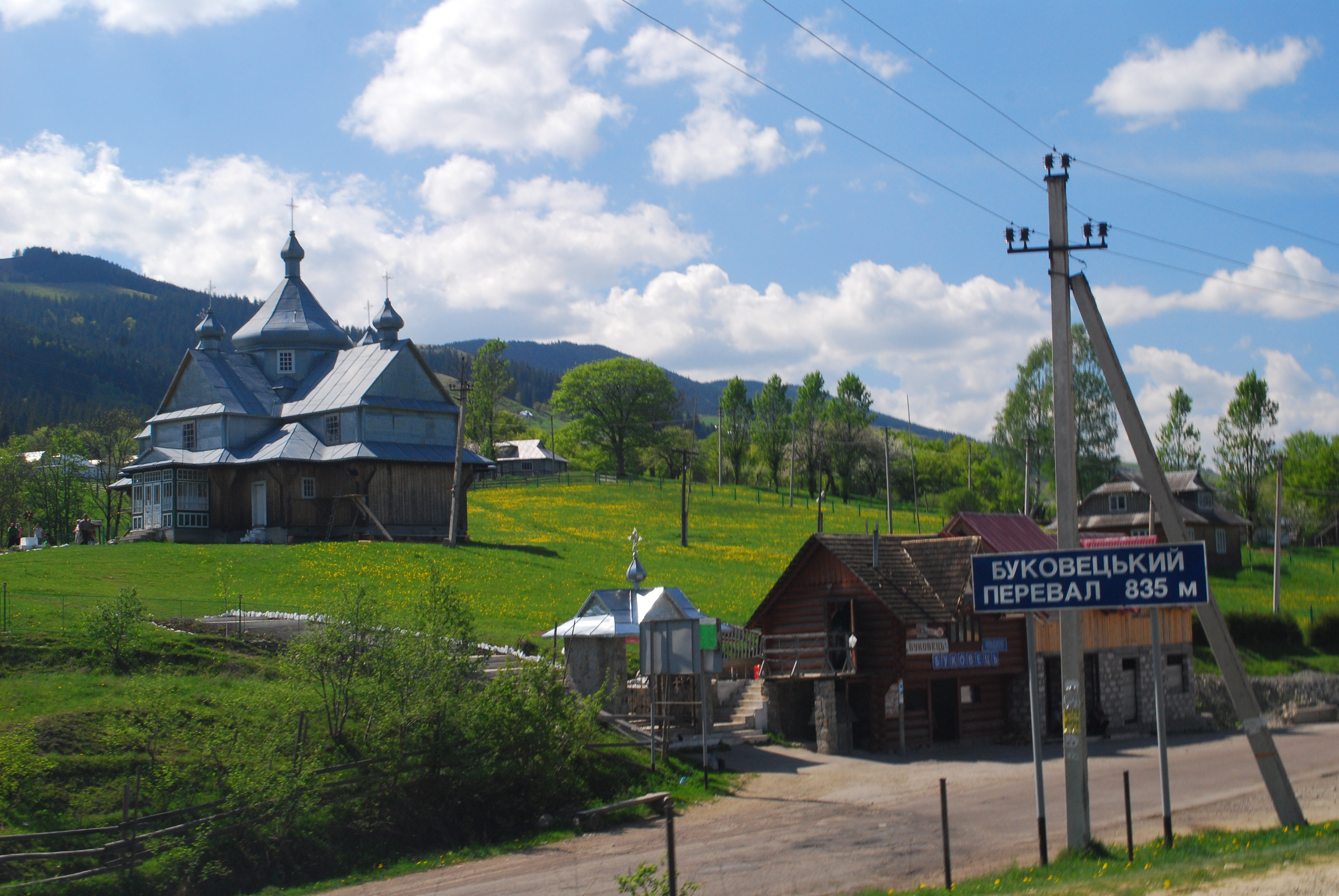

The Bukovets pass is a pass in Pokuttia-Bukovina Carpathians. It is located in the Verkhovyna Raion of the Ivano-Frankivsk Oblast, in the Bukovec village, on the drainage divide of the Rybnytsia and Chornyi Cheremosh rivers. Its elevation is 835 m. Through the pass goes the local highway Р 24: Kosiv — Verkhovyna.

From the pass begins the touristic footpath to the local nature landmark Pysanyj Kamin (Ukrainian: Писаний камінь, lit. 'Painted Rock').

The closest villages are Bukovets, Cheretiv, and Kryvorivnia.
