= Velyka Byihan =

Velyka Byihan Велика Бийгань Nagybégány • Великая Бегань
- Village
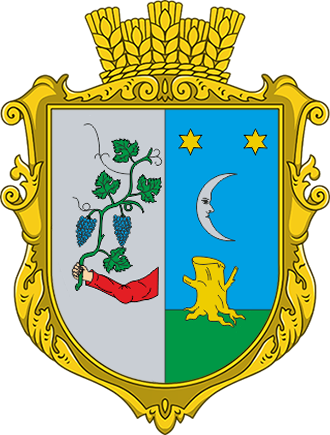
- Coat of arms

- Location within Zakarpattia Oblast Location within Ukraine
- Coordinates: 48°14′53″N 22°34′29″E
- Country: Ukraine
- Oblast: Zakarpattia Oblast
- Raion: Berehove Raion
- Hromada: Velyka Byihan rural hromada

Velyka Byihan (Ukrainian: Велика Бийгань, Hungarian: Nagybégány, Russian: Великая Бегань) is a village in Zakarpattia Oblast (province) of western Ukraine.

== Geography ==
The village is located around 6 km northwest of Berehove along the brook Vérke. Administratively, the village belongs to the Berehove Raion, Zakarpattia Oblast.
