= Yanoshi =

Yanoshi Яноші
- Village

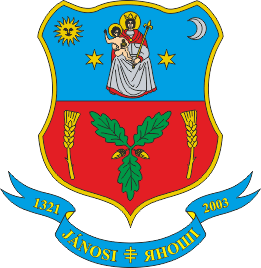
- Coat of arms

- Location within Zakarpattia Oblast
- Coordinates: 48°15′12″N 22°37′47″E
- Country: Ukraine
- Oblast: Zakarpattia Oblast
- Raion: Berehove Raion

Yanoshi (Ukrainian: Яноші, Hungarian: Makkosjánosi) is a village in Zakarpattia Oblast (province) of western Ukraine.

== Geography ==
The village is located around 6 km east of Berehove. Administratively, the village belongs to the Berehove Raion, Zakarpattia Oblast.

== History ==
It was first mentioned as Ivanosi in 1321.

== Population ==
In 1910, it had a population of 1118, mostly Hungarians. According to the official census of 2001, the population included 2,030 inhabitants.
