= Hungary–Ukraine border =

International border

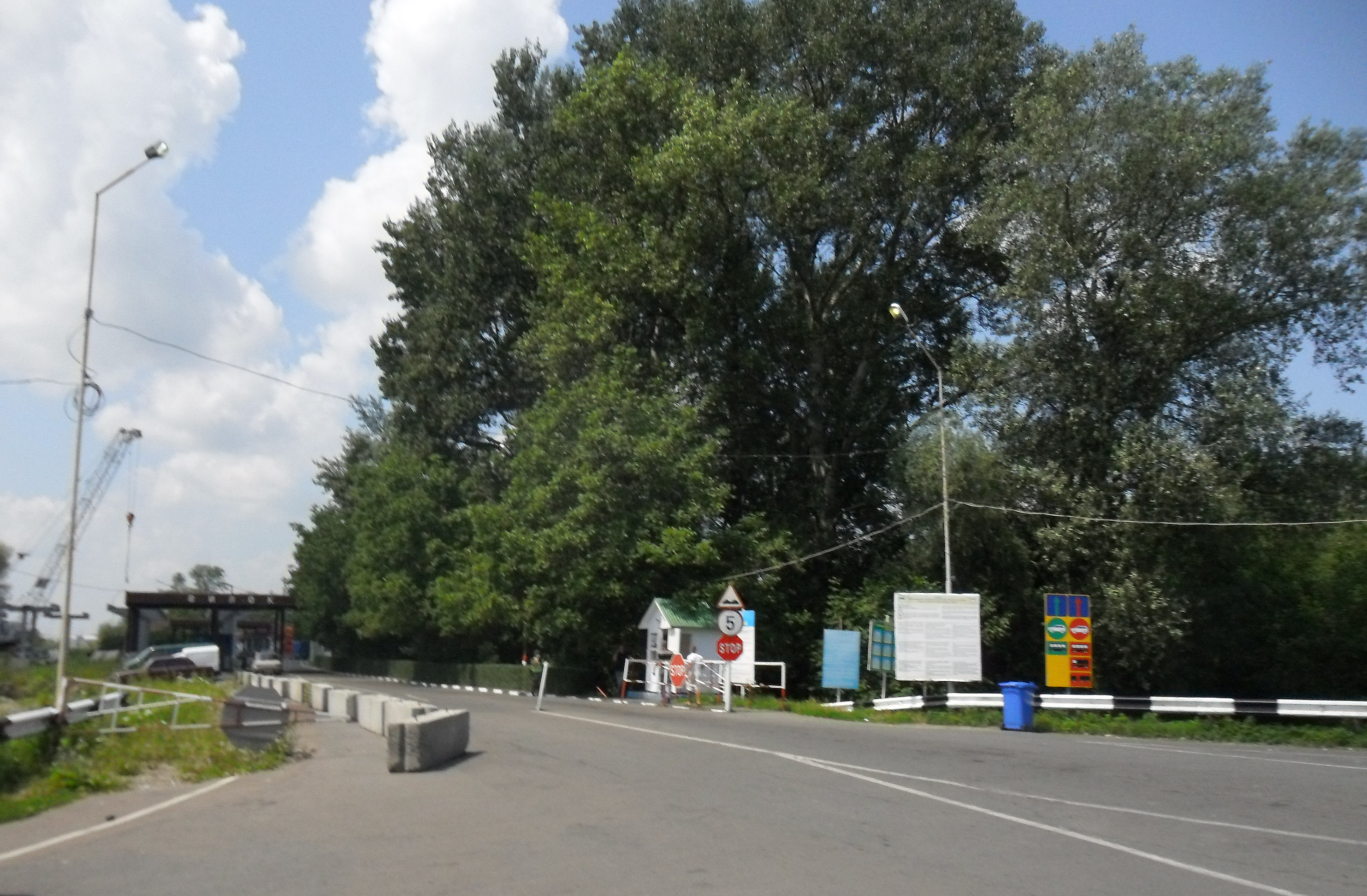
- Checkpoint at the border

Characteristics
- Entities: Hungary Ukraine
- Length: 103 km (64 mi)

History
- Established: 1920; 1991; Signing of the Treaty of Trianon at the end of the World War I Declaration of Independence of Ukraine
- Current shape: 1947; Paris Peace Treaties
- Treaties: Paris Peace Treaties (1947)

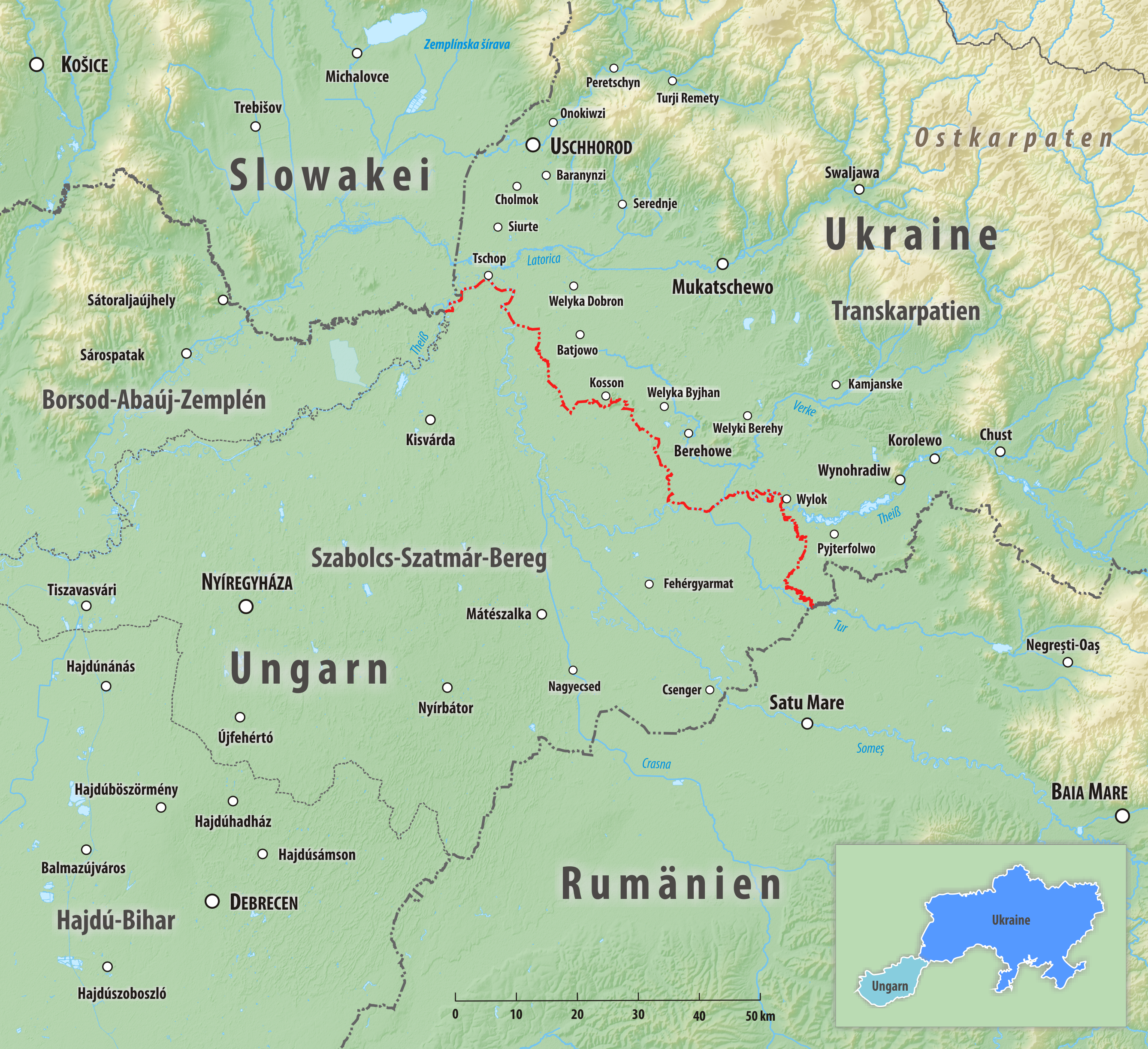
Hungarian–Ukraine border (red)

The Hungary–Ukraine border (Hungarian: magyar–ukrán államhatár; Ukrainian: Угорсько-український кордон) is an internationally established boundary between Hungary and Ukraine. The modern border remains unchanged since the end of the World War II. The current border was established after World War II when Zakarpattia Oblast was admitted into Ukraine, which at the time was part of the Soviet Union as the Ukrainian Soviet Socialist Republic. The border stretches for 136.7 km (84.9 mi) along the Tisza river valley.

After the admission of Hungary to the European Union, the border security became the responsibility of the union, as well.

== Border checkpoints ==
From North to South:

Hungarian and Ukrainian boundary markers

Hungarian Name	Ukrainian name	Hungarian road	Ukrainian road	Type of crossing	Coordinates
Záhony	Chop	Main road 4 (Hungary)	Highway M06 (Ukraine)	Road	
Záhony	Chop	–	–	Railway	
Eperjeske	Solovka	–	–	Railway	
Lónya	Dzvinkove		T-0714	Road	
Barabás	Kosyno		Highway M25 (Ukraine)	Road	
Beregsurány	Luzhanka	Main road 41 (Hungary)	Highway M24 (Ukraine)	Road	
Tiszabecs	Vylok	Main road 491 (Hungary)	Highway M26 (Ukraine)	Road	
Nagyhódos	Velyka Palad			Road	

== See also ==
- State Border of Ukraine
- Hungary–Ukraine relations
- Zakarpattia Lowland
