= Berehove Raion =

Subdivision of Zakarpattia Oblast, Ukraine

Berehove Raion Берегівський район
- Raion
- Flag Coat of arms

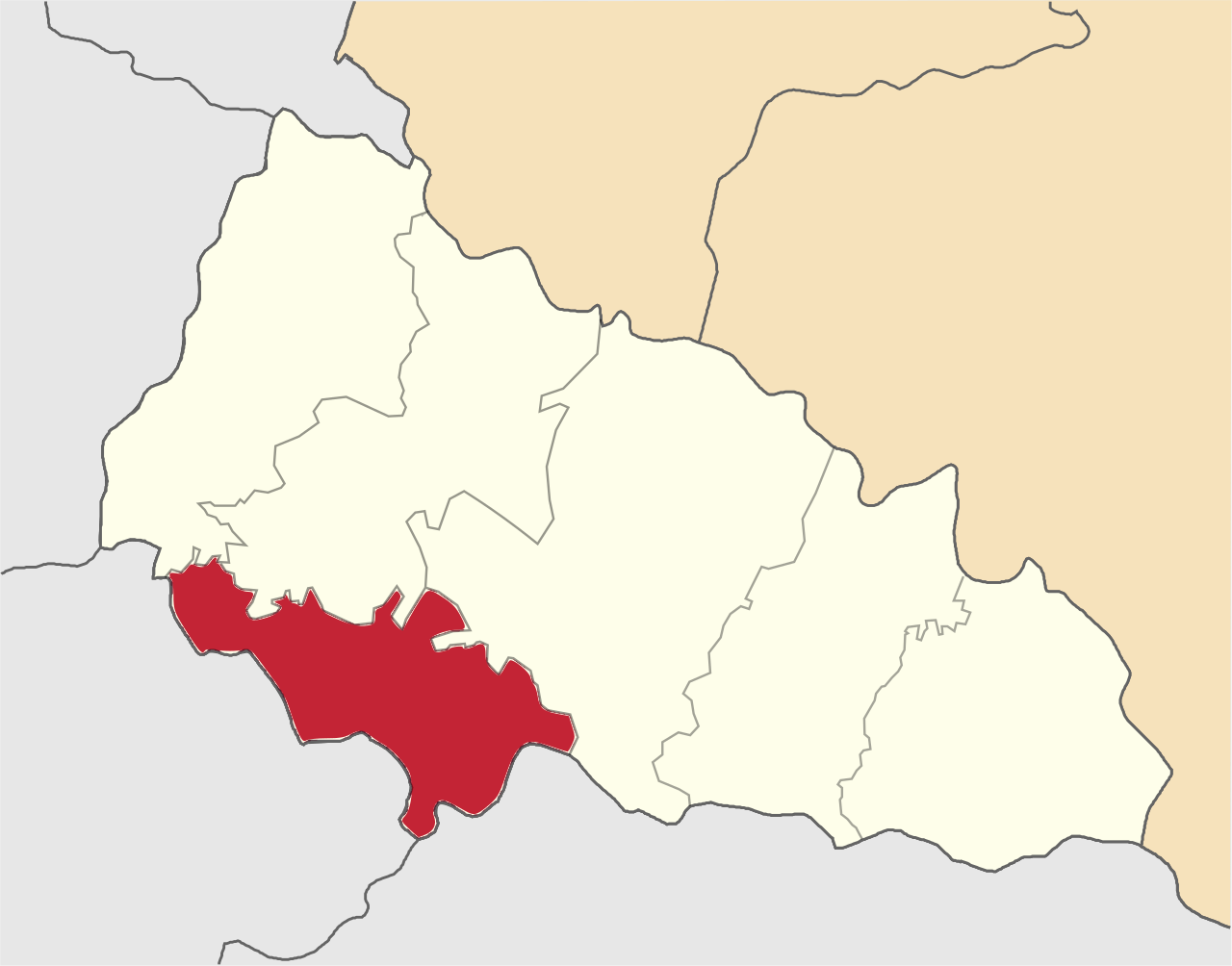
- Coordinates: 48°12′3.17″N 22°38′2.64″E
- Country: Ukraine
- Oblast: Zakarpattia Oblast
- Established: November 9, 1953
- Admin. center: Berehove
- Subdivisions: 10 hromadas

Government
  - Governor: Ihor Svyshcho

Area
  - Total: 1,458.7 km^{2} (563.2 sq mi)
- Elevation: 120 m (390 ft)

Population (2022)
  - Total: 206,696
  - Density: 141.70/km^{2} (367.00/sq mi)
- Time zone: UTC+02:00 (EET)
  - Summer (DST): UTC+03:00 (EEST)
- Postal index: 90200
- Area code: ?
- Website: bereg-rda.gov.ua

Berehove Raion (Ukrainian: Берегівський район; Hungarian: Beregszászi járás) is a raion (district) in Zakarpattia Oblast, in the westernmost corner of Ukraine. The administrative center is Berehove. For many centuries the territory of the district was part of Bereg County. Population: 206,696 (2022 estimate).

On 18 July 2020, as part of the administrative reform of Ukraine, the number of raions of Zakarpattia Oblast was reduced to six, and the area of Berehove Raion was significantly expanded. The January 2020 estimate of the raion population was 50,196 (2020 est.).

== Location ==
The district covers 1,458.7 km^{2} (563.2 sq mi). It is located in the Hungarian plain at the south-western portion of the region on the border with Hungary. The district also borders with such districts of the region as Mukachevo, Uzhhorod and Khust. It also borders with Romania from south-east after annexing abolished Vynohradiv Raion due to Ukraine's administrative reforms.

Through the district flow three rivers, the Tisza, Borzhava, and Salva. Most of the territory is an open plain with some elevation at its north-eastern portion, closer to the Carpathian ridges.

== Demographics ==
According to the 2001 Ukrainian Census, the population of Berehove Raion is 54,614 (as of 2004), which is about 4% of the Zakarpattia Oblast population. About 50,000 reside in a rural area.

Although ethnic Hungarians are in majority here (76.1%), other ethnic groups are relatively numerous in Berehove Raion. The largest of these are Ukrainians (18.8%), Russians (0.7%), and Romani (4.1%).

== Administrative division ==
The Berehove Raion consists of one town municipality and 30 rural municipalities, all of which also have their respective administrative councils (rada). The administrative center of the district is situated in the city of Berehove which is not part of the district administration. The city of Berehove was designated into a special city municipality of regional significance in 2001. Some of the municipalities of the district consist of several settlements, mostly rural.

Note that most of the settlements regained their original Hungarian names since the Ukrainian independence. Some settlements' names end with o, unlike within the Ukrainian grammar which requires ending e. Those names are traditional and in the local Ukrainian dialect.

Administrative center: Berehove (Beregszász)

Town municipality: Batovo (Batyú)

Rural municipalities:

- Astei (Luzhenka between 1945–1991, Asztély)
- Badalovo (Badaló)
- Batrad (Bótrágy), combines two villages Betrad and Horonhlab (Dzvinkoje between 1920–1938, Kisharangláb)
- Bene (Dobrosillia between 1945–1991, Bene)
- Berehuifalu (Nove Selo between 1920–1938 and 1944–1991, Beregújfalu)
- Borzhava (Velka Borshava between 1920–1938, Nagyborzsova)
- Vary (Variova between 1920–1938, Mezővári)
- Velyka Bakta (Nagybakta)
- Velyki Berehy (Brehy between 1920–1938, Nagybereg)
- Velyka Biyhan (Nagybégány), combines villages of Velyka Byihan and Mala Byihan (Kisbégány)
- Halabor (Bodoliv, between 1945–1991, Halábor)
- Hat (Gát), combines villages of Hat and Chikosh-Horonda (Čikosgorondov Dvor between 1920–1938 and 1944–1945, Csikósgorond)
- Hecha (Mezőgecse)
- Hut (Harazdivka between 1945–1991, Gút)
- Dyida (Beregdéda)
- Zapson (Zastavnoje between 1945–1991, Zápszony)
- Kvasovo (Kovászó)
- Kidyosh (Zmiyivka between 1945–1991, Kigyós)
- Koson (Kosyno between 1945–1995, Mezőkaszony)
- Mochola (Macsola), combines villages of Mochola and Huniadi (Hunyadi)
- Muzhiievo (Nagymuzsaly)
- Nyzhni Remety (Alsóremete), combines villages of Nyzhni Remety and Verkni Remety (Felsőremete)
- Orosiievo (Sárosoroszi)
- Popovo (Csonkapapi), combines villages of Popovo, Male Popovo (Gašparov Dvor between 1920–1938 and 1944–1945, Soniachne between 1945–1991, Tiszatanya or Papitanya), and Heten (Hetin between 1920–1938 and 1944–1945, Lypove between 1945–1991, Hetyen)
- Rafainovo (Rafajna Nové Selo between 1920–1938 and 1944–1945, Rafajnaújfalu)
- Svoboda (Vel'ky Bakos between 1920–1938 and 1944–1945, Nagybakos), combines villages of Svoboda, Badiv (Badótanya), Bakosh (Kisbakos), and Danylivka (Danilovka)
- Chetfalva (Chetovo between 1945–1991, Csetfalva)
- Choma (Tiszacsoma)
- Shom (Derenkovets between 1945–1991, Beregsom), combines villages of Shom and Kashtanovo (Vel'ky Dvor between 1920–1938 and 1944–1945, Vadastanya)
- Yanoshi (Janosovo between 1920–1938, Ivanivka between 1945–1991, Makkosjánosi), combines villages of Yanoshi and Balazher (Blazhejovo between 1920–1938 and 1944–1945, Dzvinkoye between 1945–1991, Balazsér)

Note: Hungarian name of places are given in parentheses.

== Transportation ==
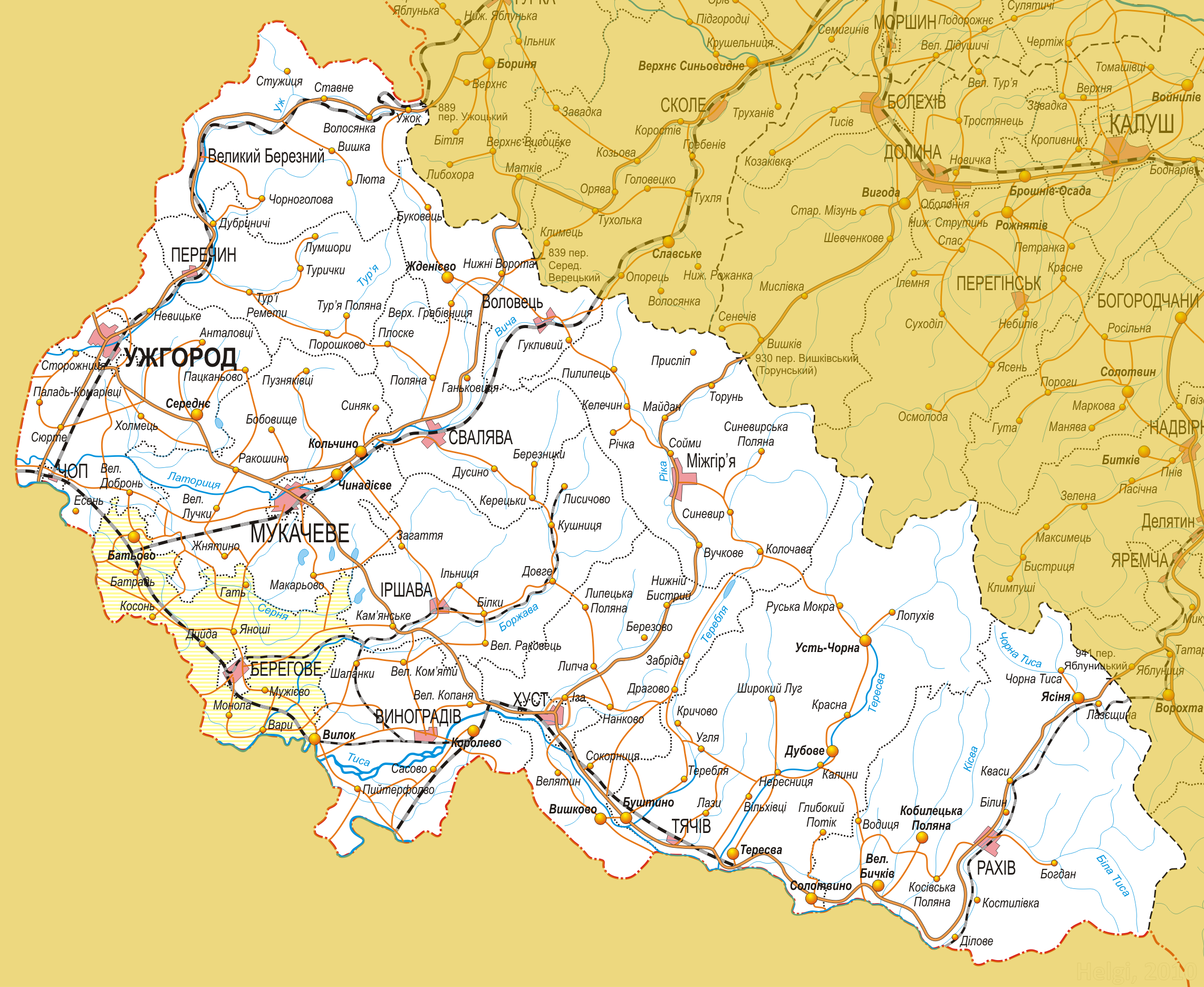
Map of Zakarpattia with pre-2020 Berehove Raion highlighted.

Highways

Through the district runs one of the European route which in fact consists of two different ones and. The highway runs from the north from Mukachevo straight to Berehove after which it continues on south-east along the Hungarian border towards Romania. A regional highway of a state importance P54 branches away from E58/81 in Berehove towards the Hungarian border and in the Astei municipality is going through a border checkpoint traveling towards Jánd (Hungary). From Berehove also originates a national highway that traveling through Vynohradiv heads towards Khust, connecting to H09.

Beside the Astei checkpoint there two others of local importance located in the western portion of the district, one in the Koson municipality, another one in the Batrad.

Out of local highways through the district run such highways as T0714, T0707, T0715, T0731, T0717. The biggest local highway is T0707 which runs through most of the district.

Railroads

There are six railroad stations out of which the stations in Batovo and Berehove are the biggest. The station Batovo, in fact, is situated at the intersection connecting such important cities of the region as Chop, Mukachevo, and Berehove.

== Gallery ==
Coat of arms of Hungarian Bereg County

Coat of arms of Ukrainian Berehove Raion

== See also ==
- Bereg County
- Hungarian plain
- Zakarpattia
