= List of Ukrainian place names affected by derussification =

Since Ukraine declared independence from the Soviet Union on 24 August 1991, many populated places and administrative divisions in the country have had their names changed as part of the derussification of toponyms (place names) in Ukraine. (Note: Many other toponyms have also been affected by derussification, including thousands of street names and the names of numerous geographic and other features. These other renamings are excluded from this list.) These changes have involved the removal of placenames connected to people, places, events, and organizations associated with Russia and Russian imperialism (Note: Due to legal limitations and narrow interpretations of decommunization legislation enacted in 2016 as well as resistance amongst some local authorities to renamings at the time, numerous placenames connected to communism and the Soviet Union continued to remain in place and were only later removed following the adoption of the comprehensive derussification law On the Condemnation and Prohibition of Propaganda of Russian Imperial Policy in Ukraine and the Decolonization of Toponymy in 2023. These placenames associated with communism and removed by derussification legislation are included on this list.) as well as the restoration of historical placenames that had been changed earlier in Ukraine's history by the Russian or Soviet government with the intention of removing local heritage. Derussification has also included the respellings or rewordings of names to match standard spelling and word usages in the Ukrainian language. (Note: Under the Russian Empire, Russian was the sole official language in the country, while the Ukrainian language was suppressed. During the Soviet period, Ukrainian gained the status of a co-official language in the Ukrainian SSR. However, Russian was still generally preferred on the government level, and the standard Ukrainian orthography was heavily russified in 1933. Continuous russification resulted in the spread of the Russian language in Ukraine (which remains the second most spoken language in the country), as well as the formation of Surzhyk, a mixed vernacular language, which is reflected in the spelling of numerous populated places that combine Russian and Ukrainian spelling and grammar. Since the adoption of the Constitution of Ukraine in 1996, Ukrainian has been the country's sole national language while Russian is recognized as a minority language with constitutional guarantees for its "free development, use and protection" in Ukraine alongside the languages of the country's other national minorities. In 1990, 1993, and 2019, the orthography underwent a partial reversal of russification. The Romanization of Ukrainian has also become standardized in 1996, and modified in 2010. Its use for placenames gained prominence internationally after the KyivNotKiev campaign in 2018–2019, popularizing Ukrainian-based spellings such as Kyiv, Kharkiv, Odesa, and Lviv over their Russian-based equivalents of Kiev, Kharkov, Odessa, and Lvov.) The official names of populated places and raions (districts) in the country are determined through legislation passed by the Verkhovna Rada, Ukraine's parliament, typically at the request of local authorities; urban districts are named by each city's municipal council or the oblast (regional) administration. During the Soviet period, particularly in the 1920s and 1930s, officials engaged in a significant renaming campaign to promote Bolshevism, (Note: The first Soviet renaming campaign of the 1920s and 1930s occurred during the interwar period after the defeat and occupation of the Ukrainian People's Republic in 1921 by the Red Army in the Ukrainian–Soviet War. The next major renaming efforts occurred in the aftermath of World War II, in which Soviet Ukraine was expanded to include annexed western regions formerly part of Czechoslovakia (Transcarpathia), Poland (Eastern Galicia and Volhynia), and Romania (Bessarabia and Northern Bukovina), as well as areas ceded by post-war Communist Poland in the 1951 Polish–Soviet territorial exchange. The names imposed by Soviet officials during the renamings of the 1940s, 1950s, and 1960s involved the promotion of communist leaders and symbols in addition to Red Army generals and soldiers who had fought in the war. These two renaming campaigns are the source for many of the names removed by derussification legislation.) replacing thousands of historical placenames in the country of both Russian and Ukrainian origin with generic propaganda toponyms based on prominent communist symbols and figures. In the 1980s, following the Soviet adoption of the liberalizing policies of glasnost and perestroika, Soviet Ukrainian and local governments carried out amongst the first (Note: There were earlier attempts at derussification during the Ukrainian People's Republic's brief existence, when plans were created for the replacement of some names imposed during the Russian Empire, but these changes were never implemented.) limited derussification as they gained greater autonomy, returning some historical placenames and modifying others, notably with the renaming of the city and oblast of Rovno to Rivne on 11 June 1991 to bring it in line with Ukrainian language standards. After independence, derussification efforts were sporadic, with most name changes in the initial decades post-independence resulting from the restoration of pre-Soviet names through local efforts. Following the months-long Euromaidan protests and beginning of the Russo-Ukrainian War in 2014, hundreds of placenames dedicated to communist figures and the Soviet Union were changed as major decommunization legislation was enacted in 2016. However, most Russian names not directly associated with communism or included in the decommunization legislation continued to stay in place as derussification remained less popular than decommunization.

After Russia's full-scale invasion of Ukraine in 2022, derussification gained widespread public support for the first time – even among Russian speakers and residents who had previously disapproved of decommunization – and became part of the Ukrainian government's announced decolonization policies. On 14 March 2023, multiple non-governmental organizations and other groups signed a petition calling for the adoption of derussification laws. In response, the Ukrainian parliament passed on 21 March the law On the Condemnation and Prohibition of Propaganda of Russian Imperial Policy in Ukraine and the Decolonization of Toponymy, the country's first comprehensive derussification legislation, officially prohibiting placenames considered to promote Russian imperialism or the Russification of Ukraine. An official list of placenames not conforming to the Ukrainian language was published on 30 June 2023 by the National Commission on State Language Standards, followed on 3 August by a separate list from the Ukrainian Institute of National Memory of placenames associated with Russian imperialism. Local authorities of affected places were given six months from the publication of each list to submit new name proposals to parliament; (Note: Although the legislation mandated the submission of new names by local communities within six months, an additional three-month period was also given if new names were not adopted by the end of the original six months. If local authorities did not complete the renaming process by nine months, the ability to select a new name was ceded to the regional state administrations—the oblast governments. While the enactment of new names should have largely been completed by July 2024, the renaming process is still ongoing. Cities that are expected to be renamed include Pavlohrad, Pervomaisk, and Synelnykove (due to their connections with Russia or the Soviet Union), as well as Bokovo-Khrustalne, Brovary, Derhachi, Khrustalnyi, and Sorokyne (due to their Russian-influenced spelling). Although Crimea is covered by the derussification laws, the renaming process has not been initiated there as it is envisaged to include public hearings, which are impossible to organize due to the ongoing Russian occupation of Crimea.) localities that did not submit name proposals were renamed directly by parliament based on the Institute's or Commission's recommendations. For certain localities that have placenames that are potentially applicable to renaming, such as the village of Krasnopil in Zhytomyr Oblast, whose name is derived from the color red (a symbol of the Soviet Union) but also dates as early as 1601, name changes are not required. (Note: Other exceptions to derussification provided by the laws include toponyms named after high ranking individuals in historical or modern-day Russia (except officials of Soviet security agencies) that protected or otherwise contributed to the identity, culture, rights, or independence of Ukraine (e.g. Andrei Sakharov); toponyms named for Russian geographical, historical and cultural objects that are related to the culture or history of Ukrainians or the "enslaved peoples" of Russia; and names that are simply similar in appearance to other affected names (e.g. localities with the names Katerynivka or Mykolaivka are only included for renaming if confirmed by historical sources to be named after Russian Tsars).)

As of 7 August 2026, multiple administrative divisions and hundreds of populated places have had their names changed or modified as part of derussification. Many of the name changes occurred on 26 September 2024 following the enactment of a major law formalizing new names for 327 populated places and four raions. Amongst the most common names replaced as part of derussification are those named for the color red, Russian test pilot Valery Chkalov, Soviet Russian author Maxim Gorky, Russian botanist Ivan Michurin, Moscow and other Russian cities, the first of May (celebrated as International Workers' Day), and Russian imperial general Alexander Suvorov. In addition, numerous placenames have had spelling and grammatical adjustments made to their legal names to match Ukrainian language standards, such as with over a dozen localities renamed from Yurivka (Ukrainian: Юр'ївка) to Yuriivka (Юріївка). Of currently existing administrative divisions, (Note: On 18 July 2020, an administrative reform abolished and merged the country's 490 raions into 136 new, expanded raions while also creating 1469 new legal entities called hromadas and establishing them as the subdivisions of raions. This list excludes raions that were abolished in 2020 as well as all hromadas that were affected by derussification.) six raions and twenty urban districts have been affected by derussification post-independence, with the raions being renamed in response to the name changes of their namesake administrative centers. For populated places affected by derussification, most have been rural settlements and villages although 18 cities have also had name changes. Due to the ongoing Russian occupation of parts of Ukraine, the new names for populated places and administrative divisions located in occupied areas have only de jure status while de facto Russian-appointed officials continue to use their pre-derussification names.

== Administrative divisions ==
Renamed raions and urban districts
Old Name	New Name (Note: Ukrainian names link to the Ukrainian Wikipedia articles for each populated place or administrative division.)	Type	Oblast/City	Date (Note: Date the new names entered into force)	Reason for renaming
Novomoskovsk Raion Новомосковський район	Samar Raion; Самарівський район	Raions	Dnipropetrovsk Oblast	26 September 2024	In line with the renaming of its administrative center to Samar
Krasnohrad Raion Красноградський район	Berestyn Raion; Берестинський район	Raions	Kharkiv Oblast	26 September 2024	In line with the renaming of its administrative center to Berestyn
Sievierodonetsk Raion Сєвєродонецький район	Siverskodonetsk Raion; Сіверськодонецький район	Raions	Luhansk Oblast	26 September 2024	In line with the renaming of its administrative center to Siverskodonetsk
Chervonohrad Raion Червоноградський район	Sheptytskyi Raion; Шептицький район	Raions	Lviv Oblast	26 September 2024	In line with the renaming of its administrative center to Sheptytskyi
Volodymyr-Volynskyi Raion Володимир-Волинський район	Volodymyr Raion; Володимирський район	Raions	Volyn Oblast	18 July 2022	In line with the renaming of its administrative center to Volodymyr
Novohrad-Volynskyi Raion Новоград-Волинський район	Zviahel Raion; Звягельський район	Raions	Zhytomyr Oblast	16 November 2022	In line with the renaming of its administrative center to Zviahel
Budonnivskyi District Будьоннівський район	Bohodukhivskyi District; Богодухівський район	Urban districts	Donetsk	26 February 2026	Previously named after Semyon Budyonny
Kalininskyi District Калілінський район	Kalynivskyi District; Калинівський район	Urban districts	Donetsk	26 February 2026	Previously named after Mikhail Kalinin
Kirovskyi District Кіровський район	Rutchenkivskyi District; Рутченківський район	Urban districts	Donetsk	26 February 2026	Previously named after Sergei Kirov
Kuibyshevskyi District Куйбишевський район	Smolianskyi District; Смолянський район	Urban districts	Donetsk	26 February 2026	Previously named after Valerian Kuybyshev
Leninskyi District Ленінський район	Oleksandrivskyi District; Олександрівський район	Urban districts	Donetsk	26 February 2026	Previously named after Vladimir Lenin
Petrovskyi District Петровський район	Voznesenskyi District; Вознесенський район	Urban districts	Donetsk	26 February 2026	Previously named after the Petrovskyi (Grigory Petrovsky) Mine
Proletarskyi District Пролетарський район	Chumakivskyi District; Чумаківський район	Urban districts	Donetsk	26 February 2026	Previously named after the proletariat
Voroshylovskyi District Ворошиловський район	Yuzivskyi District; Юзівський район	Urban districts	Donetsk	26 February 2026	Previously named after Kliment Voroshilov
Kalininskyi District Калінінський район	Kindrativskyi District; Кіндратівський район	Urban districts	Horlivka	26 February 2026	Previously named after Mikhail Kalinin
Moskovskyi District Московський район	Saltivskyi District; Салтівський район	Urban districts	Kharkiv	11 May 2022	Previously named after Moscow
Suvorovskyi District Суворовський район	Tsentralnyi District; Центральний район	Urban districts	Kherson	16 October 2023	Previously named after Alexander Suvorov
Artemivskyi District Артемівський район	Vilkhivskyi District; Вільхівський район	Urban districts	Luhansk	27 February 2026	Previously named after Fyodor Sergeev (Artem)
Leninskyi District Ленінський район	Shevchenkivskyi District; Шевченківський район	Urban districts	Luhansk	27 February 2026	Previously named after Vladimir Lenin
Zhovtnevyi District Жовтневий район	Verhunskyi District; Вергунський район	Urban districts	Luhansk	27 February 2026	Previously named after the October Revolution
Chervonohvardiiskyi District Червоногвардійський район	Berestovskyi District; Берестовський район	Urban districts	Makiivka	26 February 2026	Previously named after the Red Army
Kirovskyi District Кіровський район	Hruzkyi District; Грузький район	Urban districts	Makiivka	26 February 2026	Previously named after Sergei Kirov
Sovietskyi District Совєтський район	Khanzhonkivskyi District; Ханжонківський район	Urban districts	Makiivka	26 February 2026	Previously named after the Soviet
Malynovskyi District Малиновський район	Khadzhybeiskyi District; Хаджибейський район	Urban districts	Odesa	3 May 2023	Previously named after Rodion Malinovsky
Suvorovskyi District Суворовський район	Peresypskyi District; Пересипський район	Urban districts	Odesa	3 May 2023	Previously named after Alexander Suvorov
Komunarskyi District Комунарський район	Kosmichnyi District; Космічний район	Urban districts	Zaporizhzhia	19 November 2025	Previously named after the Komunar (Communard) Factory

== Populated places ==
Derussified populated places in Ukraine
Old Name	New Name	Type (Note: Populated places in Ukraine are divided into three categories: cities, rural settlements, and villages. Urbanized localities as well as settlements of historical significance may be granted city status while rural settlements and villages are generally more rural; cities are typically the most populous followed by rural settlements and villages.)	Raion	Oblast	Date	Reason for renaming (Note: Populated places without an indicated namesake or specific reason for renaming are marked with a dash (—).)
Chervona Sloboda Червона Слобода	Sloboda; Слобода	Village	Cherkasy Raion	Cherkasy Oblast	26 September 2024	Old name alluded to the color red
Ivanivka Іванівка	Yanychi; Яничі	Village	Cherkasy Raion	Cherkasy Oblast	26 September 2024	Previously named after the leader of a Soviet partisan group Ivan Ivankov
Pervomaiske Первомайське	Sosnove; Соснове	Village	Cherkasy Raion	Cherkasy Oblast	26 September 2024	Old name alluded to the First of May and did not match Ukrainian language standards
Dzenzelivka Дзензелівка	Dzendzelivka; Дзендзелівка	Village	Uman Raion	Cherkasy Oblast	18 June 2025	Old name did not match Ukrainian language standards
Kantakuzivka Кантакузівка	Myrovychi; Мировичі	Village	Zolotonosha Raion	Cherkasy Oblast	26 September 2024	Previously named after the Russian Imperial major general Foma Kantakuzen
Novomykolaivka Новомиколаївка	Osavulske; Осавульське	Village	Zolotonosha Raion	Cherkasy Oblast	26 September 2024	Previously named after Nikolai Golitsyn
Pershe Travnia Перше Травня	Kompaniiske; Компанійське	Village	Zolotonosha Raion	Cherkasy Oblast	26 September 2024	Old name alluded to the First of May
Pershotravneve Першотравневе	Novyi Kovrai; Новий Коврай	Village	Zolotonosha Raion	Cherkasy Oblast	26 September 2024	Old name alluded to the First of May
Hanzhalivka Ганжалівка	Gandzhalivka; Ґанджалівка	Village	Zvenyhorodka Raion	Cherkasy Oblast	18 June 2025	Old name did not match Ukrainian language standards
Hudzivka Гудзівка	Gudzivka; Ґудзівка	Village	Zvenyhorodka Raion	Cherkasy Oblast	26 September 2024	Old name did not match Ukrainian language standards
Katerynopil Катеринопіль	Kalynopil; Калинопіль	Rural settlement	Zvenyhorodka Raion	Cherkasy Oblast	26 September 2024	Previously named after Catherine the Great
Iskrene Іскрене	Iskryne; Іскрине	Village	Zvenyhorodka Raion	Cherkasy Oblast	18 June 2025	Old name did not match Ukrainian language standards
Vatutine Ватутіне	Bahacheve; Багачеве	City	Zvenyhorodka Raion	Cherkasy Oblast	26 September 2024	Previously named after Nikolai Vatutin
Aloshynske Альошинське	Zahorodnie; Загороднє	Village	Chernihiv Raion	Chernihiv Oblast	18 June 2025	Old name did not match Ukrainian language standards
Chysti Luzhi Чисті Лужі	Chysti Luky; Чисті Луки	Village	Chernihiv Raion	Chernihiv Oblast	26 September 2024	Old name did not match Ukrainian language standards
Pershe Travnia Перше Травня	Zelenyi Hai; Зелений Гай	Village	Chernihiv Raion	Chernihiv Oblast	26 September 2024	Old name alluded to the First of May
Pushkine Пушкіне	Lisove; Лісове	Village	Chernihiv Raion	Chernihiv Oblast	26 September 2024	Previously named after Alexander Pushkin
Berezova Roshcha Березова Роща	Berezovyi Hai; Березовий Гай	Village	Koriukivka Raion	Chernihiv Oblast	18 June 2025	Old name did not match Ukrainian language standards
Krestopivshchyna Крестопівщина	Khrestopivshchyna; Хрестопівщина	Village	Koriukivka Raion	Chernihiv Oblast	18 June 2025	Old name did not match Ukrainian language standards
Kovalove Ковальове	Kovaleve; Ковалеве	Village	Nizhyn Raion	Chernihiv Oblast	18 June 2025	Old name did not match Ukrainian language standards
Pershe Travnia Перше Травня	Soniachne; Сонячне	Village	Nizhyn Raion	Chernihiv Oblast	26 September 2024	Old name alluded to the First of May
Travkyne Травкине	Travchyne; Травчине	Village	Nizhyn Raion	Chernihiv Oblast	18 June 2025	Old name did not match Ukrainian language standards
Roshcha Роща	Bir; Бір	Village	Novhorod-Siverskyi Raion	Chernihiv Oblast	18 June 2025	Old name did not match Ukrainian language standards
Vostochne Восточне	Ivankiv; Іванків	Village	Novhorod-Siverskyi Raion	Chernihiv Oblast	18 June 2025	Old name did not match Ukrainian language standards
Zelena Roshcha Зелена Роща	Zelena Dibrova; Зелена Діброва	Rural settlement	Novhorod-Siverskyi Raion	Chernihiv Oblast	18 June 2025	Old name did not match Ukrainian language standards
Chervone Червоне	Chorne; Чорне	Village	Pryluky Raion	Chernihiv Oblast	26 September 2024	Old name alluded to the color red
Pershe Travnia Перше Травня	Mikhnovske; Міхновське	Village	Pryluky Raion	Chernihiv Oblast	26 September 2024	Old name alluded to the First of May
Yuzhne Южне	Svitanok; Світанок	Village	Pryluky Raion	Chernihiv Oblast	26 September 2024	Old name did not match Ukrainian language standards
Horkoho Горького	Tytorove; Титорове	Rural settlement	Dnipro Raion	Dnipropetrovsk Oblast	26 September 2024	Previously named after Maxim Gorky
Maivka Маївка	Kalynove; Калинове	Village	Dnipro Raion	Dnipropetrovsk Oblast	26 September 2024	Old name alluded to the First of May
Oleksandropil Олександропіль	Luhove; Лугове	Village	Dnipro Raion	Dnipropetrovsk Oblast	26 September 2024	Previously named after Alexander I of Russia
Partyzanske Партизанське	Orilske; Орільське	Village	Dnipro Raion	Dnipropetrovsk Oblast	26 September 2024	Previously named after Soviet partisans
Pershe Travnia Перше Травня	Kvitneve; Квітневе	Village	Dnipro Raion	Dnipropetrovsk Oblast	26 September 2024	Old name alluded to the First of May
Pershe Travnia Перше Травня	Zoriane; Зоряне	Village	Dnipro Raion	Dnipropetrovsk Oblast	26 September 2024	Old name alluded to the First of May
Pidhorodne Підгородне	Pidhorodnie; Підгороднє	City	Dnipro Raion	Dnipropetrovsk Oblast	18 June 2025	Old name did not match Ukrainian language standards
Yurivka Юр'ївка	Yuriivka; Юріївка	Village	Dnipro Raion	Dnipropetrovsk Oblast	18 June 2025	Old name did not match Ukrainian language standards
Bohdano-Nadezhdivka Богдано-Надеждівка	Bohdano-Nadiivka; Богдано-Надіївка	Village	Kamianske Raion	Dnipropetrovsk Oblast	18 June 2025	Old name did not match Ukrainian language standards
Chkalovka Чкаловка	Chubarivka; Чубарівка	Village	Kamianske Raion	Dnipropetrovsk Oblast	26 September 2024	Previously named after Valery Chkalov
Pershe Travnia Перше Травня	Bohodarivka; Богодарівка	Village	Kamianske Raion	Dnipropetrovsk Oblast	26 September 2024	Old name alluded to the First of May
Pervomaiske Первомайське	Vodiana Balka; Водяна Балка	Village	Kamianske Raion	Dnipropetrovsk Oblast	26 September 2024	Old name alluded to the First of May and did not match Ukrainian language standards
Suvorovske Суворовське	Slobidske; Слобідське	Village	Kamianske Raion	Dnipropetrovsk Oblast	26 September 2024	Previously named after Alexander Suvorov
Vesela Roshcha Весела Роща	Zelenyi Hai; Зелений Гай	Village	Kamianske Raion	Dnipropetrovsk Oblast	26 September 2024	Old name did not match Ukrainian language standards
Chervone Pole Червоне Поле	Pole; Поле	Village	Kryvyi Rih Raion	Dnipropetrovsk Oblast	26 September 2024	Old name alluded to the color red
Chervonyi Yar Червоний Яр	Yar; Яр	Village	Kryvyi Rih Raion	Dnipropetrovsk Oblast	26 September 2024	Old name alluded to the color red
Chervonyi Zaporozhets Червоний Запорожець	Vilnyi Zaporozhets; Вільний Запорожець	Rural settlement	Kryvyi Rih Raion	Dnipropetrovsk Oblast	26 September 2024	Old name alluded to the color red
Chkalovka Чкаловка	Karachunivka; Карачунівка	Village	Kryvyi Rih Raion	Dnipropetrovsk Oblast	26 September 2024	Previously named after Valery Chkalov
Izluchyste Ізлучисте	Promenyste; Променисте	Village	Kryvyi Rih Raion	Dnipropetrovsk Oblast	18 June 2025	Old name did not match Ukrainian language standards
Mala Kostromka Мала Костромка	Mala Dolyna; Мала Долина	Village	Kryvyi Rih Raion	Dnipropetrovsk Oblast	26 September 2024	Previously named after the Russian city of Kostroma
Nadezhdivka Надеждівка	Nova Nadiia; Нова Надія	Village	Kryvyi Rih Raion	Dnipropetrovsk Oblast	18 June 2025	Old name did not match Ukrainian language standards
Novokurske Новокурське	Shchaslyve; Щасливе	Village	Kryvyi Rih Raion	Dnipropetrovsk Oblast	26 September 2024	Previously named after the Russian city of Kursk
Pershe Travnia Перше Травня	Kozatskyi Kut; Козацький Кут	Village	Kryvyi Rih Raion	Dnipropetrovsk Oblast	26 September 2024	Old name alluded to the First of May
Pershe Travnia Перше Травня	Kozatska Sloboda; Козацька Слобода	Village	Kryvyi Rih Raion	Dnipropetrovsk Oblast	26 September 2024	Old name alluded to the First of May
Spokoistviie Спокойствіє	Spokii; Спокій	Village	Kryvyi Rih Raion	Dnipropetrovsk Oblast	26 September 2024	Old name did not match Ukrainian language standards
Suvorovka Суворовка	Blyzniuky; Близнюки	Village	Kryvyi Rih Raion	Dnipropetrovsk Oblast	26 September 2024	Previously named after Alexander Suvorov
Yuzhne Южне	Pivdenne; Південне	Village	Kryvyi Rih Raion	Dnipropetrovsk Oblast	26 September 2024	Old name did not match Ukrainian language standards
Velyka Kostromka Велика Костромка	Velyka Dolyna; Велика Долина	Village	Kryvyi Rih Raion	Dnipropetrovsk Oblast	26 September 2024	Previously named after the Russian city of Kostroma
Chkalove Чкалове	Volia; Воля	Village	Nikopol Raion	Dnipropetrovsk Oblast	26 September 2024	Previously named after Valery Chkalov
Pershotravneve Першотравневе	Mozolevske; Мозолевське	Village	Nikopol Raion	Dnipropetrovsk Oblast	26 September 2024	Old name alluded to the First of May
Novomoskovske Новомосковське	Nove; Нове	Village	Pavlohrad Raion	Dnipropetrovsk Oblast	26 September 2024	Previously named after Moscow
Pervomaiske Первомайське	Sviatotroitske; Святотроїцьке	Village	Pavlohrad Raion	Dnipropetrovsk Oblast	26 September 2024	Old name alluded to the First of May and did not match Ukrainian language standards
Yurivka Юр'ївка	Yuriivka; Юріївка	Rural settlement	Pavlohrad Raion	Dnipropetrovsk Oblast	26 September 2024	Old name did not match Ukrainian language standards
Zhemchuzhne Жемчужне	Yasne; Ясне	Rural settlement	Pavlohrad Raion	Dnipropetrovsk Oblast	18 June 2025	Old name did not match Ukrainian language standards
Hvardiiske Гвардійське	Zarichne; Зарічне	Rural settlement	Novomoskovsk → Samar Raion	Dnipropetrovsk Oblast	26 September 2024	Previously named after the Soviet Guards
Nadezhdivka Надеждівка	Nadiivka; Надіївка	Village	Novomoskovsk → Samar Raion	Dnipropetrovsk Oblast	18 June 2025	Old name did not match Ukrainian language standards
Novomoskovsk Новомосковськ	Samar; Самар	City	Novomoskovsk → Samar Raion	Dnipropetrovsk Oblast	26 September 2024	Previously named after Moscow
Pershotravenka Першотравенка	Liubomyrivka; Любомирівка	Village	Novomoskovsk → Samar Raion	Dnipropetrovsk Oblast	26 September 2024	Old name alluded to the First of May
Hryhorivka Григорівка	Bunchuzhne; Бунчужне	Village	Synelnykove Raion	Dnipropetrovsk Oblast	26 September 2024	Previously named after Grigory Petrovsky
Ilarionove Іларіонове	Yavornytske; Яворницьке	Rural settlement	Synelnykove Raion	Dnipropetrovsk Oblast	26 September 2024	Previously named after Illarion Vorontsov-Dashkov
Krasne Красне	Dolyna; Долина	Village	Synelnykove Raion	Dnipropetrovsk Oblast	26 September 2024	Old name alluded to the color red
Kyrpychne Кирпичне	Tsehelne; Цегельне	Village	Synelnykove Raion	Dnipropetrovsk Oblast	18 June 2025	Old name did not match Ukrainian language standards
Marina Roshcha Мар'їна Роща	Marianivka; Мар'янівка	Village	Synelnykove Raion	Dnipropetrovsk Oblast	18 June 2025	Old name did not match Ukrainian language standards
Nadezhdivka Надеждівка	Nadiia; Надія	Village	Synelnykove Raion	Dnipropetrovsk Oblast	18 June 2025	Old name did not match Ukrainian language standards
Novopavlohradske Новопавлоградське	Novomatviivske; Новоматвіївське	Village	Synelnykove Raion	Dnipropetrovsk Oblast	26 September 2024	Previously named after Paul I of Russia
Novopidhorodne Новопідгородне	Novopidhorodnie; Новопідгороднє	Village	Synelnykove Raion	Dnipropetrovsk Oblast	18 June 2025	Old name did not match Ukrainian language standards
Novyi Posolok Новий Посьолок	Myrne; Мирне	Village	Synelnykove Raion	Dnipropetrovsk Oblast	18 June 2025	Old name did not match Ukrainian language standards
Pershotravensk Першотравенськ	Shakhtarske; Шахтарське	City	Synelnykove Raion	Dnipropetrovsk Oblast	26 September 2024	Old name alluded to the First of May
Pershotravneve Першотравневе	Zlahoda; Злагода	Village	Synelnykove Raion	Dnipropetrovsk Oblast	26 September 2024	Old name alluded to the First of May
Pervomaiske Первомайське	Dobrychi; Добричі	Rural settlement	Synelnykove Raion	Dnipropetrovsk Oblast	26 September 2024	Old name alluded to the First of May and did not match Ukrainian language standards
Pervomaiske Первомайське	Korzhove; Коржове	Village	Synelnykove Raion	Dnipropetrovsk Oblast	26 September 2024	Old name alluded to the First of May and did not match Ukrainian language standards
Voronizke Воронізьке	Serednia Tersa; Середня Терса	Village	Synelnykove Raion	Dnipropetrovsk Oblast	26 September 2024	Previously named after the Russian city of Voronezh
Vozvratne Возвратне	Tsybuliany; Цибуляни	Village	Synelnykove Raion	Dnipropetrovsk Oblast	26 September 2024	Old name did not match Ukrainian language standards
Yanvarske Январське	Sichneve; Січневе	Village	Synelnykove Raion	Dnipropetrovsk Oblast	26 September 2024	Old name did not match Ukrainian language standards
Zelena Roshcha Зелена Роща	Shchaslyve; Щасливе	Village	Synelnykove Raion	Dnipropetrovsk Oblast	18 June 2025	Old name did not match Ukrainian language standards
Novhorodske Новгородське	Niu-York; Нью-Йорк	Rural settlement (Note: Controlled by Russia following the beginning of its full-scale invasion of Ukraine in 2022.)	Bakhmut Raion	Donetsk Oblast	1 July 2021	Renamed under the Soviet Union due to association with New York City
Petrivka Петрівка	Novospaske; Новоспаське	Rural settlement	Bakhmut Raion	Donetsk Oblast	26 September 2024	Previously named after the Russian Imperial statesman Pyotr Passek
Yurivka Юр'ївка	Yuriivka; Юріївка	Village	Bakhmut Raion	Donetsk Oblast	18 June 2025	Old name did not match Ukrainian language standards
Kuteinykove Кутейникове	Popova Balka; Попова Балка	Rural settlement (Note: Controlled by the pro-Russian Donetsk People's Republic and Russia since 2014–2015 following the Donbas war.)	Donetsk Raion	Donetsk Oblast	26 September 2024	—
Novomoskovske Новомосковське	Tykhe; Тихе	Rural settlement	Donetsk Raion	Donetsk Oblast	26 September 2024	Previously named after Moscow
Moskovske Московське	Kulykivske; Куликівське	Rural settlement	Horlivka Raion	Donetsk Oblast	26 September 2024	Previously named after Moscow
Orlovo-Ivanivka Орлово-Іванівка	Sulynivka; Сулинівка	Village	Horlivka Raion	Donetsk Oblast	26 September 2024	—
Huselshchykove Гусельщикове	Huselnykove; Гусельникове	Village	Kalmiuske Raion	Donetsk Oblast	18 June 2025	Old name did not match Ukrainian language standards
Michurine Мічуріне	Hrintal; Грінталь	Village	Kalmiuske Raion	Donetsk Oblast	26 September 2024	Previously named after Ivan Michurin
Pervomaiske Первомайське	Chorne; Чорне	Village	Kalmiuske Raion	Donetsk Oblast	26 September 2024	Old name alluded to the First of May and did not match Ukrainian language standards
Pervomaiske Первомайське	Kamianuvate; Кам'янувате	Village	Kalmiuske Raion	Donetsk Oblast	26 September 2024	Old name alluded to the First of May and did not match Ukrainian language standards
Pervomaiske Первомайське	Palanka; Паланка	Village	Kalmiuske Raion	Donetsk Oblast	26 September 2024	Old name alluded to the First of May and did not match Ukrainian language standards
Petrivske Петрівське	Stakhivske; Стахівське	Village	Kalmiuske Raion	Donetsk Oblast	26 September 2024	—
Petrivske Петрівське	Zvytiazhne; Звитяжне	Village	Kalmiuske Raion	Donetsk Oblast	26 September 2024	—
Tavrycheske Тавричеське	Tavriiske; Таврійське	Village	Kalmiuske Raion	Donetsk Oblast	18 June 2025	Old name did not match Ukrainian language standards
Vaniushkyne Ванюшкине	Frolivske; Фролівське	Village	Kalmiuske Raion	Donetsk Oblast	26 September 2024	—
Andriivka Андріївка	Sukhanivka; Суханівка	Rural settlement	Kramatorsk Raion	Donetsk Oblast	26 September 2024	Previously named after the collective farm owner Andrii Petrunchyk
Nadezhdivka Надеждівка	Nadiia; Надія	Village	Kramatorsk Raion	Donetsk Oblast	26 September 2024	Old name did not match Ukrainian language standards
Prelesne Прелесне	Prylisne; Прилісне	Village	Kramatorsk Raion	Donetsk Oblast	18 June 2025	Old name did not match Ukrainian language standards
Boiove Бойове	Sviato-Pokrovske; Свято-Покровське	Village	Mariupol Raion	Donetsk Oblast	18 June 2025	—
Nikolske Нікольське	Mykilske; Микільське	Rural settlement	Mariupol Raion	Donetsk Oblast	26 September 2024	Old name did not match Ukrainian language standards
Novokrasnivka Новокраснівка	Yamburh; Ямбург	Village	Mariupol Raion	Donetsk Oblast	18 June 2025	Old name alluded to the color red; renamed under the Soviet Union in an attempt to erase Dutch heritage
Peremoha Перемога	Stepove; Степове	Village	Mariupol Raion	Donetsk Oblast	18 June 2025	—
Pervomaiske Первомайське	Domakha; Домаха	Village	Mariupol Raion	Donetsk Oblast	26 September 2024	Old name alluded to the First of May and did not match Ukrainian language standards
Pyshchevyk Пищевик	Kalmiuske; Кальміуське	Village	Mariupol Raion	Donetsk Oblast	18 June 2025	Old name did not match Ukrainian language standards
Respublika Республіка	Berhtal; Бергталь	Village	Mariupol Raion	Donetsk Oblast	18 June 2025	Old name contained Soviet symbolism; renamed under the Soviet Union in an attempt to erase Dutch heritage
Yurivka Юр'ївка	Yuriivka; Юріївка	Village	Mariupol Raion	Donetsk Oblast	18 June 2025	Old name did not match Ukrainian language standards
Zamozhne Заможне	Chermalyk; Чермалик	Village	Mariupol Raion	Donetsk Oblast	15 December 1999	Renamed under the Soviet Union in an attempt to erase Greek heritage
Zoria Зоря	Afiny; Афіни	Village	Mariupol Raion	Donetsk Oblast	26 September 2024	Previously named after the red star; renamed under the Soviet Union in an attempt to erase Greek heritage
Krasnohorivka Красногорівка	Yasnohorivka; Ясногорівка	Village	Pokrovsk Raion	Donetsk Oblast	26 September 2024	Old name alluded to the color red
Krasnoiarske Красноярське	Chernihivka; Чернігівка	Rural settlement	Pokrovsk Raion	Donetsk Oblast	26 September 2024	Previously named after the Russian city of Krasnoyarsk
Kutuzovka Кутузовка	Stepy; Степи	Village	Pokrovsk Raion	Donetsk Oblast	26 September 2024	Previously named after Mikhail Kutuzov
Lastochkyne Ласточкине	Krynychne; Криничне	Rural settlement	Pokrovsk Raion	Donetsk Oblast	26 September 2024	Old name did not match Ukrainian language standards
Moskovske Московське	Kozatske; Козацьке	Village	Pokrovsk Raion	Donetsk Oblast	26 September 2024	Previously named after Moscow
Nadezhdynka Надеждинка	Nadiivka; Надіївка	Rural settlement	Pokrovsk Raion	Donetsk Oblast	26 September 2024	Old name did not match Ukrainian language standards
Novozhelanne Новожеланне	Bazhane; Бажане	Village	Pokrovsk Raion	Donetsk Oblast	26 September 2024	Old name did not match Ukrainian language standards
Novyi Trud Новий Труд	Vidrodzhennia; Відродження	Village	Pokrovsk Raion	Donetsk Oblast	26 September 2024	Old name alluded to communist symbolism of socialist labor
Nykanorivka Никанорівка	Zapovidne; Заповідне	Village	Pokrovsk Raion	Donetsk Oblast	26 September 2024	Previously named after a revolutionary committee leader Nykanor Skoryk
Pershe Travnia Перше Травня	Leontovychi; Леонтовичі	Rural settlement	Pokrovsk Raion	Donetsk Oblast	26 September 2024	Old name alluded to the First of May
Pervomaiske Первомайське	Avdiivske; Авдіївське	Village	Pokrovsk Raion	Donetsk Oblast	26 September 2024	Old name alluded to the First of May and did not match Ukrainian language standards
Pervomaiske Первомайське	Myrove; Мирове	Village	Pokrovsk Raion	Donetsk Oblast	26 September 2024	Old name alluded to the First of May and did not match Ukrainian language standards
Pobieda Побєда	Peremoha; Перемога	Village	Pokrovsk Raion	Donetsk Oblast	18 June 2025	Old name did not match Ukrainian language standards
Pushkine Пушкіне	Chumatske; Чумацьке	Rural settlement	Pokrovsk Raion	Donetsk Oblast	26 September 2024	Previously named after Alexander Pushkin
Sieverne Сєверне	Pivnichne; Північне	Rural settlement	Pokrovsk Raion	Donetsk Oblast	26 September 2024	Old name did not match Ukrainian language standards
Skuchne Скучне	Soniachne; Сонячне	Village	Pokrovsk Raion	Donetsk Oblast	26 September 2024	Old name did not match Ukrainian language standards
Suvorove Суворове	Zatyshok; Затишок	Village	Pokrovsk Raion	Donetsk Oblast	26 September 2024	Previously named after the Suvorov noble family
Voskhod Восход	Skhidne; Східне	Rural settlement	Pokrovsk Raion	Donetsk Oblast	26 September 2024	Old name did not match Ukrainian language standards
Yurivka Юр'ївка	Yuriivka; Юріївка	Village	Pokrovsk Raion	Donetsk Oblast	26 September 2024	Old name did not match Ukrainian language standards
Yurivka Юр'ївка	Yuriivske; Юріївське	Village	Pokrovsk Raion	Donetsk Oblast	18 June 2025	Old name did not match Ukrainian language standards
Zhelanne Желанне	Blahodatne; Благодатне	Rural settlement	Pokrovsk Raion	Donetsk Oblast	26 September 2024	Old name did not match Ukrainian language standards
Zhelanne Druhe Желанне Друге	Bazhane Druhe; Бажане Друге	Village	Pokrovsk Raion	Donetsk Oblast	26 September 2024	Old name did not match Ukrainian language standards
Zhelanne Pershe Желанне Перше	Bazhane Pershe; Бажане Перше	Village	Pokrovsk Raion	Donetsk Oblast	26 September 2024	Old name did not match Ukrainian language standards
Iskra Іскра	Andriivka-Klevtsove; Андріївка-Клевцове	Village	Volnovakha Raion	Donetsk Oblast	26 September 2024	Previously named after the Iskra newspaper
Krasna Poliana Красна Поляна	Nova Karakuba; Нова Каракуба	Village	Volnovakha Raion	Donetsk Oblast	26 September 2024	Old name alluded to the color red
Petrivske Петрівське	Davydovske; Давидовське	Village	Volnovakha Raion	Donetsk Oblast	26 September 2024	—
Tolstoi Толстой	Tovste; Товсте	Village	Volnovakha Raion	Donetsk Oblast	18 June 2025	Old name did not match Ukrainian language standards
Yaremcha Яремча	Yaremche; Яремче	City	Nadvirna Raion	Ivano-Frankivsk Oblast	14 December 2006	Old name did not match Ukrainian language standards
Dar-Nadezhda Дар-Надежда	Dar Nadii; Дар Надії	Village	Krasnohrad → Berestyn Raion	Kharkiv Oblast	18 June 2025	Old name did not match Ukrainian language standards
Krasnohrad Красноград	Berestyn; Берестин	City	Krasnohrad → Berestyn Raion	Kharkiv Oblast	26 September 2024	Old name alluded to the color red
Nadezhdyne Надеждине	Korniivka; Корніївка	Village	Krasnohrad → Berestyn Raion	Kharkiv Oblast	18 June 2025	Old name did not match Ukrainian language standards
Oliinyky Олійники	Motuzivka; Мотузівка	Village	Krasnohrad → Berestyn Raion	Kharkiv Oblast	26 September 2024	Previously named after the Communist soldier P. Oliinyk
Pershotravneve Першотравневе	Molodizhne; Молодіжне	Village	Krasnohrad → Berestyn Raion	Kharkiv Oblast	26 September 2024	Old name alluded to the First of May
Pershotravneve Першотравневе	Myrne; Мирне	Village	Krasnohrad → Berestyn Raion	Kharkiv Oblast	26 September 2024	Old name alluded to the First of May
Horkoho Горького	Shchaslyve; Щасливе	Rural settlement	Bohodukhiv Raion	Kharkiv Oblast	26 September 2024	Previously named after Maxim Gorky
Landyshove Ландишове	Konvalii; Конвалії	Village	Bohodukhiv Raion	Kharkiv Oblast	18 June 2025	Old name did not match Ukrainian language standards
Michurinske Мічурінське	Symyrenkivske; Симиренківське	Village	Bohodukhiv Raion	Kharkiv Oblast	26 September 2024	Previously named after Ivan Michurin
Moika Мойка	Myika; Мийка	Village	Bohodukhiv Raion	Kharkiv Oblast	18 June 2025	Old name did not match Ukrainian language standards
Oleksandrivka Олександрівка	Klynova-Novoselivka; Клинова-Новоселівка	Village	Bohodukhiv Raion	Kharkiv Oblast	26 September 2024	Previously named after Alexander II of Russia
Pershotravneve Першотравневе	Karlivka; Карлівка	Village	Bohodukhiv Raion	Kharkiv Oblast	26 September 2024	Old name alluded to the First of May
Pershotravneve Першотравневе	Mandrychyne; Мандричине	Rural settlement	Bohodukhiv Raion	Kharkiv Oblast	26 September 2024	Old name alluded to the First of May
Pershotravneve Першотравневе	Ridne; Рідне	Rural settlement	Bohodukhiv Raion	Kharkiv Oblast	26 September 2024	Old name alluded to the First of May
Pervukhynka Первухинка	Lisove; Лісове	Village	Bohodukhiv Raion	Kharkiv Oblast	26 September 2024	Previously named after the Bolshevik K. Pervukhin
Shyhymahyne Шигимагине	Shyhymazhyne; Шигимажине	Village	Bohodukhiv Raion	Kharkiv Oblast	18 June 2025	Old name did not match Ukrainian language standards
Tsepochkyne Цепочкине	Bardakivka; Бардаківка	Village	Bohodukhiv Raion	Kharkiv Oblast	26 September 2024	Old name did not match Ukrainian language standards
Chkalovske Чкаловське	Prolisne; Пролісне	Rural settlement	Chuhuiv Raion	Kharkiv Oblast	26 September 2024	Previously named after Valery Chkalov
Dehtiarne Дегтярне	Dihtiarne; Дігтярне	Village	Chuhuiv Raion	Kharkiv Oblast	18 June 2025	Old name did not match Ukrainian language standards
Korobochkyne Коробочкине	Korobchyne; Коробчине	Village	Chuhuiv Raion	Kharkiv Oblast	26 September 2024	Old name did not match Ukrainian language standards
Pershotravneve Першотравневе	Veleten; Велетень	Village	Chuhuiv Raion	Kharkiv Oblast	26 September 2024	Old name alluded to the First of May
Pershotravneve Першотравневе	Zatoka; Затока	Village	Chuhuiv Raion	Kharkiv Oblast	26 September 2024	Old name alluded to the First of May
Rybalkyne Рибалкине	Rybalchyne; Рибалчине	Village	Chuhuiv Raion	Kharkiv Oblast	18 June 2025	Old name did not match Ukrainian language standards
Chervonyi Shliakh Червоний Шлях	Siverske; Сіверське	Village	Izium Raion	Kharkiv Oblast	26 September 2024	Old name alluded to the color red
Pershotravneve Першотравневе	Stepy; Степи	Rural settlement	Izium Raion	Kharkiv Oblast	26 September 2024	Old name alluded to the First of May
Pershotravneve Першотравневе	Zatyshne; Затишне	Village	Izium Raion	Kharkiv Oblast	26 September 2024	Old name alluded to the First of May
Pervomaiske Первомайське	Yanokhine; Янохіне	Village	Izium Raion	Kharkiv Oblast	26 September 2024	Old name alluded to the First of May and did not match Ukrainian language standards
Synycheno Синичино	Synychyne; Синичине	Village	Izium Raion	Kharkiv Oblast	18 June 2025	Old name did not match Ukrainian language standards
Kotliary Котляри	Kotliari; Котлярі	Village	Kharkiv Raion	Kharkiv Oblast	18 June 2025	Old name did not match Ukrainian language standards
Pershotravneve Першотравневе	Naukove; Наукове	Rural settlement	Kharkiv Raion	Kharkiv Oblast	26 September 2024	Old name alluded to the First of May
Prelesne Прелесне	Prylisne; Прилісне	Rural settlement	Kharkiv Raion	Kharkiv Oblast	18 June 2025	Old name did not match Ukrainian language standards
Stara Moskovka Стара Московка	Dzherelne; Джерельне	Village	Kharkiv Raion	Kharkiv Oblast	26 September 2024	Previously named after Moscow
Anyskyne Анискине	Anyshchyne; Анищине	Village	Kupiansk Raion	Kharkiv Oblast	18 June 2025	Old name did not match Ukrainian language standards
Bezmiatezhne Безмятежне	Mlynky; Млинки	Village	Kupiansk Raion	Kharkiv Oblast	18 June 2025	Old name did not match Ukrainian language standards
Ivashkyne Івашкине	Ivashchyne; Іващине	Village	Kupiansk Raion	Kharkiv Oblast	18 June 2025	Old name did not match Ukrainian language standards
Kurochkyne Курочкине	Kurochchyne; Куроччине	Village	Kupiansk Raion	Kharkiv Oblast	18 June 2025	Old name did not match Ukrainian language standards
Mechnikove Мечнікове	Mechnykove; Мечникове	Village	Kupiansk Raion	Kharkiv Oblast	18 June 2025	Old name did not match Ukrainian language standards
Moskovka Московка	Myrove; Мирове	Village	Kupiansk Raion	Kharkiv Oblast	18 June 2025	Previously named after Moscow
Pershotravneve Першотравневе	Manuilivka; Мануйлівка	Village	Kupiansk Raion	Kharkiv Oblast	26 September 2024	Old name alluded to the First of May
Pervomaiske Первомайське	Myrne; Мирне	Village	Kupiansk Raion	Kharkiv Oblast	26 September 2024	Old name alluded to the First of May and did not match Ukrainian language standards
Yurivka Юр'ївка	Yuriivka; Юріївка	Village	Kupiansk Raion	Kharkiv Oblast	18 June 2025	Old name did not match Ukrainian language standards
Morokyne Морокине	Morochyne; Морочине	Village	Lozova Raion	Kharkiv Oblast	18 June 2025	Old name did not match Ukrainian language standards
Nadezhdivka Надеждівка	Nadiivka; Nadiivka	Village	Lozova Raion	Kharkiv Oblast	18 June 2025	Old name did not match Ukrainian language standards
Nadezhdyne Надеждине	Nadiine; Надіїне	Village	Lozova Raion	Kharkiv Oblast	18 June 2025	Old name did not match Ukrainian language standards
Nadezhdyne Надеждине	Nadiine; Надійне	Village	Lozova Raion	Kharkiv Oblast	18 June 2025	Old name did not match Ukrainian language standards
Novonadezhdyne Новонадеждине	Novovolodymyrske; Нововолодимирське	Village	Lozova Raion	Kharkiv Oblast	18 June 2025	Old name did not match Ukrainian language standards
Paniutyne Панютине	Lymanivka; Лиманівка	Rural settlement	Lozova Raion	Kharkiv Oblast	26 September 2024	Previously named after the Russian Imperial major general Vasily Panyutin
Pervomaiskyi Первомайський	Zlatopil; Златопіль	City	Lozova Raion	Kharkiv Oblast	26 September 2024	Old name alluded to the First of May and did not match Ukrainian language standards
Pobieda Побєда	Ridne; Рідне	Village	Lozova Raion	Kharkiv Oblast	18 June 2025	Old name did not match Ukrainian language standards
Valerianovka Валер'яновка	Valerianivka; Валер'янівка	Village	Lozova Raion	Kharkiv Oblast	18 June 2025	Old name did not match Ukrainian language standards
Chervona Liudmylivka Червона Людмилівка	Liudmylivka; Людмилівка	Village	Beryslav Raion	Kherson Oblast	18 June 2025	Old name alluded the color red
Chkalove Чкалове	Stiike; Стійке	Village	Beryslav Raion	Kherson Oblast	26 September 2024	Previously named after Valery Chkalov
Krasnoliubetsk Краснолюбецьк	Kokhanivka; Коханівка	Village	Beryslav Raion	Kherson Oblast	26 September 2024	Old name alluded to the color red
Maksyma Horkoho Максима Горького	Sahaidachne; Сагайдачне	Village	Beryslav Raion	Kherson Oblast	26 September 2024	Previously named after Maxim Gorky
Nova Kaluha Нова Калуга	Mykhailiv; Михайлів	Village	Beryslav Raion	Kherson Oblast	26 September 2024	Previously named after the Russian city of Kaluga
Nova Kaluha Druha Нова Калуга Друга	Novomykhailiv; Новомихайлів	Village	Beryslav Raion	Kherson Oblast	26 September 2024	Previously named after the Russian city of Kaluga
Olhyne Ольгине	Olzhyne; Ольжине	Village	Beryslav Raion	Kherson Oblast	26 September 2024	Old name did not match Ukrainian language standards
Pershotravneve Першотравневе	Vilne; Вільне	Village	Beryslav Raion	Kherson Oblast	26 September 2024	Old name alluded to the First of May
Pervomaiske Первомайське	Soniachne; Сонячне	Village	Beryslav Raion	Kherson Oblast	18 June 2025	Old name alluded to the First of May and did not match Ukrainian language standards
Potomkyne Потьомкине	Nezlamne; Незламне	Village	Beryslav Raion	Kherson Oblast	26 September 2024	Previously named after Grigory Potemkin
Chkalove Чкалове	Dornburh; Дорнбург	Village	Henichesk Raion	Kherson Oblast	26 September 2024	Previously named after Valery Chkalov; renamed under the Soviet Union in an attempt to erase German heritage
Komunarske Комунарське	Kozatske; Козацьке	Rural settlement	Henichesk Raion	Kherson Oblast	26 September 2024	Previously named after the Communards
Muraveinyk Муравейник	Murashnyk; Мурашник	Village	Henichesk Raion	Kherson Oblast	18 June 2025	Old name did not match Ukrainian language standards
Pershotravneve Першотравневе	Khliborobne; Хліборобне	Village	Henichesk Raion	Kherson Oblast	18 June 2025	Old name alluded to the First of May
Zmahannia Змагання	Urozhaine; Урожайне	Village	Henichesk Raion	Kherson Oblast	18 June 2025	—
Kniaze-Hryhorivka Князе-Григорівка	Kozatska Sloboda; Козацька Слобода	Village	Kakhovka Raion	Kherson Oblast	26 September 2024	Previously named after Grigory Potemkin
Nadezhdivka Надеждівка	Nadiivka; Надіївка	Village	Kakhovka Raion	Kherson Oblast	26 September 2024	Old name did not match Ukrainian language standards
Pervomaivka Первомайка	Tykhyi Lyman; Тихий Лиман	Village	Kakhovka Raion	Kherson Oblast	26 September 2024	Old name alluded to the First of May and did not match Ukrainian language standards
Pytomnyk Питомник	Chumatske; Чумацьке	Rural settlement	Kakhovka Raion	Kherson Oblast	26 September 2024	Old name did not match Ukrainian language standards
Skvortsivka Скворцівка	Zolotave; Золотаве	Village	Kakhovka Raion	Kherson Oblast	18 June 2025	Old name did not match Ukrainian language standards
Chaikyne Чайкине	Chaichyne; Чайчине	Village	Kherson Raion	Kherson Oblast	18 June 2025	Old name did not match Ukrainian language standards
Nadezhdivka Надеждівка	Nadiivka; Надіївка	Village	Kherson Raion	Kherson Oblast	18 June 2025	Old name did not match Ukrainian language standards
Pervomaiske Первомайське	Nezlamne; Незламне	Rural settlement	Kherson Raion	Kherson Oblast	26 September 2024	Old name alluded to the First of May and did not match Ukrainian language standards
Poima Пойма	Zaplava; Заплава	Rural settlement	Kherson Raion	Kherson Oblast	26 September 2024	Old name did not match Ukrainian language standards
Maksyma Horkoho Максима Горького	Shchaslyve; Щасливе	Village	Skadovsk Raion	Kherson Oblast	26 September 2024	Previously named after Maxim Gorky
Novorosiiske Новоросійське	Siabry; Сябри	Village	Skadovsk Raion	Kherson Oblast	26 September 2024	Previously named after Novorossiya
Suvorovka Суворовка	Chumaky; Чумаки	Village	Skadovsk Raion	Kherson Oblast	26 September 2024	Previously named after Alexander Suvorov
Chervona Dibrova Червона Діброва	Zavalivska Dibrova; Завалівська Діброва	Village	Kamianets-Podilskyi Raion	Khmelnytskyi Oblast	26 September 2024	Old name alluded to the color red
Aniutyne Анютине	Hannusyne; Ганнусине	Village	Khmelnytskyi Raion	Khmelnytskyi Oblast	18 June 2025	Old name did not match Ukrainian language standards
Chervona Dubyna Червона Дубина	Turshchyna; Турщина	Village	Khmelnytskyi Raion	Khmelnytskyi Oblast	26 September 2024	Old name alluded to the color red
Chervonyi Kut Червоний Кут	Kut; Кут	Village	Khmelnytskyi Raion	Khmelnytskyi Oblast	18 June 2025	Old name alluded to the color red
Chervonyi Ostriv Червоний Острів	Ostriv; Острів	Village	Khmelnytskyi Raion	Khmelnytskyi Oblast	18 June 2025	Old name alluded to the color red
Chervonyi Sluch Червоний Случ	Slutske; Слуцьке	Village	Khmelnytskyi Raion	Khmelnytskyi Oblast	26 September 2024	Old name alluded to the color red
Kushnyrivka Кушнирівка	Kushnirivka; Кушнірівка	Village	Khmelnytskyi Raion	Khmelnytskyi Oblast	26 September 2024	Old name did not match Ukrainian language standards
Kushnyrivska Slobidka Кушнирівська Слобідка	Kushnirivska Slobidka; Кушнірівська Слобідка	Village	Khmelnytskyi Raion	Khmelnytskyi Oblast	26 September 2024	Old name did not match Ukrainian language standards
Moskalivka Москалівка	Malovnyche; Мальовниче	Village	Khmelnytskyi Raion	Khmelnytskyi Oblast	18 June 2025	Previously named after Moscow
Pershotravneve Першотравневе	Berezivka; Березівка	Village	Khmelnytskyi Raion	Khmelnytskyi Oblast	26 September 2024	Old name alluded to the First of May
Rosiiska Buda Російська Буда	Rozsokhska Buda; Розсохська Буда	Village	Khmelnytskyi Raion	Khmelnytskyi Oblast	26 September 2024	Previously named after Russia
Chervone Червоне	Andriivka; Андріївка	Village	Shepetivka Raion	Khmelnytskyi Oblast	26 September 2024	Old name alluded to the color red
Chervone Червоне	Kalynove; Калинове	Village	Shepetivka Raion	Khmelnytskyi Oblast	26 September 2024	Old name alluded to the color red
Smorshky Сморшки	Zmorshky; Зморшки	Village	Shepetivka Raion	Khmelnytskyi Oblast	26 September 2024	Old name did not match Ukrainian language standards
Nadezhdivka Надеждівка	Nadiivka; Надіївка	Village	Holovanivsk Raion	Kirovohrad Oblast	18 June 2025	Old name did not match Ukrainian language standards
Aprelivka Апрелівка	Makiivka; Макіївка	Village	Kropyvnytskyi Raion	Kirovohrad Oblast	18 June 2025	Old name did not match Ukrainian language standards
Aprelivske Апрелівське	Kvitneve; Квітневе	Village	Kropyvnytskyi Raion	Kirovohrad Oblast	18 June 2025	Old name did not match Ukrainian language standards
Liubo-Nadezhdivka Любо-Надеждівка	Liubo-Nadiivka; Любо-Надіївка	Village	Kropyvnytskyi Raion	Kirovohrad Oblast	18 June 2025	Old name did not match Ukrainian language standards
Maiske Майське	Haiok; Гайок	Village	Kropyvnytskyi Raion	Kirovohrad Oblast	18 June 2025	Old name alluded to the First of May
Novhorodka Новгородка	Kamianets; Кам'янець	Rural settlement	Kropyvnytskyi Raion	Kirovohrad Oblast	26 September 2024	Previously named after the Russian city of Novgorod
Novosamara Новосамара	Kolodiazi; Колодязі	Village	Kropyvnytskyi Raion	Kirovohrad Oblast	18 June 2025	Previously named after the Russian city of Samara
Pershe Travnia Перше Травня	Zdorivka; Здорівка	Village	Kropyvnytskyi Raion	Kirovohrad Oblast	26 September 2024	Old name alluded to the First of May
Pershotravenka Першотравенка	Ternove; Тернове	Village	Kropyvnytskyi Raion	Kirovohrad Oblast	26 September 2024	Old name alluded to the First of May
Pershotravneve Першотравневе	Pelaheivka; Пелагеївка	Rural settlement	Kropyvnytskyi Raion	Kirovohrad Oblast	26 September 2024	Old name alluded to the First of May
Sablyne Саблине	Shablyne; Шаблине	Village	Kropyvnytskyi Raion	Kirovohrad Oblast	18 June 2025	Old name did not match Ukrainian language standards
Trudoliubivka Трудолюбівка	Andriivka; Андріївка	Village	Kropyvnytskyi Raion	Kirovohrad Oblast	18 June 2025	Old name alluded to communist symbolism of socialist labor
Udarne Ударне	Vodneve; Водневе	Village	Kropyvnytskyi Raion	Kirovohrad Oblast	18 June 2025	Previously named after Udarniks
Yelyzavethradka Єлизаветградка	Haidamatske; Гайдамацьке	Rural settlement	Kropyvnytskyi Raion	Kirovohrad Oblast	26 September 2024	Previously named after Elizabeth of Russia
Yuzhne Южне	Hai; Гаї	Rural settlement	Kropyvnytskyi Raion	Kirovohrad Oblast	18 June 2025	Old name did not match Ukrainian language standards
Yurivka Юр'ївка	Yuriivka; Юріївка	Village	Kropyvnytskyi Raion	Kirovohrad Oblast	18 June 2025	Old name did not match Ukrainian language standards
Pervomaisk Первомайськ	Stantsiia Tashlyk; Станція Ташлик	Village	Novoukrainka Raion	Kirovohrad Oblast	26 September 2024	Old name alluded to the First of May and did not match Ukrainian language standards
Pervomaiske Первомайське	Valuivka; Валуївка	Village	Novoukrainka Raion	Kirovohrad Oblast	26 September 2024	Old name alluded to the First of May and did not match Ukrainian language standards
Yurivka Юр'ївка	Yuriivka; Юріївка	Village	Novoukrainka Raion	Kirovohrad Oblast	18 June 2025	Old name did not match Ukrainian language standards
Yurivka Юр'ївка	Yuriivka; Юріївка	Village	Novoukrainka Raion	Kirovohrad Oblast	18 June 2025	Old name did not match Ukrainian language standards
Zashchyta Защита	Zakhyst; Захист	Village	Novoukrainka Raion	Kirovohrad Oblast	18 June 2025	Old name did not match Ukrainian language standards
Balakhivka Балахівка	Inhuletske; Інгулецьке	Rural settlement	Oleksandriia Raion	Kirovohrad Oblast	26 September 2024	Previously named after the Soviet military leader Artem Balakhov
Ovrahove Оврагове	Ovrakhove; Оврахове	Village	Oleksandriia Raion	Kirovohrad Oblast	18 June 2025	Old name did not match Ukrainian language standards
Pershotravneve Першотравневе	Starohannivka; Староганнівка	Village	Oleksandriia Raion	Kirovohrad Oblast	26 September 2024	Old name alluded to the First of May
Chervoni Yary Червоні Яри	Khreshchatyi Yar; Хрещатий Яр	Village	Bila Tserkva Raion	Kyiv Oblast	26 September 2024	Old name alluded to the color red
Pershe Travnia Перше Травня	Roska; Роська	Village	Bila Tserkva Raion	Kyiv Oblast	26 September 2024	Old name alluded to the First of May
Pershotravneve Першотравневе	Vyhovske; Виговське	Village	Bila Tserkva Raion	Kyiv Oblast	26 September 2024	Old name alluded to the First of May
Pereiaslav-Khmelnytskyi Переяслав-Хмельницький	Pereiaslav; Переяслав	City	Boryspil Raion	Kyiv Oblast	30 October 2019	Renamed due to the old name's history in the Pereiaslav Agreement promoting Russo-Ukrainian solidarity
Pershe Travnia Перше Травня	Kniazhe; Княже	Village	Boryspil Raion	Kyiv Oblast	26 September 2024	Old name alluded to the First of May
Peremozhets Переможець	Sotnytske; Сотницьке	Village	Brovary Raion	Kyiv Oblast	26 September 2024	—
Pershe Travnia Перше Травня	Dymivka; Димівка	Village	Brovary Raion	Kyiv Oblast	26 September 2024	Old name alluded to the First of May
Pershotravneve Першотравневе	Dymivske; Димівське	Village	Brovary Raion	Kyiv Oblast	26 September 2024	Old name alluded to the First of May
Hvardiiske Гвардійське	Kozatske; Козацьке	Village	Fastiv Raion	Kyiv Oblast	26 September 2024	Previously named after the Soviet Guards
Krasna Slobidka Красна Слобідка	Slobidka; Слобідка	Village	Obukhiv Raion	Kyiv Oblast	26 September 2024	Old name alluded to the color red
Pershe Travnia Перше Травня	Hudymove; Гудимове	Village	Obukhiv Raion	Kyiv Oblast	26 September 2024	Old name alluded to the First of May
Chkalovka Чкаловка	Vyshova; Вишова	Village	Vyshhorod Raion	Kyiv Oblast	26 September 2024	Previously named after Valery Chkalov
Kamenka Каменка	Kamianka; Кам'янка	Village	Vyshhorod Raion	Kyiv Oblast	18 June 2025	Old name did not match Ukrainian language standards
Chornukhyne Чорнухине	Chornushyne; Чорнушине	Rural settlement (Note: Controlled by the pro-Russian Luhansk People's Republic and Russia since 2014 following the Donbas war.)	Alchevsk Raion	Luhansk Oblast	18 June 2025	Old name did not match Ukrainian language standards
Komisarivka Комісарівка	Holubivka; Голубівка	Rural settlement	Alchevsk Raion	Luhansk Oblast	26 September 2024	Previously named after Commissars
Pervomaisk Первомайськ	Sokolohirsk; Сокологірськ	City	Alchevsk Raion	Luhansk Oblast	26 September 2024	Old name alluded to the First of May and did not match Ukrainian language standards
Utkyne Уткине	Utchyne; Утчине	Village	Alchevsk Raion	Luhansk Oblast	18 June 2025	Old name did not match Ukrainian language standards
Yurivka Юр'ївка	Yuriivka; Юріївка	Rural settlement	Alchevsk Raion	Luhansk Oblast	18 June 2025	Old name did not match Ukrainian language standards
Korobkyne Коробкине	Korobchyne; Коробчине	Village	Dovzhansk Raion	Luhansk Oblast	18 June 2025	Old name did not match Ukrainian language standards
Krasnodarskyi Краснодарський	Prykordonne; Прикордонне	Rural settlement	Dovzhansk Raion	Luhansk Oblast	26 September 2024	Previously named after the Russian city of Krasnodar
Utkyne Уткине	Utchyne; Утчине	Village	Dovzhansk Raion	Luhansk Oblast	18 June 2025	Old name did not match Ukrainian language standards
Cheliuskinets Челюскінець	Tytarenkove; Титаренкове	Rural settlement	Luhansk Raion	Luhansk Oblast	26 September 2024	Previously named after the crew members of SS Chelyuskin
Mala Yurivka Мала Юр'ївка	Mala Yuriivka; Мала Юріївка	Village	Luhansk Raion	Luhansk Oblast	18 June 2025	Old name did not match Ukrainian language standards
Molodohvardiisk Молодогвардійськ	Otamanivka; Отаманівка	City	Luhansk Raion	Luhansk Oblast	26 September 2024	Previously named after the Young Guard
Novosimeikine Новосімейкіне	Novosimeichyne; Новосімейчине	Rural settlement	Luhansk Raion	Luhansk Oblast	18 June 2025	Old name did not match Ukrainian language standards
Prydorozhne Придорожне	Prydorozhnie; Придорожнє	Village	Luhansk Raion	Luhansk Oblast	18 June 2025	Old name did not match Ukrainian language standards
Simeikyne Сімейкине	Simeichyne; Сімейчине	Rural settlement	Luhansk Raion	Luhansk Oblast	18 June 2025	Old name did not match Ukrainian language standards
Yesaulivka Єсаулівка	Osavulivka; Осавулівка	Village	Rovenky Raion	Luhansk Oblast	18 June 2025	Old name did not match Ukrainian language standards
Artema Артема	Liubomyrivka; Любомирівка	Village	Shchastia Raion	Luhansk Oblast	26 September 2024	Previously named after Fyodor Sergeyev (Artem)
Denezhnykove Денежникове	Petropavlivske; Петропавлівське	Village	Shchastia Raion	Luhansk Oblast	18 June 2025	Old name did not match Ukrainian language standards
Hrechyshkyne Гречишкине	Hrechyshchyne; Гречищине	Village	Shchastia Raion	Luhansk Oblast	18 June 2025	Old name did not match Ukrainian language standards
Lopaskyne Лопаскине	Lopashchyne; Лопащине	Village	Shchastia Raion	Luhansk Oblast	18 June 2025	Old name did not match Ukrainian language standards
Pobieda Побєда	Peremoha; Перемога	Rural settlement	Shchastia Raion	Luhansk Oblast	18 June 2025	Old name did not match Ukrainian language standards
Yuhanivka Юганівка	Bulavine; Булавіне	Village	Shchastia Raion	Luhansk Oblast	18 June 2025	Old name did not match Ukrainian language standards
Metolkine Метьолкіне	Metolchyne; Метьолчине	Village	Sievierodonetsk → Siverskodonetsk Raion	Luhansk Oblast	18 June 2025	Old name did not match Ukrainian language standards
Nova Astrakhan Нова Астрахань	Huziivka; Гузіївка	Village	Sievierodonetsk → Siverskodonetsk Raion	Luhansk Oblast	26 September 2024	Previously named after the Russian city of Astrakhan
Sievierodonetsk Сєвєеродонецьк	Siverskodonetsk; Сіверськодонецьк	City	Sievierodonetsk → Siverskodonetsk Raion	Luhansk Oblast	26 September 2024	Old name did not match Ukrainian language standards
Yepifanivka Єпіфанівка	Yepyfanivka; Єпифанівка	Village	Sievierodonetsk → Siverskodonetsk Raion	Luhansk Oblast	26 September 2024	Old name did not match Ukrainian language standards
Fartukivka Фартуківка	Fartukhivka; Фартухівка	Village	Starobilsk Raion	Luhansk Oblast	26 September 2024	Old name did not match Ukrainian language standards
Krasne Pole Красне Поле	Marynopil; Маринопіль	Village	Starobilsk Raion	Luhansk Oblast	26 September 2024	Old name alluded to the color red
Novoastrakhanske Новоастраханське	Novoslobidske; Новослобідське	Village	Starobilsk Raion	Luhansk Oblast	26 September 2024	Previously named after the Russian city of Astrakhan
Novopskov Новопсков	Aidar; Айдар	Rural settlement	Starobilsk Raion	Luhansk Oblast	26 September 2024	Previously named after the Russian city of Pskov
Novorozsosh Новорозсош	Plotyna; Плотина	Village	Starobilsk Raion	Luhansk Oblast	26 September 2024	Previously named after the Russian city of Rossosh
Pantiukhyne Пантюхине	Pantiushyne; Пантюшине	Village	Starobilsk Raion	Luhansk Oblast	26 September 2024	Old name did not match Ukrainian language standards
Pervomaisk Первомайськ	Popivka; Попівка	Village	Starobilsk Raion	Luhansk Oblast	26 September 2024	Old name alluded to the First of May and did not match Ukrainian language standards
Pervomaiske Первомайське	Stepkove; Степкове	Village	Starobilsk Raion	Luhansk Oblast	26 September 2024	Old name alluded to the First of May and did not match Ukrainian language standards
Polovynkyne Половинкине	Tolokivka; Толоківка	Village	Starobilsk Raion	Luhansk Oblast	26 September 2024	—
Teviasheve Тев'яшеве	Horikhove; Горіхове	Village	Starobilsk Raion	Luhansk Oblast	26 September 2024	Previously named after the Tevyashov noble family
Anoshkyne Аношкине	Starovirove; Старовірове	Village	Svatove Raion	Luhansk Oblast	26 September 2024	Previously named after a Russian Imperial general or soldier named Anokhin or Anokha
Nevske Невське	Balka Zhuravka; Балка Журавка	Village	Svatove Raion	Luhansk Oblast	26 September 2024	Previously named after the Nevsky Prospect or Alexander Nevsky
Nianchyne Нянчине	Nianchyne; Няньчине	Village	Svatove Raion	Luhansk Oblast	26 September 2024	Old name did not match Ukrainian language standards
Rodnychky Роднички	Krynychky; Кринички	Village	Svatove Raion	Luhansk Oblast	26 September 2024	Old name did not match Ukrainian language standards
Zhovtneve Жовтневе	Lemziakivka; Лемзяківка	Village	Svatove Raion	Luhansk Oblast	26 September 2024	Previously named after the October Revolution
Honchary Гончари	Honchari; Гончарі	Village	Lviv Raion	Lviv Oblast	26 September 2024	Old name did not match Ukrainian language standards
Krasichyn Красічин	Krasychyn; Красичин	Village	Lviv Raion	Lviv Oblast	26 September 2024	Old name did not match Ukrainian language standards
Nesterov Нестеров	Zhovkva; Жовква	City	Lviv Raion	Lviv Oblast	11 October 1991	Previously named after Pyotr Nesterov
Chervonohrad Червоноград	Sheptytskyi; Шептицький	City	Chervonohrad → Sheptytskyi Raion	Lviv Oblast	26 September 2024	Old name alluded to the color red
Lystvianyi Листв'яний	Lystvianyi; Листвяний	Village	Stryi Raion	Lviv Oblast	26 September 2024	Old name did not match Ukrainian language standards
Iordanivka Іорданівка	Yordanivka; Йорданівка	Village	Yavoriv Raion	Lviv Oblast	26 September 2024	Old name did not match Ukrainian language standards
Chervone Червоне	Halytske; Галицьке	Village	Zolochiv Raion	Lviv Oblast	26 September 2024	Old name alluded to the color red
Chishky Чішки	Chyshky; Чишки	Village	Zolochiv Raion	Lviv Oblast	26 September 2024	Old name did not match Ukrainian language standards
Kizia Кіз'я	Kizia; Кізя	Village	Zolochiv Raion	Lviv Oblast	26 September 2024	Old name did not match Ukrainian language standards
Pidhorodne Підгородне	Pidhorodnie; Підгороднє	Village	Zolochiv Raion	Lviv Oblast	26 September 2024	Old name did not match Ukrainian language standards
Chervonopillia Червонопілля	Krasnopillia; Краснопілля	Village	Bashtanka Raion	Mykolaiv Oblast	26 September 2024	Old name alluded to the color red
Chervonyi Stav Червоний Став	Sukhyi Stav; Сухий Став	Village	Bashtanka Raion	Mykolaiv Oblast	26 September 2024	Old name alluded to the color red
Chervonyi Stav Червоний Став	Tykhyi Stav; Тихий Став	Village	Bashtanka Raion	Mykolaiv Oblast	26 September 2024	Old name alluded to the color red
Chervonyi Yar Червоний Яр	Ternovyi Yar; Терновий Яр	Village	Bashtanka Raion	Mykolaiv Oblast	26 September 2024	Old name alluded to the color red
Novorosiiske Новоросійське	Kozatske; Козацьке	Village	Bashtanka Raion	Mykolaiv Oblast	26 September 2024	Previously named after Novorossiya
Pershotravneve Першотравневе	Myrne; Мирне	Village	Bashtanka Raion	Mykolaiv Oblast	26 September 2024	Old name alluded to the First of May
Rodnyky Родники	Zatyshne; Затишне	Village	Bashtanka Raion	Mykolaiv Oblast	18 June 2025	Old name did not match Ukrainian language standards
Volna Волна	Khvylia; Хвиля	Village	Bashtanka Raion	Mykolaiv Oblast	18 June 2025	Old name did not match Ukrainian language standards
Yurivka Юр'ївка	Yuriivka; Юріївка	Village	Bashtanka Raion	Mykolaiv Oblast	26 September 2024	Old name did not match Ukrainian language standards
Hreihove Грейгове	Myroliubove; Миролюбове	Rural settlement	Mykolaiv Raion	Mykolaiv Oblast	26 September 2024	Previously named after Aleksey Greig
Hurivka Гур'ївка	Huriivka; Гуріївка	Village	Mykolaiv Raion	Mykolaiv Oblast	18 June 2025	Old name did not match Ukrainian language standards
Luch Луч	Promin; Промінь	Rural settlement	Mykolaiv Raion	Mykolaiv Oblast	18 June 2025	Old name did not match Ukrainian language standards
Novoiurivka Новоюр'ївка	Novoiuriivka; Новоюріївка	Village	Mykolaiv Raion	Mykolaiv Oblast	18 June 2025	Old name did not match Ukrainian language standards
Pervomaiske Первомайське	Zavodske; Заводське	Rural settlement	Mykolaiv Raion	Mykolaiv Oblast	18 June 2025	Old name alluded to the First of May and did not match Ukrainian language standards
Suvorovka Суворовка	Dykyi Khutir; Дикий Хутір	Village	Mykolaiv Raion	Mykolaiv Oblast	26 September 2024	Previously named after Alexander Suvorov
Hrazhdanivka Гражданівка	Levytske; Левицьке	Village	Pervomaisk Raion	Mykolaiv Oblast	26 September 2024	Old name did not match Ukrainian language standards
Krasnivka Краснівка	Luchkivka; Лучківка	Village	Pervomaisk Raion	Mykolaiv Oblast	26 September 2024	Old name alluded to the color red
Krasnopil Краснопіль	Chaikivka; Чайківка	Village	Pervomaisk Raion	Mykolaiv Oblast	26 September 2024	Old name alluded to the color red
Michurine Мічуріне	Symyrenky; Симиренки	Village	Pervomaisk Raion	Mykolaiv Oblast	26 September 2024	Previously named after Ivan Michurin
Syniukhyn Brid Синюхин Брід	Syniushyn Brid; Синюшин Брід	Village	Pervomaisk Raion	Mykolaiv Oblast	18 June 2025	Old name did not match Ukrainian language standards
Yurivka Юр'ївка	Yuriivka; Юріївка	Village	Pervomaisk Raion	Mykolaiv Oblast	26 September 2024	Old name did not match Ukrainian language standards
Nadezhdivka Надеждівка	Nadiia; Надія	Village	Voznesensk Raion	Mykolaiv Oblast	18 June 2025	Old name did not match Ukrainian language standards
Timiriazievka Тімірязєвка	Myroliubivske; Миролюбівське	Rural settlement	Voznesensk Raion	Mykolaiv Oblast	18 June 2025	Previously named after Kliment Timiryazev
Pershotravnivka Першотравнівка	Kvitkove; Квіткове	Village	Voznesensk Raion	Mykolaiv Oblast	26 September 2024	Old name alluded to the First of May
Pryiut Приют	Malovnyche; Мальовниче	Village	Voznesensk Raion	Mykolaiv Oblast	26 September 2024	Old name did not match Ukrainian language standards
Tsaredarivka Царедарівка	Velykozabolotne; Великозаболотне	Village	Voznesensk Raion	Mykolaiv Oblast	26 September 2024	Previously named after the Russian Tsar
Uralske Уральське	Slavne; Славне	Village	Voznesensk Raion	Mykolaiv Oblast	26 September 2024	Previously named after the Ural Mountains
Yurivka Юр'ївка	Yuriivka; Юріївка	Village	Voznesensk Raion	Mykolaiv Oblast	18 June 2025	Old name did not match Ukrainian language standards
Yuzhnoukrainsk Южноукраїнськ	Pivdennoukrainsk; Південноукраїнськ	City	Voznesensk Raion	Mykolaiv Oblast	9 October 2024	Old name did not match Ukrainian language standards
Andriievo-Ivanivka Андрієво-Іванівка	Chernove; Чернове	Village	Berezivka Raion	Odesa Oblast	26 September 2024	Previously named after Andrei Ivanov
Petrivka Петрівка	Buialyk; Буялик	Rural settlement	Berezivka Raion	Odesa Oblast	26 September 2024	Previously named after Grigory Petrovsky
Polino-Osypenkove Поліно-Осипенкове	Brashevanivka; Брашеванівка	Village	Berezivka Raion	Odesa Oblast	18 June 2025	Previously named after Polina Osipenko
Sukhyi Ovrah Сухий Овраг	Sukhyi Yar; Сухий Яр	Village	Berezivka Raion	Odesa Oblast	26 September 2024	Old name did not match Ukrainian language standards
Mykolaivka-Novorosiiska Миколаївка-Новоросійська	Bairamcha; Байрамча	Village	Bilhorod-Dnistrovskyi Raion	Odesa Oblast	26 September 2024	Previously named after Novorossiya; renamed under the Soviet Union in an attempt to erase Tatar heritage
Nadezhda Надежда	Nadiia; Надія	Village	Bilhorod-Dnistrovskyi Raion	Odesa Oblast	18 June 2025	Old name did not match Ukrainian language standards
Zoria Зоря	Kamchyk; Камчик	Village	Bilhorod-Dnistrovskyi Raion	Odesa Oblast	26 September 2024	Previously named after the red star; renamed under the Soviet Union in an attempt to erase Bulgarian heritage
Berezyne Березине	Soborne; Соборне	Rural settlement	Bolhrad Raion	Odesa Oblast	26 September 2024	Previously named after the Berezina River, the site of the Battle of Berezina
Borodino Бородіно	Budzhak; Буджак	Rural settlement	Bolhrad Raion	Odesa Oblast	26 September 2024	Previously named after the Russian village of Borodino, the site of the Battle of Borodino
Kholmske Холмське	Seliohlo; Селіогло	Village	Bolhrad Raion	Odesa Oblast	15 June 2025	Renamed under the Soviet Union in an attempt to erase Bulgarian heritage
Maloiaroslavets Druhyi Малоярославець Другий	Yaroslavove; Ярославове	Village	Bolhrad Raion	Odesa Oblast	26 September 2024	Previously named after the Russian village of Maloyaroslavets, the site of the Battle of Maloyaroslavets
Maloiaroslavets Pershyi Малоярославець Перший	Prykordonne; Прикордонне	Village	Bolhrad Raion	Odesa Oblast	26 September 2024	Previously named after the Russian village of Maloyaroslavets, the site of the Battle of Maloyaroslavets
Nadezhdivka Надеждівка	Nadiia; Надія	Village	Bolhrad Raion	Odesa Oblast	18 June 2025	Old name did not match Ukrainian language standards
Nove Tarutyne Нове Тарутине	Novodolynske; Новодолинське	Village	Bolhrad Raion	Odesa Oblast	26 September 2024	Previously named after the Russian village of Tarutino, the site of the Battle of Tarutino
Novokholmske Новохолмське	Aliiaha; Аліяга	Rural settlement	Bolhrad Raion	Odesa Oblast	15 June 2025	Renamed under the Soviet Union in an attempt to erase Bulgarian heritage
Roshcha Роща	Novyi Paryzh; Новий Париж	Village	Bolhrad Raion	Odesa Oblast	26 September 2024	Old name did not match Ukrainian language standards
Tarutyne Тарутине	Bessarabske; Бессарабське	Rural settlement	Bolhrad Raion	Odesa Oblast	26 September 2024	Previously named after the Russian village of Tarutino, the site of the Battle of Tarutino
Yurivka Юр'ївка	Yuriivka; Юріївка	Village	Bolhrad Raion	Odesa Oblast	18 June 2025	Old name did not match Ukrainian language standards
Pershotravneve Першотравневе	Vyshneve; Вишневе	Village	Izmail Raion	Odesa Oblast	26 September 2024	Old name alluded to the First of May
Suvorove Суворове	Katlabuh; Катлабуг	Rural settlement	Izmail Raion	Odesa Oblast	26 September 2024	Previously named after Alexander Suvorov
Hvardiiske Гвардійське	Zmiienkove; Змієнкове	Village	Odesa Raion	Odesa Oblast	26 September 2024	Previously named after the Soviet Guards
Pershotravneve Першотравневе	Prychornomorske; Причорноморське	Village	Odesa Raion	Odesa Oblast	26 September 2024	Old name alluded to the First of May
Yuzhne Южне	Pivdenne; Південне	City	Odesa Raion	Odesa Oblast	9 October 2024	Old name did not match Ukrainian language standards
Tkachenka Ткаченка	Orlivske; Орлівське	Village	Podilsk Raion	Odesa Oblast	26 September 2024	Previously named after the Bolshevik P. Tkachenko
Yanovka Яновка	Yanivka; Янівка	Village	Podilsk Raion	Odesa Oblast	18 June 2025	Old name did not match Ukrainian language standards
Andriievo-Ivanove Анрієво-Іванове	Svitanok; Світанок	Village	Rozdilna Raion	Odesa Oblast	26 September 2024	Previously named after Andrei Ivanov
Miliardivka Міліардівка	Miliardivka; Мільярдівка	Village	Rozdilna Raion	Odesa Oblast	26 September 2024	Old name did not match Ukrainian language standards
Olhynove Ольгинове	Olzhynove; Ольжинове	Village	Rozdilna Raion	Odesa Oblast	18 June 2025	Old name did not match Ukrainian language standards
Pershe Travnia Перше Травня	Moldovanka; Молдованка	Village	Rozdilna Raion	Odesa Oblast	26 September 2024	Old name alluded to the First of May
Pershe Travnia Перше Травня	Shchaslyve; Щасливе	Village	Rozdilna Raion	Odesa Oblast	26 September 2024	Old name alluded to the First of May
Pershotravneve Першотравневе	Hurivske; Гурівське	Village	Rozdilna Raion	Odesa Oblast	26 September 2024	Old name alluded to the First of May
Pervomaiske Первомайське	Bolharka; Болгарка	Village	Rozdilna Raion	Odesa Oblast	26 September 2024	Old name alluded to the First of May and did not match Ukrainian language standards
Polezne Полезне	Male Hrosulove; Мале Гросулове	Village	Rozdilna Raion	Odesa Oblast	18 June 2025	Old name did not match Ukrainian language standards
Rosiianivka Росіянівка	Kozatske; Козацьке	Village	Rozdilna Raion	Odesa Oblast	26 September 2024	Previously named after Russia
Starostyne Старостине	Starosillia; Старосілля	Village	Rozdilna Raion	Odesa Oblast	26 September 2024	Previously named after the Bolshevik Pyotr Starostin
Novomoskovske Новомосковське	Loza; Лоза	Village	Kremenchuk Raion	Poltava Oblast	26 September 2024	Previously named after Moscow
Chervone Червоне	Pasichne; Пасічне	Village	Lubny Raion	Poltava Oblast	18 June 2025	Old name alluded to the color red
Chervoni Polohy Червоні Пологи	Polohy; Пологи	Village	Lubny Raion	Poltava Oblast	26 September 2024	Old name alluded to the color red
Oleksiivka Олексіївка	Kalynivka; Калинівка	Village	Lubny Raion	Poltava Oblast	26 September 2024	Previously named after the Russian Imperial statesman Aleksey Teplov
Pershotravneve Першотравневе	Perevidne; Перевідне	Village	Lubny Raion	Poltava Oblast	26 September 2024	Old name alluded to the First of May
Chervona Balka Червона Балка	Balka; Балка	Village	Myrhorod Raion	Poltava Oblast	18 June 2025	Old name alluded to the color red
Chervona Slobidka Червона Слобідка	Slobidske; Слобідське	Village	Myrhorod Raion	Poltava Oblast	18 June 2025	Old name alluded to the color red
Dekabrystiv Декабристів	Myrne; Мирне	Rural settlement	Myrhorod Raion	Poltava Oblast	26 September 2024	Previously named after the Decembrist revolt
Pershotravneve Першотравневе	Petrenky; Петренки	Village	Myrhorod Raion	Poltava Oblast	26 September 2024	Old name alluded to the First of May
Radchenkove Радченкове	Dvirets; Двірець	Village	Myrhorod Raion	Poltava Oblast	18 June 2025	Previously named after the Bolshevik Hryhorii Radchenko
Yurivka Юр'ївка	Yuriivka; Юріївка	Village	Myrhorod Raion	Poltava Oblast	18 June 2025	Old name did not match Ukrainian language standards
Zirka Зірка	Zoriane; Зоряне	Village	Myrhorod Raion	Poltava Oblast	18 June 2025	Previously named after the red star
Chervona Dolyna Червона Долина	Dolynne; Долинне	Village	Poltava Raion	Poltava Oblast	26 September 2024	Old name alluded to the color red
Chkalove Чкалове	Yednannia; Єднання	Village	Poltava Raion	Poltava Oblast	26 September 2024	Previously named after Valery Chkalov
Kunivka Кунівка	Ridne; Рідне	Village	Poltava Raion	Poltava Oblast	18 June 2025	Previously named after the Russian Imperial landowner Kuna
Levanevske Леваневське	Tatarshchyna; Татарщина	Village	Poltava Raion	Poltava Oblast	18 June 2025	Previously named after Sigizmund Levanevsky
Nadezhda Надежда	Nadiia; Надія	Village	Poltava Raion	Poltava Oblast	18 June 2025	Old name did not match Ukrainian language standards
Pershotravneve Першотравневе	Maidan; Майдан	Village	Poltava Raion	Poltava Oblast	26 September 2024	Old name alluded to the First of May
Pershotravneve Першотравневе	Prylivshchyna; Прилівщина	Village	Poltava Raion	Poltava Oblast	26 September 2024	Old name alluded to the First of May
Pervomaiske Первомайське	Huliaistep; Гуляйстеп	Village	Poltava Raion	Poltava Oblast	26 September 2024	Old name alluded to the First of May and did not match Ukrainian language standards
Riaske Ряське	Riaska; Ряська	Village	Poltava Raion	Poltava Oblast	18 June 2025	—
Sukhynivka Сухинівка	Polissia; Полісся	Village	Poltava Raion	Poltava Oblast	18 June 2025	Previously named after the Russian Imperial official and landowner Nikolai Sukhin
Miatyn Мятин	Miatyn; М'ятин	Village	Dubno Raion	Rivne Oblast	26 September 2024	Old name did not match Ukrainian language standards
Moskovshchyna Московщина	Shchaslyve; Щасливе	Village	Dubno Raion	Rivne Oblast	26 September 2024	Previously named after Moscow
Prydorozhne Придорожне	Prydorozhnie; Придорожнє	Village	Dubno Raion	Rivne Oblast	26 September 2024	Old name did not match Ukrainian language standards
Buniakyne Бунякине	Buniachyne; Бунячине	Village	Konotop Raion	Sumy Oblast	18 June 2025	Old name did not match Ukrainian language standards
Hrechkyne Гречкине	Hrechky; Гречки	Village	Konotop Raion	Sumy Oblast	18 June 2025	Old name did not match Ukrainian language standards
Hrybaniove Гречкине	Hrybaniv; Грибанів	Village	Konotop Raion	Sumy Oblast	18 June 2025	Old name did not match Ukrainian language standards
Lebedieve Лебедєве	Lebedi; Лебеді	Village	Konotop Raion	Sumy Oblast	18 June 2025	Old name did not match Ukrainian language standards
Papkyne Папкине	Papachyne; Папчине	Village	Konotop Raion	Sumy Oblast	18 June 2025	Old name did not match Ukrainian language standards
Pershotravneve Першотравневе	Dibrova; Діброва	Village	Konotop Raion	Sumy Oblast	26 September 2024	Old name alluded to the First of May
Pytomnyk Питомник	Sadove; Садове	Rural settlement	Konotop Raion	Sumy Oblast	26 September 2024	Old name did not match Ukrainian language standards
Simeikyne Сімейкине	Simeichyne; Сімейчине	Village	Konotop Raion	Sumy Oblast	18 June 2025	Old name did not match Ukrainian language standards
Yurieve Юр'єве	Yuriieve; Юрієве	Village	Konotop Raion	Sumy Oblast	26 September 2024	Old name did not match Ukrainian language standards
Zhabkyne Жабкине	Zhabchyne; Жабчине	Village	Konotop Raion	Sumy Oblast	18 June 2025	Old name did not match Ukrainian language standards
Novopostroiene Новопостроєне	Novozbudovane; Новозбудоване	Village	Okhtyrka Raion	Sumy Oblast	18 June 2025	Old name did not match Ukrainian language standards
Piatkyne П'яткине	Piatchyne; П'ятчине	Village	Okhtyrka Raion	Sumy Oblast	18 June 2025	Old name did not match Ukrainian language standards
Pershotravneve Першотравневе	Boromelske; Боромельське	Village	Okhtyrka Raion	Sumy Oblast	26 September 2024	Old name alluded to the First of May
Chervona Dolyna Червона Долина	Dolynske; Долинське	Village	Romny Raion	Sumy Oblast	26 September 2024	Old name alluded to the color red
Chervonohirka Червоногірка	Masoniv; Масонів	Village	Romny Raion	Sumy Oblast	26 September 2024	Old name alluded to the color red
Horkove Горькове	Horkove; Горкове	Village	Romny Raion	Sumy Oblast	18 June 2025	Old name did not match Ukrainian language standards
Lukashove Лукашове	Lukasheve; Лукашеве	Village	Romny Raion	Sumy Oblast	26 September 2024	Old name did not match Ukrainian language standards
Moskovske Московське	Myrne; Мирне	Village	Romny Raion	Sumy Oblast	26 September 2024	Previously named after Moscow
Vasylivka Василівка	Zarudne; Зарудне	Village	Romny Raion	Sumy Oblast	26 September 2024	Previously named after the Bolshevik Vasyl Yaremenko
Zhytne Житне	Zhytnie; Житнє	Village	Romny Raion	Sumy Oblast	26 September 2024	Old name did not match Ukrainian language standards
Druzhba Дружба	Khutir-Mykhailivskyi; Хутір-Михайлівський	City	Shostka Raion	Sumy Oblast	26 September 2024	Previously named after the Friendship of peoples
Maiske Майське	Zelene; Зелене	Village	Shostka Raion	Sumy Oblast	26 September 2024	Old name alluded to the First of May
Marchykhyna Buda Марчихина Буда	Marchyshyna Buda; Марчишина Буда	Village	Shostka Raion	Sumy Oblast	18 June 2025	Old name did not match Ukrainian language standards
Moskovske Московське	Kyivske; Київське	Village	Shostka Raion	Sumy Oblast	29 June 2023	Previously named after Moscow
Olhyne Ольгине	Olzhyne; Ольжине	Village	Shostka Raion	Sumy Oblast	26 September 2024	Old name did not match Ukrainian language standards
Pershe Travnia Перше Травня	Yaniv Khutir; Янів Хутір	Village	Shostka Raion	Sumy Oblast	26 September 2024	Old name alluded to the First of May
Pervomaiske Первомайське	Yanivka; Янівка	Village	Shostka Raion	Sumy Oblast	26 September 2024	Old name alluded to the First of May and did not match Ukrainian language standards
Sorokyne Сорокине	Sorochyne; Сорочине	Village	Shostka Raion	Sumy Oblast	18 June 2025	Old name did not match Ukrainian language standards
Yemadykyne Ємадикине	Yemadychyne; Ємадичине	Village	Shostka Raion	Sumy Oblast	18 June 2025	Old name did not match Ukrainian language standards
Moskalivshchyna Москалівщина	Zhuravlyne; Журавлине	Village	Sumy Raion	Sumy Oblast	26 September 2024	Previously named after Moscow
Moskovskyi Bobryk Московський Бобрик	Lebedynyi Bobryk; Лебединий Бобрик	Village	Sumy Raion	Sumy Oblast	26 September 2024	Previously named after Moscow
Pashkyne Пашкине	Pashchyne; Пащине	Village	Sumy Raion	Sumy Oblast	18 June 2025	Old name did not match Ukrainian language standards
Pershe Travnia Перше Травня	Khutir; Хутір	Village	Sumy Raion	Sumy Oblast	26 September 2024	Old name alluded to the First of May
Pershe Travnia Перше Травня	Novokostiantynivka; Новокостянтинівка	Village	Sumy Raion	Sumy Oblast	26 September 2024	Old name alluded to the First of May
Pershotravneve Першотравневе	Andriivske; Андріївське	Rural settlement	Sumy Raion	Sumy Oblast	26 September 2024	Old name alluded to the First of May
Pershotravneve Першотравневе	Klenove; Кленове	Village	Sumy Raion	Sumy Oblast	26 September 2024	Old name alluded to the First of May
Timiriazievka Тімірязєвка	Slobozhanske; Слобожанське	Rural settlement	Sumy Raion	Sumy Oblast	18 June 2025	Previously named after Kliment Timiryazev
Zelena Roshcha Зелена Роща	Zelena Dibrova; Зелена Діброва	Village	Sumy Raion	Sumy Oblast	26 September 2024	Old name did not match Ukrainian language standards
Hvardiiske Гвардійське	Hnylovody; Гниловоди	Village	Ternopil Raion	Ternopil Oblast	26 September 2024	Previously named after the Soviet Guards
Pidhorodne Підгородне	Pidhorodnie; Підгороднє	Village	Ternopil Raion	Ternopil Oblast	26 September 2024	Old name did not match Ukrainian language standards
Leninka Ленінка	Pryvitne; Привітне	Rural settlement	Haisyn Raion	Vinnytsia Oblast	29 June 2023	Previously named after Vladimir Lenin
Pervomaiske Первомайське	Hadai; Гадаї	Rural settlement	Haisyn Raion	Vinnytsia Oblast	29 June 2023	Old name alluded to the First of May and did not match Ukrainian language standards
Olhyne Ольгине	Olzhyne; Ольжине	Village	Khmilnyk Raion	Vinnytsia Oblast	26 September 2024	Old name did not match Ukrainian language standards
Pervomaiske Первомайське	Postolove; Постолове	Rural settlement	Khmilnyk Raion	Vinnytsia Oblast	26 September 2024	Old name alluded to the First of May and did not match Ukrainian language standards
Dzyhivka Дзигівка	Dzygivka; Дзиґівка	Village	Mohyliv-Podilskyi Raion	Vinnytsia Oblast	26 September 2024	Old name did not match Ukrainian language standards
Krasne Красне	Shchaslyve; Щасливе	Village	Tulchyn Raion	Vinnytsia Oblast	26 September 2024	Old name alluded to the color red
Pestelia Пестеля	Kiltiava; Кільтява	Rural settlement	Tulchyn Raion	Vinnytsia Oblast	26 September 2024	Previously named after Pavel Pestel
Suvorovske Суворовське	Podilske; Подільське	Village	Tulchyn Raion	Vinnytsia Oblast	26 September 2024	Previously named after Alexander Suvorov
Dorozhne Дорожне	Dorozhnie; Дорожнє	Village	Vinnytsia Raion	Vinnytsia Oblast	26 September 2024	Old name did not match Ukrainian language standards
Nekrasove Некрасове	Yuzvyn; Юзвин	Village	Vinnytsia Raion	Vinnytsia Oblast	26 September 2024	Previously named after Nikolay Nekrasov
Pidhorodne Підгородне	Pidhorodnie; Підгороднє	Village	Kovel Raion	Volyn Oblast	26 September 2024	Old name did not match Ukrainian language standards
Rohovi Smoliary Рогові Смоляри	Rohovi Smoliari; Рогові Смолярі	Village	Kovel Raion	Volyn Oblast	26 September 2024	Old name did not match Ukrainian language standards
Smoliary-Svitiazki Смоляри-Світязькі	Smoliari-Svitiazki; Смолярі-Світязькі	Village	Kovel Raion	Volyn Oblast	26 September 2024	Old name did not match Ukrainian language standards
Stolynski Smoliary Столинські Смоляри	Stolynski Smoliari; Столинські Смолярі	Village	Kovel Raion	Volyn Oblast	26 September 2024	Old name did not match Ukrainian language standards
Parkhomenkove Пархоменкове	Vydranka; Видранка	Village	Volodymyr-Volynskyi → Volodymyr Raion	Volyn Oblast	18 June 2025	Previously named after Alexander Parkhomenko
Petrove Петрове	Tsutsniv; Цуцнів	Village	Volodymyr-Volynskyi → Volodymyr Raion	Volyn Oblast	15 June 2025	Previously named after the Soviet deputy political instructor of border troops Vasyl Petrov
Volodymyr-Volynskyi Володимир-Волинський	Volodymyr; Володимир	City	Volodymyr-Volynskyi → Volodymyr Raion	Volyn Oblast	15 December 2021	Old name was given to avoid confusion with the city of Vladimir in the Russian language
Bobove Бобове	Tysobyken; Тисобикень	Village	Berehove Raion	Zakarpattia Oblast	19 October 2000	Renamed under the Soviet Union in an attempt to erase Hungarian heritage
Bratovo Братово	Botar; Ботар	Village	Berehove Raion	Zakarpattia Oblast	19 October 2000	Renamed under the Soviet Union in an attempt to erase Hungarian heritage
Chetove Четове	Chetfalva; Четфалва	Village	Berehove Raion	Zakarpattia Oblast	2 March 1995	Renamed under the Soviet Union in an attempt to erase Hungarian heritage
Derenkovets Деренковець	Shom; Шом	Village	Berehove Raion	Zakarpattia Oblast	2 March 1995	Renamed under the Soviet Union in an attempt to erase Hungarian heritage
Diakovo Дяково	Nevetlenfolu; Неветленфолу	Village	Berehove Raion	Zakarpattia Oblast	19 October 2000	Renamed under the Soviet Union in an attempt to erase Hungarian heritage
Didove Дідове	Dyida; Дийда	Village	Berehove Raion	Zakarpattia Oblast	2 March 1995	Renamed under the Soviet Union in an attempt to erase Hungarian heritage
Divychne Дівичне	Forholan; Форголань	Village	Berehove Raion	Zakarpattia Oblast	19 October 2000	Renamed under the Soviet Union in an attempt to erase Hungarian heritage
Dobrosillia Добросілля	Bene; Бене	Village	Berehove Raion	Zakarpattia Oblast	2 March 1995	Renamed under the Soviet Union in an attempt to erase Hungarian heritage
Dzvinkove Дзвінкове	Horonhlab; Горонглаб	Village	Berehove Raion	Zakarpattia Oblast	2 March 1995	Renamed under the Soviet Union in an attempt to erase Hungarian heritage
Harazdivka Гараздівка	Hut; Гут	Village	Berehove Raion	Zakarpattia Oblast	2 March 1995	Renamed under the Soviet Union in an attempt to erase Hungarian heritage
Hrabariv Грабарів	Halabor; Галабор	Village	Berehove Raion	Zakarpattia Oblast	21 September 1991	Renamed under the Soviet Union in an attempt to erase Hungarian heritage
Ivanivka Іванівка	Yanoshi; Яноші	Village	Berehove Raion	Zakarpattia Oblast	2 March 1995	Renamed under the Soviet Union in an attempt to erase Hungarian heritage
Klynove Клинове	Okli; Оклі	Village	Berehove Raion	Zakarpattia Oblast	19 October 2000	Renamed under the Soviet Union in an attempt to erase Hungarian heritage
Klynovetska Hora Клиновецька Гора	Okli Hed; Оклі Гедь	Village	Berehove Raion	Zakarpattia Oblast	19 October 2000	Renamed under the Soviet Union in an attempt to erase Hungarian heritage
Kosyny Косини	Koson; Косонь	Village	Berehove Raion	Zakarpattia Oblast	2 March 1995	Renamed under the Soviet Union in an attempt to erase Hungarian heritage
Luzhanka Лужанка	Astei; Астей	Village	Berehove Raion	Zakarpattia Oblast	21 September 1991	Renamed under the Soviet Union in an attempt to erase Hungarian heritage
Lypove Липове	Heten; Гетен	Village	Berehove Raion	Zakarpattia Oblast	2 March 1995	Renamed under the Soviet Union in an attempt to erase Hungarian heritage
Nove Selo Нове Село	Berehuifalu; Берегуйфалу	Village	Berehove Raion	Zakarpattia Oblast	21 September 1991	Renamed under the Soviet Union in an attempt to erase Hungarian heritage
Petrovo Петрово	Pyiterfolvo; Пийтерфолво	Village	Berehove Raion	Zakarpattia Oblast	19 October 2000	Renamed under the Soviet Union in an attempt to erase Hungarian heritage
Pushkino Пушкіно	Mizhlisne; Міжлісне	Village	Berehove Raion	Zakarpattia Oblast	26 September 2024	Previously named after Alexander Pushkin
Yulivtsi Юлівці	Diula; Дюла	Village	Berehove Raion	Zakarpattia Oblast	2 March 1995	Renamed under the Soviet Union in an attempt to erase Hungarian heritage
Zabolottia Заболоття	Fertesholmash; Фертешолмаш	Village	Berehove Raion	Zakarpattia Oblast	19 October 2000	Renamed under the Soviet Union in an attempt to erase Hungarian heritage
Zastavne Заставне	Zapson; Запсонь	Village	Berehove Raion	Zakarpattia Oblast	21 September 1991	Renamed under the Soviet Union in an attempt to erase Hungarian heritage
Zmiivka Зміївка	Kidosh; Кідьош	Village	Berehove Raion	Zakarpattia Oblast	21 September 1991	Renamed under the Soviet Union in an attempt to erase Hungarian heritage
Drysina Дрисіна	Dertsen; Дерцен	Village	Mukachevo Raion	Zakarpattia Oblast	2 March 1995	Renamed under the Soviet Union in an attempt to erase Hungarian heritage
Liskove Ліскове	Fornosh; Форнош	Village	Mukachevo Raion	Zakarpattia Oblast	2 March 1995	Renamed under the Soviet Union in an attempt to erase Hungarian heritage
Nove Selo Нове Село	Shenborn; Шенборн	Village	Mukachevo Raion	Zakarpattia Oblast	2 March 1995	Renamed under the Soviet Union in an attempt to erase German heritage
Rivne Рівне	Serne; Серне	Village	Mukachevo Raion	Zakarpattia Oblast	2 March 1995	Renamed under the Soviet Union in an attempt to erase Hungarian heritage
Lopukhiv Лопухів	Brustury; Брустури	Village	Tiachiv Raion	Zakarpattia Oblast	29 June 2023	Renamed under the Soviet Union in an attempt to erase Romanian heritage
Peshchera Пещера	Pechera; Печера	Village	Tiachiv Raion	Zakarpattia Oblast	26 September 2024	Old name did not match Ukrainian language standards
Chertezh Чертеж	Chertizh; Чертіж	Village	Uzhhorod Raion	Zakarpattia Oblast	26 September 2024	Old name did not match Ukrainian language standards
Derevtsi Деревці	Batfa; Батфа	Village	Uzhhorod Raion	Zakarpattia Oblast	2 March 1995	Renamed under the Soviet Union in an attempt to erase Hungarian heritage
Komarivtsi Комарівці	Palad-Komarivtsi; Паладь-Комарівці	Village	Uzhhorod Raion	Zakarpattia Oblast	2 March 1995	Renamed under the Soviet Union in an attempt to erase Hungarian heritage
Kybliary Кибляри	Kybliari; Киблярі	Village	Uzhhorod Raion	Zakarpattia Oblast	26 September 2024	Old name did not match Ukrainian language standards
Pavlove Павлове	Pallo; Палло	Village	Uzhhorod Raion	Zakarpattia Oblast	2 March 1995	Renamed under the Soviet Union in an attempt to erase Hungarian heritage
Prykordonne Прикордонне	Botfalva; Ботфалва	Village	Uzhhorod Raion	Zakarpattia Oblast	2 March 1995	Renamed under the Soviet Union in an attempt to erase Hungarian heritage
Strumkivka Струмківка	Siurte; Сюрте	Village	Uzhhorod Raion	Zakarpattia Oblast	2 March 1995	Renamed under the Soviet Union in an attempt to erase Hungarian heritage
Tsehlivka Цеглівка	Tyihlash; Тийглаш	Village	Uzhhorod Raion	Zakarpattia Oblast	2 March 1995	Renamed under the Soviet Union in an attempt to erase Hungarian heritage
Tysianka Тисянка	Tysaahtelek; Тисаагтелек	Village	Uzhhorod Raion	Zakarpattia Oblast	2 March 1995	Renamed under the Soviet Union in an attempt to erase Hungarian heritage
Podsporie Подспор'є	Nohai; Ногаї	Rural settlement	Berdiansk Raion	Zaporizhzhia Oblast	18 June 2025	Old name did not match Ukrainian language standards
Viacheslavka Вячеславка	Viacheslavka; В'ячеславка	Village	Berdiansk Raion	Zaporizhzhia Oblast	18 June 2025	Old name did not match Ukrainian language standards
Chkalove Чкалове	Havrylivka; Гаврилівка	Village	Melitopol Raion	Zaporizhzhia Oblast	26 September 2024	Previously named after Valery Chkalov
Chkalove Чкалове	Sviatotroitske; Святотроїцьке	Village	Melitopol Raion	Zaporizhzhia Oblast	26 September 2024	Previously named after Valery Chkalov
Dobrovolcheske Добровольчеське	Dobrovolche; Добровольче	Rural settlement	Melitopol Raion	Zaporizhzhia Oblast	18 June 2025	Old name did not match Ukrainian language standards
Hvardiiske Гвардійське	Dvanadtsiate; Дванадцяте	Village	Melitopol Raion	Zaporizhzhia Oblast	26 September 2024	Previously named after the Soviet Guards
Kyrpychne Кирпичне	Huttertal; Гуттерталь	Village	Melitopol Raion	Zaporizhzhia Oblast	18 June 2025	Old name did not match Ukrainian language standards; renamed under the Soviet Union in an attempt to erase German heritage
Maksyma Horkoho Максима Горького	Koshove; Кошове	Rural settlement	Melitopol Raion	Zaporizhzhia Oblast	26 September 2024	Previously named after Maxim Gorky
Mordvynivka Мордвинівка	Molochne; Молочне	Village	Melitopol Raion	Zaporizhzhia Oblast	26 September 2024	Previously named after the Mordvins
Nadezhdyne Надеждине	Kararuha; Караруга	Village	Melitopol Raion	Zaporizhzhia Oblast	18 June 2025	Old name did not match Ukrainian language standards
Novhorodkivka Новгородківка	Chekhohrad; Чехоград	Village	Melitopol Raion	Zaporizhzhia Oblast	29 June 2023	Renamed under the Soviet Union in an attempt to erase Czech heritage
Obilne Обільне	Aviatsiine; Авіаційне	Village	Melitopol Raion	Zaporizhzhia Oblast	18 June 2025	Old name did not match Ukrainian language standards
Peremozhne Переможне	Sichove; Січове	Rural settlement	Melitopol Raion	Zaporizhzhia Oblast	26 September 2024	—
Pershotravneve Першотравневе	Kalnyshevske; Калнишевське	Village	Melitopol Raion	Zaporizhzhia Oblast	26 September 2024	Old name alluded to the First of May
Plodorodne Плодородне	Raikhenfeld; Райхенфельд	Village	Melitopol Raion	Zaporizhzhia Oblast	18 June 2025	Old name did not match Ukrainian language standards; renamed under the Soviet Union in an attempt to erase German heritage
Volna Волна	Khvylove; Хвильове	Village	Melitopol Raion	Zaporizhzhia Oblast	18 June 2025	Old name did not match Ukrainian language standards
Voskhod Восход	Kovylne; Ковильне	Village	Melitopol Raion	Zaporizhzhia Oblast	18 June 2025	Old name did not match Ukrainian language standards
Yurivka Юр'ївка	Yuriivka; Юріївка	Village	Melitopol Raion	Zaporizhzhia Oblast	18 June 2025	Old name did not match Ukrainian language standards
Chervone Червоне	Vysoke; Високе	Village	Polohy Raion	Zaporizhzhia Oblast	26 September 2024	Old name alluded to the color red
Chkalova Чкалова	Merezhne; Мережне	Village	Polohy Raion	Zaporizhzhia Oblast	26 September 2024	Previously named after Valery Chkalov
Kutuzivka Кутузівка	Petershahen; Петерсгаген	Village	Polohy Raion	Zaporizhzhia Oblast	26 September 2024	Previously named after Mikhail Kutuzov; renamed under the Soviet Union in an attempt to erase German heritage
Obshche Обще	Soniachne; Сонячне	Village	Polohy Raion	Zaporizhzhia Oblast	18 June 2025	Old name did not match Ukrainian language standards
Ozherelne Ожерельне	Dzherelne; Джерельне	Village	Polohy Raion	Zaporizhzhia Oblast	18 June 2025	Old name did not match Ukrainian language standards
Pershotravneve Першотравневе	Malyi Verder; Малий Вердер	Village	Polohy Raion	Zaporizhzhia Oblast	26 September 2024	Old name alluded to the First of May; renamed under the Soviet Union in an attempt to erase German heritage
Michurina Мічуріна	Symyrenkove; Симиренкове	Village	Vasylivka Raion	Zaporizhzhia Oblast	26 September 2024	Previously named after Ivan Michurin
Moskovka Московка	Adrianivka; Адріанівка	Village	Zaporizhzhia Raion	Zaporizhzhia Oblast	26 September 2024	Previously named after Moscow
Novotavrycheske Новотавричеське	Novotavriiske; Новотаврійське	Rural settlement	Zaporizhzhia Raion	Zaporizhzhia Oblast	18 June 2025	Old name did not match Ukrainian language standards
Rostushche Ростуще	Velyka Komyshuvatka; Велика Комишуватка	Rural settlement	Zaporizhzhia Raion	Zaporizhzhia Oblast	18 June 2025	Old name did not match Ukrainian language standards
Ukromne Укромне	Hofeld; Гофельд	Village	Zaporizhzhia Raion	Zaporizhzhia Oblast	18 June 2025	Old name did not match Ukrainian language standards; renamed under the Soviet Union in an attempt to erase German heritage
Yulivka Юльївка	Yuliivka; Юліївка	Village	Zaporizhzhia Raion	Zaporizhzhia Oblast	18 June 2025	Old name did not match Ukrainian language standards
Pershotravneve Першотравневе	Lebedynske; Лебединське	Rural settlement	Berdychiv Raion	Zhytomyr Oblast	26 September 2024	Old name alluded to the First of May
Pidhorodne Підгородне	Pidhorodnie; Підгороднє	Village	Berdychiv Raion	Zhytomyr Oblast	26 September 2024	Old name did not match Ukrainian language standards
Pershotravneve Першотравневе	Kvartsytne; Кварцитне	Rural settlement	Korosten Raion	Zhytomyr Oblast	26 September 2024	Old name alluded to the First of May
Pershotravneve Першотравневе	Temianets; Тем'янець	Village	Korosten Raion	Zhytomyr Oblast	26 September 2024	Old name alluded to the First of May
Pershotravneve Першотравневе	Zatyshok; Затишок	Village	Korosten Raion	Zhytomyr Oblast	26 September 2024	Old name alluded to the First of May
Krasnohirka Красногірка	Hranitne; Гранітне	Village	Zhytomyr Raion	Zhytomyr Oblast	26 September 2024	Old name alluded to the color red
Peremoha Перемога	Didushanka; Дідушанка	Village	Zhytomyr Raion	Zhytomyr Oblast	26 September 2024	Previously named after the Peremoha (Victory) collective farm
Zhovtnivka Жовтнівка	Polishchuky; Поліщуки	Village	Zhytomyr Raion	Zhytomyr Oblast	26 September 2024	Previously named after the October Revolution
Novohrad-Volynskyi Новоград-Волинський	Zviahel; Звягель	City	Novohrad-Volynskyi → Zviahel Raion	Zhytomyr Oblast	16 November 2022	Renamed under the Russian Empire
Pershotravensk Першотравенськ	Portselianove; Порцелянове	Rural settlement	Novohrad-Volynskyi → Zviahel Raion	Zhytomyr Oblast	26 September 2024	Old name alluded to the First of May

== See also ==
- Decommunization in Ukraine
- KyivNotKiev
- List of renamed cities in Ukraine
- Renaming of Crimean toponyms
