= Brusturi =

Brusturi may refer to several places in Europe:

== Romania ==
- Brusturi, Bihor, a commune in Bihor County
- Brusturi, Neamț, a commune in Neamţ County
- Brusturi, a village in Hălmagiu Commune, Arad County
- Brusturi, a village in Finiș Commune, Bihor County
- Brusturi, a village in Creaca Commune, Sălaj County
- Brestovăț, a commune in Timiș County, briefly called Brusturi

== Ukraine ==
- Brusturi, Zakarpattia Oblast, a village
