= Katlabuh =

Rural locality in Odesa Oblast, Ukraine

Katlabuh Катлабуг
- Rural settlement
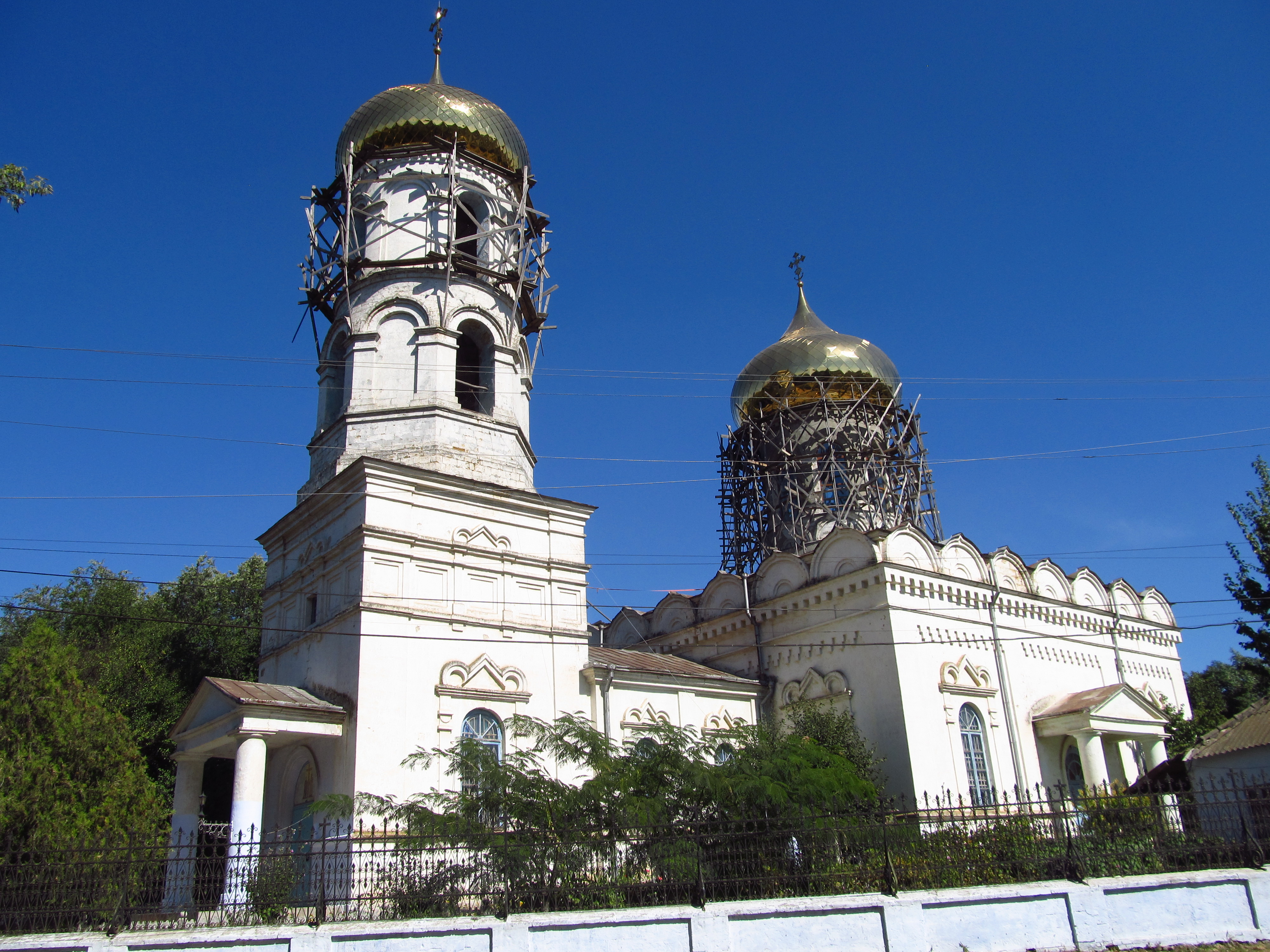

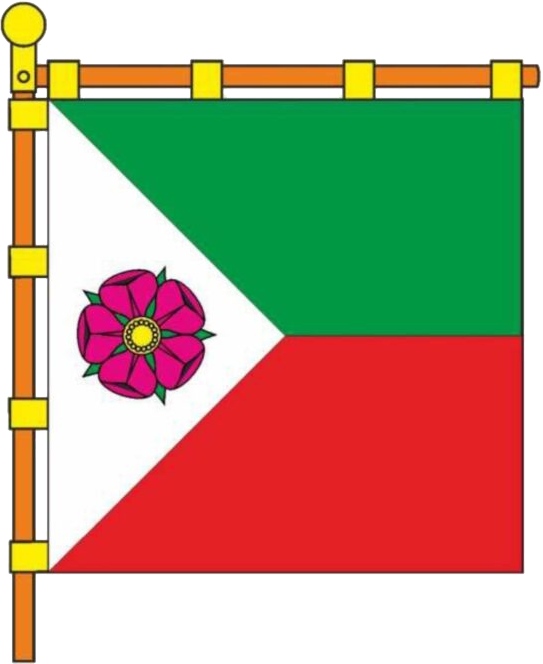
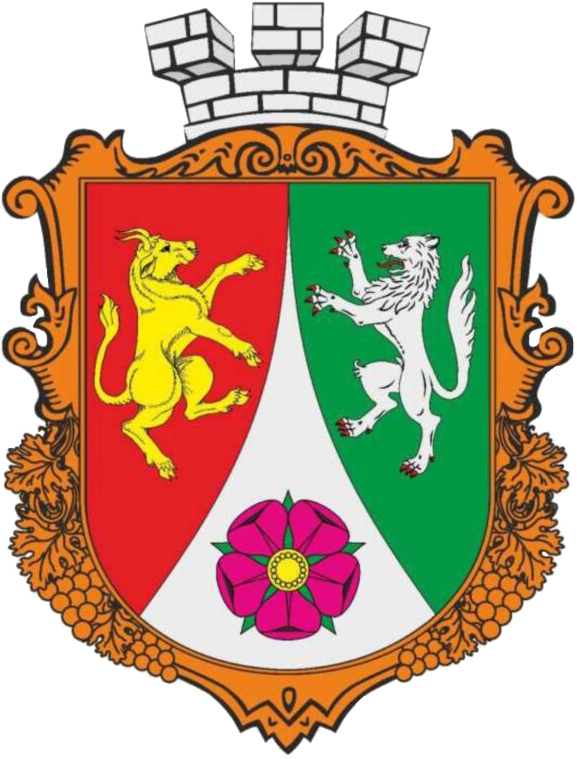
- Flag Coat of arms
- Interactive map of Katlabuh
- Location within Odesa Oblast Location within Ukraine
- Coordinates: 45°34′55″N 28°59′02″E
- Country: Ukraine
- Oblast: Odesa Oblast
- Raion: Izmail Raion
- Hromada: Katlabuh settlement hromada

Population (2022)
  - Total: 4,548
- Time zone: UTC+2 (EET)
  - Summer (DST): UTC+3 (EEST)

Katlabuh (Ukrainian: Катлабуг; Romanian: Șichirlichitai), formerly known as Suvorove (Ukrainian: Суворове; Russian: Суворово, romanized: Suvorovo) is a rural settlement in Izmail Raion of Odesa Oblast in Ukraine. It is located at the northern end of Lake Katlabuh in the river delta of the Danube. Katlabuh hosts the administration of Katlabuh settlement hromada, one of the hromadas of Ukraine. Population: 4,548 (2022 estimate)

== History ==
Following the electronic vote of the settlement population, the settlement council voted on 26 December 2022 to rename Suvorove to Bessarabske.

Until 26 January 2024, Suvorove was designated urban-type settlement. On this day, a new law entered into force which abolished this status, and Suvorove became a rural settlement.

On 3 April 2024, the Committee on the Organization of State Power, Local Self-government, Regional Development, and Urban Planning of the Verkhovna Rada stated their support for renaming the settlement to Shykyrlyk (Шикирлик). In September 2024, Suvorove was renamed to Katlabuh.

== Economy ==
=== Transportation ===
Katlabuh is close to the railway connecting Izmail and Artsyz with the further connection to Odesa. The closest station, Kotlabuh railway station, is approximately 5 kilometres (3.1 mi) north of the city. There is infrequent passenger traffic.

The settlement has access to Highway M15 connecting Odesa with Reni via Ismail and further crossing into Moldova and Romania.
