= Stepne rural hromada, Zaporizhzhia Oblast =

Stepne rural hromada Степненська селищна громада
- Hromada
- Interactive map of Stepne rural hromada
- Country: Ukraine
- Oblast: Zaporizhzhia Oblast
- Raion: Zaporizhzhia Raion

Area
  - Total: 94.6 km^{2} (36.5 sq mi)

Population (2020)
  - Total: 5,431
  - Density: 57.4/km^{2} (149/sq mi)
- Settlements: 8
- Rural settlements: 2
- Villages: 6

Stepne rural hromada (Ukrainian: Степненська селищна громада) is a hromada of Ukraine, located in Zaporizhzhia Raion, Zaporizhzhia Oblast. Its administrative center is the village of Stepne.

It has an area of 94.6 square kilometres (36.5 mi^{2}) and a population of 5,431, as of 2020.

The hromada contains 8 settlements, including 2 rural settlements (Ivano-Hannivka and Velyka Komyshuvatka), and 6 villages:

- Lezhyne
- Natalivka
- Novostepnianske
- Stepne
- Cherepivske
- Shevchenkivske

== See also ==
- List of hromadas of Ukraine
