= Katlabuh settlement hromada =

Coordinates: 45°40′17.9″N 29°04′16.7″E

Katlabuh settlement hromada Катлабузька селищна громада
- Hromada
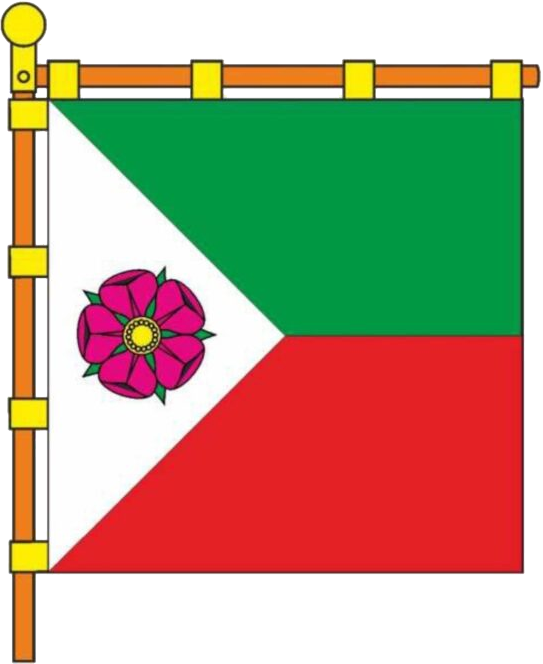
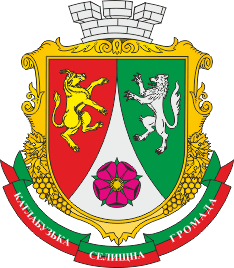
- Flag Coat of arms
- Interactive map of Katlabuh settlement hromada
- Country: Ukraine
- Oblast: Odesa Oblast
- Raion: Izmail Raion
- Admin. center: Katlabuh

Area
  - Total: 376.0 km^{2} (145.2 sq mi)

Population (2020)
  - Total: 11,994
  - Density: 31.90/km^{2} (82.62/sq mi)
- CATOTTG code: UA51100170000087238
- Settlements: 17
- Rural settlements: 2
- Villages: 15

Katlabuh settlement hromada (Ukrainian: Катлабузька селищна громада), previously Suvorove settlement hromada, is a hromada in Izmail Raion of Odesa Oblast in southwestern Ukraine. Population: 11,994 (2020 est.)

The hromada consists of two rural settlements (Dzynilor and Katlabuh) and 5 villages:

- Kyrnychky
- Nova Pokrovka
- Ostrivne, Ukraine
- Pryozerne
- Stari Troiany

Suvorove settlement hromada had 13,418 inhabitants in 2001, out of which 6,817 spoke Bulgarian (50.8%), 640 spoke Ukrainian (4.77%), 2,643 spoke Romanian (19.7%), 1,579 spoke Russian (11.77%), and 1,631 spoke Gagauz (12.16%).

== Links ==
- Суворовська територіальна громада на порталі «Децентралізація»
