= Pryozerne, Izmail Raion, Odesa Oblast =

Pryozerne Приозерне Ceamașir
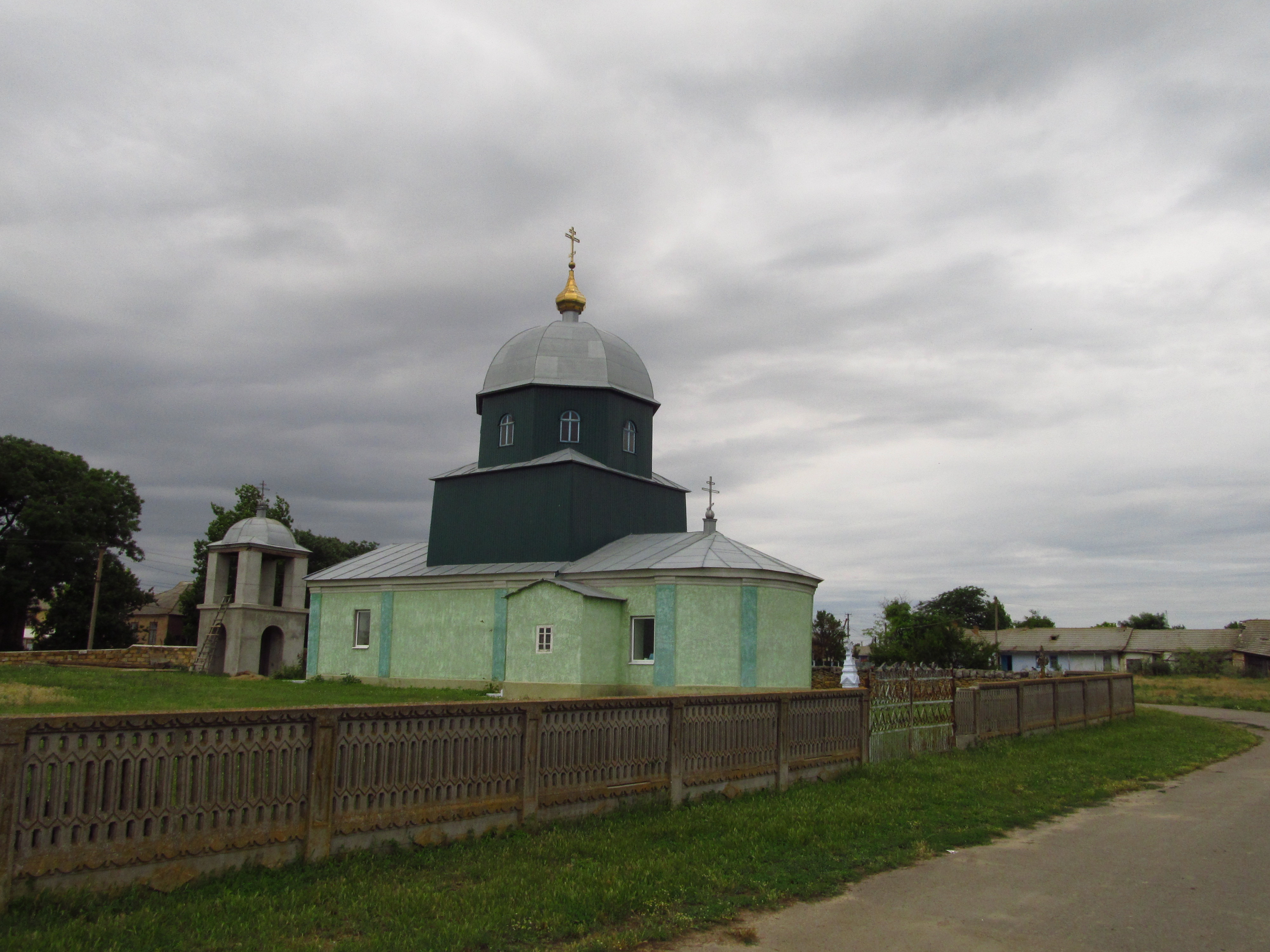

- Location in Ukraine
- Coordinates: 45°31′N 29°36′E
- Country: Ukraine
- Oblast: Odesa Oblast
- Raion: Izmail Raion
- Hromada: Suvorove settlement hromada
- Time zone: UTC+2 (EET)
  - Summer (DST): UTC+3 (EEST)

Pryozerne (Ukrainian: Приозерне; Romanian: Ceamașir) is a village in the Izmail Raion (district) of the Odesa Oblast, Ukraine. It belongs to Suvorove settlement hromada, one of the hromadas of Ukraine. The population, composed of 1,778 people, is predominantly Moldovan (Romanian). In 2001, 93.42% of the inhabitants spoke Romanian as their native language, while 2.08% spoke Ukrainian and 2,25% spoke Russian.
