= Katerynivka =

Katerynivka (Ukrainian: Катеринівка) may refer to several populated places in Ukraine:

- Katerynivka, Luhansk Oblast, an urban-type settlement
- Katerynivka, Sievierodonetsk Raion, Luhansk Oblast, a village
- Katerynivka, Donetsk Oblast, a village
- Katerynivka, Lyman urban hromada, Kramatorsk Raion, Donetsk Oblast, a village
- Katerynivka, Popasna Raion, a village
- Katerynivka, Ternopil Oblast, a village
- The former name of Artemivsk, Luhansk Oblast

== See also ==
- Caterinovca, a village in Moldova
