= Velyka Komyshuvatka =

Velyka Komyshuvatka Велика Комишуватка
- Rural settlement
- Location of Velyka Komyshuvatka in Zaporizhzhia Oblast
- Coordinates: 47°48′37″N 35°17′00″E
- Country: Ukraine
- Oblast: Zaporizhzhia Oblast
- Raion: Zaporizhzhia Raion
- Hromada: Stepne rural hromada
- Founded: 1946

Area
  - Total: 2.3 km^{2} (0.89 sq mi)
- Elevation: 75 m (246 ft)

Population (2001)
  - Total: 139
  - Density: 60/km^{2} (160/sq mi)
- Time zone: UTC+2 (EET)
  - Summer (DST): UTC+3 (EEST)
- Postal code: 70432
- Area code: +380 612
- Website: http://rada.gov.ua/

Velyka Komyshuvatka (Ukrainian: Велика Комишуватка), formerly Rostushche (Ростуще), is a rural settlement in the Zaporizhzhia Raion (district) of Zaporizhzhia Oblast in southern Ukraine. Its population was 139 in the 2001 Ukrainian Census. Administratively, it belongs to the Stepne Rural Council, a local government area.

On 18 June 2025, the Verkhovna Rada renamed the rural settlement to Velyka Komyshuvatka, as the name Rostushche did not match Ukrainian language standards.
