= Zdorivka, Kirovohrad Oblast =

Zdorivka Здорівка
- Village
- Location within Ukraine Kirovohrad Oblast Location within Ukraine
- Coordinates: 48°20′06″N 32°33′25″E
- Country: Ukraine
- Oblast: Kirovohrad Oblast
- Raion: Kropyvnytskyi Raion
- Hromada: Novhorodka settlement hromada
- KATOTTH code: UA35040230190056533

Zdorivka (Ukrainian: Здорівка), formerly known as Pershe Travnia (Ukrainian: Перше Травня), is a village in Ukraine, located in Novhorodka settlement hromada, Kropyvnytskyi Raion, Kirovohrad Oblast. It had a population of five people as of 2001.

Due to the law "On the Condemnation and Prohibition of Propaganda of Russian Imperial Policy in Ukraine and the Decolonization of Toponymy" (in April 2023 signed by President Volodymyr Zelenskyy) every toponomy in Ukraine with the name "Pershe Travnia" (a reference to the International Workers' Day) was set to be renamed. Pershe Travnia was renamed in September 2024.
