= Olzhyne, Beryslav Raion =

Village in Kherson Oblast, Ukraine

Olzhyne Ольжине
- Village
- Interactive map of Olzhyne
- Olzhyne in the Kherson Oblast Olzhyne (Ukraine)
- Coordinates: 47.475278°N 33.487778°E
- Country: Ukraine
- Oblast: Kherson Oblast
- Raion: Beryslav Raion
- Hromada: Vysokopillia settlement hromada
- Founded: 1869

Area
  - Total: 15.09 km^{2} (5.83 sq mi)
- Elevation: 82 m (269 ft)

Population (2001 census)
  - Total: 419
  - Density: 27.8/km^{2} (71.9/sq mi)
- Time zone: UTC+2 (EET)
  - Summer (DST): UTC+3 (EEST)
- Postal code: 74041
- Area code: +380 553

Olzhyne (Ukrainian: Ольжине; Russian: Ольгино; German: Schöntal, Eigental), formerly known as Olhyne (Ukrainian: Ольгине), is a village in Beryslav Raion (district) in Kherson Oblast of southern Ukraine, at about 120.8 kilometres (75.1 mi) northeast by north from the centre of Kherson city. It belongs to Vysokopillia settlement hromada, one of the hromadas of Ukraine.

== History ==
The village was informally settled in 1869 on the lands bought from the Russian statesman, Viktor Kochubey. The founders were German colonists and Mennonites who had previously lived on the Molochna. In 1875, a deed for the purchase of the 13,500 acres of land was issued to accommodate three German colonies in the Taurida Governorate. The modern-day village of Olzhyne that was created by this deed went under the name of Neu-Karlsruhe, or Karlsruhe, during this time.

The first settlers in this now formalized city were Germans of the Lutheran faith from Molochansk. Later, it would be renamed Olhyne, in honour of Kochubey's daughter, Princess Olha. The Soviet Union took control over the village in 1918, and in 1927, the village council was formed together with that of the other formerly German villages. During the year 1929, the first joint land cultivation association was founded. During the Great Patriotic War, the village was occupied by German troops from 14 September 1941 to 31 October 1943.

The settlement came under attack by Russian forces during the Russian invasion of Ukraine in 2022.

In September 2024, Olhyne was renamed to Olzhyne to conform with the norms of the Ukrainian language.

== Demographics ==
The settlement had 419 inhabitants in 2001; native language distribution as of the Ukrainian Census of the same year:

- Ukrainian: 75.45%
- Russian: 22.51%
