= Brustury, Zakarpattia Oblast =

Village in Zakarpattia Oblast, Ukraine

Brustury Брустури Brusztura
- Village
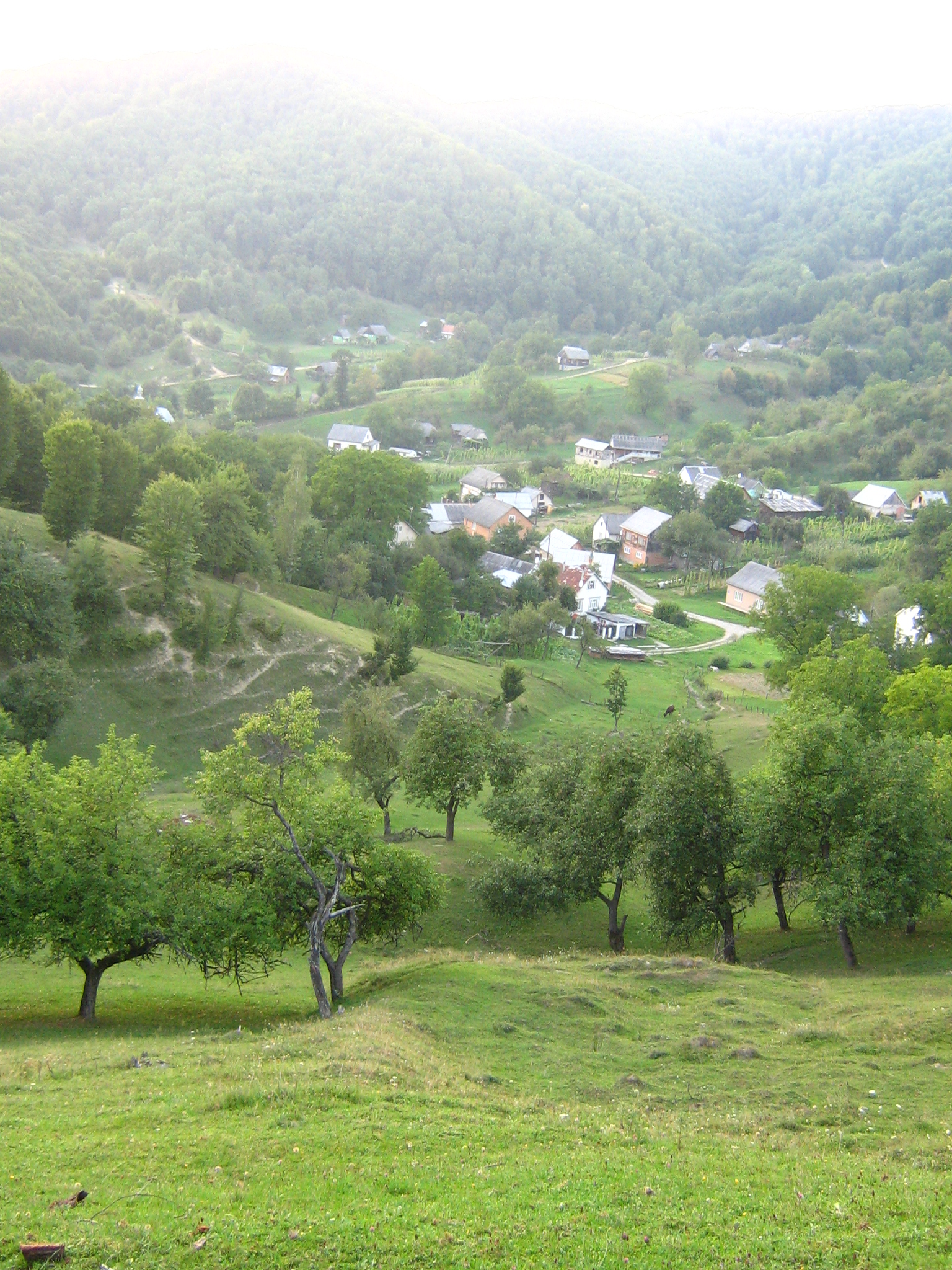
- Interactive map of Brustury
- Location within Zakarpattia Oblast Location within Ukraine
- Coordinates: 48°21′49″N 23°57′59″E
- Country: Ukraine
- Oblast: Zakarpattia Oblast
- Raion: Tiachiv Raion
- Elevation: 599 m (1,965 ft)

Population (2001)
  - Total: 3,317
- Time zone: UTC+2 (EET)
  - Summer (DST): UTC+3 (EEST)

Brustury (Брустури; Hungarian: Brusztura; Yiddish: Brister), known before 2023 as Lopukhiv (Ukrainian: Лопухів), is a village in Tiachiv Raion of Zakarpattia Oblast in Ukraine.

== History ==
The village was first mentioned in 1638, when the village was called Brusztura. It comes from the Romanian word "brustur", meaning heart-shaped comfrey.

After it was incorporated into the Ukrainian SSR as part of the Ukrainianization of the Carpathians, the village was renamed Lopukhiv.

On June 29, 2023, the Verkhovna Rada officially renamed the village to Brustury as part of the derussification in Ukraine.

== Geography ==
Brustury is located on both sides of the river Brusturyanka, 67 km (42 mi) from the district center Tiachiv.

== Demographics ==
Native language as of the Ukrainian Census of 2001:

- Ukrainian 99.64%
- Others 0.36%
