= Kuzmino =

Kuzmino is the name of several rural localities in Russia:

- Kuzmino, Kochyovsky District, Perm Krai
- Kuzmino, Melenkovsky District, Vladimir Oblast
- Kuzmino, Sobinsky District, Vladimir Oblast
- Kuzmino, Vyaznikovsky District, Vladimir Oblast
- Kuzmino, Cherepovetsky District, Vologda Oblast
- Kuzmino, Kichmengsko-Gorodetsky District, Vologda Oblast
- Kuzmino, Rodnikovsky District, Ivanovo Oblast

== See also ==
- Kuzmyno, a village in Zakarpattia Oblast, Ukraine
