= Elizaveta Levkovich =

Soviet microbiologist and virologist (1900–1982)

- Born: 20 April 1900; Gorki, Smolensk Governorate, Russian Empire
- Died: 24 February 1982 (aged 81); Moscow, Soviet Union
- Resting place: Vvedenskoe cemetery
- Education: Astrakhan Medical Institute
- Known for: Discovery of Tick-borne encephalitis virus (TBEV); Vaccine for TBEV
- Awards: Stalin Prize of First Degree in Science and Technology(1941); Badge for Outstanding work in healthcare (1941); Order of the Badge of Honour; D.I. Ivanovsky Prize (1960)
- Scientific career
- Fields: Microbiology; virology
- Workplaces: Microbiology institute of Narkomzdrav USSR; Mechnikov Institute of Vaccines and Sera; D.I.Ivanovsky Institute of Virology, Moscow, USSR; M.P. Chumakov Institute of Poliomyelitis

Elizaveta Nikolaevna Levkovich (Note: Russian: Елизавета Николаевна Левкович) (née Ovchinnikova; (Note: Овчинникова) 20 April 1900 – 24 February 1982) was a Soviet virologist. Levkovich was the deputy head of the expedition that discovered tick-borne encephalitis virus (TBEV) in 1937, when her group isolated the virus from brain tissue. She was among the developers of the first vaccine in 1939. In this way, she made vital contributions to the establishment of the field of arbovirology.

== Early life and education ==
Elizaveta Ovchinnikova was born in Gorki, a village in the Smolensk Governorate of the Russian Empire. She was an excellent student, finishing a women's gymnasium with a gold medal. In her final years of school, Levkovich started working as a tutor to support her visually impaired mother and younger brother. In 1917, the family moved to Astrakhan, where Levkovich began working as a bookkeeper. During this time, she met her future husband Roman Levkovich. In 1920, Levkovich began her studies at Astrakhan State Medical University, graduating in 1925.

== Scientific career ==
After completing her education, Levkovich worked as a junior doctor at Botkin hospital in Moscow for a year. Following this, she moved to epidemiological control and laboratory work in Grozny. In 1928, she began her Candidate of Sciences dissertation at the Microbiology Institute of Narkomzdrav, where she continued to work after her graduation.

In 1935, a virology laboratory was created at Mechnikov Institute of Vaccines and Sera. In 1937, Levkovich was invited to lead the institute's neurotropic virus department.

=== Far East Expeditions and Discovery of Tick-Borne Encephalitis Virus (TBEV) ===
In 1937, Levkovich headed the Northern group of Lev Zilber's expedition to the Far East looking for the pathogen causing outbreaks of neurotropic infections. Many notable Soviet virologists participated in the expedition, including Mikhail Chumakov. The expedition successfully identified Ixodes ticks as the spreader of infection. Levkovich established that a specific type of antibody increased in the patient's blood during the recovery stage, which allowed for serotherapy to be trialled by A.N. Shapoval and Chumakov. The expedition identified 29 strains of the new virus. 15 September 1937, Pravda newspaper reported the remarkable achievements of the expedition.

In October of the same year, Zilber was accused of spying for Japan and was sent to the Gulag, alongside the leader of the Southern expedition group, Alexandra Shelbodaieva, and epidemiologist Tamara Safonova. Zilber and Shelbodaieva were removed from the list of authors in the expedition's publications.

Expeditions continued in 1938-1940 under the new leadership of Yevgeny Pavlovsky, together with virologist Anatolii Smorodintsev and epidemiologist Isaak Rogozin. Levkovich remained the head of the Northern group. The expedition focused on circulation of the virus, contributing to the development of Pavlovsky's natural nidality theory.

The research was complicated not only by the deteriorating relationship with Japan, but the dangers that the disease posed to the scientists. Several members of the expedition contracted encephalitis; several of them died and some experienced life-long consequences of the disease.

=== TBEV Vaccine and scientific leadership ===
The work to develop preventative measures against encephalitis began soon after the virus was isolated. The work was largely done by women: Nadezhda Kagan and Levkovich. Kagan died from encephalitis in autumn 1938, so Levkovich, who had just returned from summer 1938 expedition, took over the work.

The vaccine was first tested on the researchers themselves in 1939 and limited trials were conducted in 1941, though some questions about vaccine efficiency and quality of the trials remained. The Walter Reed Army Institute of Research began production of it. A 1963 review by Telford H. Work in Bulletin of the World Health Organization described the vaccine as "effective." Based on the encephalitis research, in 1941 Levkovich defended her doctor of sciences dissertation on "Virological and immunological characteristics of tick-borne spring-summer encephalitis." In the same year, she was awarded the Stalin Prize alongside other colleagues who participated in the expedition.

During the war, Levkovich evacuated to Tomsk, where she led encephalitis and typhus laboratories, working on development of a typhus vaccine. Following the creation of the Ivanovsky Institute of Virology, Levkovich was invited to lead the encephalitis laboratory there. In 1960, her laboratory was moved to the Chumakov Institute of Poliomyelitis and Viral Encephalitides.

Throughout those institutional changes, Levkovich continued her encephalitis vaccine research, seeking to replace mouse-brain tissue, which had been known to provoke severe reactions, with chicken embryos. In her laboratory she trained a new generation of virologists, many of them women. Levkovich and her lab conducted a series of experiments on the relationship between TBEVs and growth of cancerous cells, including using HeLa cells.

== Retirement, death, and legacy ==
Following her retirement in 1970, Levkovich became a scientific consultant to the Institute, which she remained until her death.

Levkovich died in February 1982 in Moscow and was buried in the 5th section of Vvedenskoye Cemetery. In 2001, Levkovich's students and colleagues published a volume of reminiscences about their work with her.

Levkovich's stepson form her second marriage to microbiologist Gregory Sinai (married in 1940), Yakov Sinai, became a notable mathematician.

== Some English-language publications ==
- E.N. Levkovich, A.K. Shubladze, M.P. Chumakov, and V.D. Soloviev, "Aetiology of spring-summer encephalitis," Arch. sc. biol., vol. 52, no. 1 (1938), p. 162;
- E.N. Levkovich, A.Ya. Goldfeld, O.E. Rzhakhova, "The effect of shortwave length ultraviolet rays on the infectiosity and antigenic properties of the viruses of Russian tick-borne and Japanese encephalitis," Bulletin of Experimental Biology and Medicine, vol. 44, no. 1 (1957), pp. 843–847;
- E.N. Levkovich, G.I. Sergeeva, "Inhibitory action of viruses of the tick-borne encephalitis complex differing in neurovirulence on mouse tumors in vivo," Bulletin of experimental biology and medicine, vol. 64, no. 2 (1967), pp. 885–887;
- N.V. Loginova, L.G. Karpovich, E.N. Levkovich, E.A. Ovchinnikova, "Study of reproduction of some arboviruses at a raised temperature as a genetic marker," Bulletin of experimental biology and medicine, vol. 64, no. 3 (1967), pp. 1013–1015;
- E.N. Levkovich, "Virologic aspects in studies of Japanese and tick-borne encephalitis," Japanese Journal of Medical Science & Biology, vol. 20, Supplement (December 1967), pp. 138–141.
