= Mukachevo urban hromada =

Urban hromada in Zakarpattia Oblast, Ukraine

Mukachevo urban hromada Мукачівська міська громада
- Hromada
- Location within Zakarpattia Oblast Location within Ukraine
- Coordinates: 48°27′00″N 22°45′00″E
- Country: Ukraine
- Oblast (province): Zakarpattia Oblast
- Raion (district): Mukachevo Raion

Area
  - Total: 266.9 km^{2} (103.1 sq mi)

Population (2023)
  - Total: 110,483

Mukachevo urban territorial hromada (Ukrainian: Мукачівська міська територіальна громада, romanized: Mukachivska miska terytorialna hromada) is a hromada of Ukraine, located in the western Zakarpattia Oblast. Its capital is the city of Mukachevo.

Mukachevo urban hromada has a total population of 110,483, as of 2023. It additionally has an area of 266.9 km^{2} (103.1 mi^{2}).

== Settlements ==
In addition to one city (Mukachevo), the hromada includes 17 villages:

- Barbovo
- Horbok
- Dertsen
- Dorobratovo
- Zavydovo
- Zaluzhzhia
- Kliucharky
- Lavky
- Makarovo
- Nehrovo
- Nyzhnii Koropets
- Nove Davydkovo
- Pavshyno
- Pistrialovo
- Romochevytsia
- Fornosh
- Shenborn
