= Anatolii Smorodintsev =

Soviet microbiologist, virologist (1901-1986)

Anatolii Aleksandrovich Smorodintsev
- Born: 6 (19) April 1901; Askino, Ufa Governorate, Russian Empire
- Died: 6 August 1986 (aged 85); Leningrad, Soviet Union
- Education: Tomsk State University
- Known for: Vaccine research including Clinical trial of Oral Polio Vaccine
- Awards: Stalin Prize of First Degree in Science and Technology(1941); Lenin Prize in Science and Technology (1963)
- Scientific career
- Fields: Microbiology, Virology
- Workplaces: Leningrad Institute of Epidemiology and Microbiology of L. Pasteur (1933-1937), All-Soviet Institute of Experimental Medicine (Moscow, 1938-1945), Institute of Experimental Medicine (Leningrad, 1946-1967), All-Soviet Institute of Influenza

Anatolii Aleksandrovich Smorodintsev (Russian: Анатолий Александрович Смородинцев, 6 [19] April 1901 – 6 August 1986) was a Soviet virologist and immunologist, best known for his vaccine research, including trials of oral polio vaccine (OPV) developed by Albert B. Sabin, which Smorodintsev conducted together with Mikhail Chumakov.

Smorodintsev was the founder and first director of Research Institute of Influenza in St. Petersburg and a member of the Academy of Medical Sciences of the USSR from 1966 (corresponding member from 1945).

== Education ==
Smorodintsev was born in Askino village in the Ufa Governorate of the Russian Empire in a doctor's family. After graduating from a real school, he enrolled at the Department of Medicine of Tomsk University. He graduated in 1923 and remained at the University's Bacteriology Institute as an assistant.

In 1924, he was drafted into the Red Army to serve as a doctor on the Central Asian front.

== Career ==
During his time in Central Asia, Smorodintsev participated in malaria prevention under the leadership of N.I. Latyshev and S.V. Viskovskii. After leaving the army in 1926, he moved to Leningrad to join the Institute of Experimental Medicine and lead the bacteriological laboratory of the Central Institute of Obstetrics and Gynaecology. There he engaged in studies of staphylococcus infections and typhoid fever.

In 1933, Smorodintsev was appointed head of bacteriology department of Leningrad Louis Pasteur Institute, where he began to focus on the study of influenza. He received the degree of Doctor of Medical Sciences in 1935.

=== All-Soviet Institute of Experimental Medicine and encephalitis research ===
In 1938, Smorodintsev became the first head of the Virology Department of the All-Soviet Institute of Experimental Medicine in Moscow. Following the dissolution of the institute, its virology department became the basis for the Ivanovskii Institute.

In 1938-1940, Smorodintsev participated in expeditions to the Far East to study tick-borne encephalitis led by Evgeny Pavlovsky, who took over following the arrest of Lev Zilber, the head of the original 1937 expedition that isolated the virus and identified ticks as the vector for the spread of infection.

During the Second World War, Smorodintsev's lab was evacuated to Siberia and Smorodintsev served as head epidemiologist in Tomsk in 1941-1942.

=== Return to Leningrad and polio vaccine research ===
Following the end of the war, Smorodintsev returned to Leningrad's Institute of Experimental Medicine to head the Virology Department there.

In 1956, Smorodintsev, Mikhail Chumakov (director of the newly-established Institute of Poliomyelitis), Marina K Voroshilova (senior researcher at the Institute) and Lev I. Lukin (of the Academy of Medical Sciences of the USSR) travelled to the United States to study American polio vaccine development, meeting Jonas Salk and Albert Sabin. Smorodintsev impressed as a "first-rate virologist" who could speak English. These visits were instrumental in the establishment of Soviet-American science diplomacy in the field of polio research, which resulted in several co-organised conferences and significant scientific exchange.

Smorodintsev initiated the study of Sabin's live poliovirus vaccine in the Soviet Union. In autumn 1956, Smorodintsev reached out to Sabin for samples of his live virus polio vaccine to be studied in his laboratory in Leningrad. Smorodintsev's department took a very active part in testing of Sabin's oral polio vaccine in the USSR, with Mikhail Chumakov. They tested Sabin's vaccine on 27,000 children in Estonia and Lithuania, and a Leningrad-produced vaccine on 12,000 children in Latvia. Smorodintsev's laboratory tested the safety of the new vaccine and checked the effectiveness of the immunisation programme that followed.

In 1959 oral polio vaccine field trials, Smorodintsev and his laboratory were responsible for the section of the trials in Leningrad, Moldova, and Belarus. The researchers concluded that the vaccine was safe and by June 1959, more than 3 million people had been vaccinated in Estonia. This spread to the other Soviet countries and by the end of 1959, more than 15 million people had been vaccinated, 1.5 million by Smorodintsev's team.

Dorothy Horstmann, who was sent by the WHO to report on standards of Soviet vaccination programme and associated testing, visited Smorodintsev's department in 16-20 September. Horstmann's endorsement of trials in the socialist bloc contributed to the licensing of the oral vaccine in the United States. Throughout the 1960s and 1970s, oral polio vaccine became the dominant vaccine technology around the globe. Looking back in 1985, Salk wrote that the vaccine's safety 'could not have been established without the most extensive studies by Chumakov et al., and Smorodintsev et al. in the USSR in 1959'.

For this research, Chumakov and Smorodintsev were awarded Lenin prize in 1963.

Studies by Smorodintsev and his lab continued to inform discussions of immunogenicity and safety of oral poliovirus vaccine into 2000s. Smorodintsev was recognised as making 'valuable' contributions on non-specific resistance in Advances in Virus Research.

=== Institute of Influenza and childhood vaccinations ===
In 1967, Smorodintsev became the director of the newly-founded Research Institute of Influenza. In 1972, he left this post to lead the department of flu prophylaxis. In 1975, he returned to Institute of Experimental Medicine's Virology Department for the third time.

His research in this period was chiefly dedicated to prevention of such diseases as measles, flu, rubella, and mumps. He held a number of patents related to prophylaxis of infectious diseases.

While Smorodintsev was advocated for vaccination programmes, he continued to support development of anti-viral drugs.

== Death and Legacy ==
Smorodintsev died 6 August 1986 in Leningrad. His son, Alexander Anatolievich Smorodintsev (1929-2022) was also a virologist.

Several research institutions are named after Smorodintsev:

- Institute of Experimental Medicine's Department of Virology is named after Smorodintsev;
- Research Institute of Influenza that Smorodintsev founded is now named after him.

Smorodintsev's contributions to research were recognised in journals from various countries on his 70th, 75th and 80th birthdays, and on his death.

== Notable Publications (in English) ==
- Smorodintsev, A.A. (1957). Factors of natural resistance and specific immunity to viruses. Virology, 3(2), 299-321. https://doi.org/10.1016/0042-6822(57)90095-8.
- Smorodintsev, A.A., Chudakov, V.G., Churilov, A.V. (1959). Haemorrhagic nephroso-nephritis.Translated by Catherine Matthews. New York: Pergamon Press Inc.
- Smorodintsev, A. A., Davidenkova, E. F., Drobyshevskaya, A. I., Ilyenko, V. I., Gorev, N. E. et al. (1959). Results of a study of the reactogenic and immunogenic properties of live anti-poliomyelitis vaccine. Bulletin of the World Health Organization, 20(6), 1053 - 1074.
- Smorodintsev, A. A. (1960). New live vaccines against virus diseases. American Journal of Public Health and the Nation’s Health, 50(6)Pt 2(6), 40–45. https://doi.org/10.2105/ajph.50.6_pt_2.40.
- Smorodintsev, A. A., Drobyshevskaya, A. I., Bulychev, N. P., Chalkina, O. M., Groisman, G. M. et al. (1960). Immunological and epidemiological effectiveness of live poliomyelitis vaccine in the USSR*. Bulletin of the World Health Organization, 23(6), 705 - 725.
- Smorodintsev, A. A. (1968). The production and effect of interferon in organ cultures of calf trachea. British Journal of Experimental Pathology, 49(5), 511–515.
- Leshchinskaya, N. P., Ivanova, N. A., & Smorodintsev, A. A. (1968). Attempt to detect fowl leukemia virus in living virus vaccines prepared in eggs. Bulletin of Experimental Biology and Medicine, 66(2), 904–907. https://doi.org/10.1007/BF00794304.
- Smorodintsev, A. A., Dubov, A. V., Ilyenko, V. I., & Platonov, V. G. (1969). A new approach to development of live vaccine against tick-borne encephalitis. The Journal of Hygiene, 67(1), 13–20. https://doi.org/10.1017/S0022172400041371.
- Smorodintsev, A. A., Karpuhin, G. I., Zlydnikov, D. M., Malyševa, A. M., Švecova, E. G. et al. (1970). The prophylactic effectiveness of amantadine hydrochloride in an epidemic of Hong Kong influenza in Leningrad in 1969*. Bulletin of the World Health Organization, 42(6), 865 - 872.
- Smorodintsev, A. A., Nasibov, M. N. & Jakovleva, N. V. (1970). Experience with live rubella virus vaccine combined with live vaccines against measles and mumps*. Bulletin of the World Health Organization, 42(2), 283 - 289.
- Aleksandrova, G. I., Smorodintsev, A. A., Beljaeva, N. M., Vasil'ev, B. JA., Geft, R. A. et al. (1970). Testing the safety and effectiveness of oral administration of a live influenza vaccine*. Bulletin of the World Health Organization, 42(3), 429 - 436.
- Chetverikova, L. K., Polyak, R. Y., Yukhnova, L. G., & Smorodintsev, A. A. (1970). Method for Increasing the Regularity of Isolation of Infectious Ribonucleic Acid from Influenza Virus. Journal of Virology, 6(2), 183–187. https://doi.org/10.1128/jvi.6.2.183-187.1970.
- Zhilova, G. P., Alexandrova, G. I., Zykov, M. P., & Smorodintsev, A. A. (1977). Some Problems of Modern Influenza Prophylaxis with Live Vaccine. The Journal of Infectious Diseases, 135(4), 681–686. https://doi.org/10.1093/infdis/135.4.681.
- T. V. Peradze, & Smorodintsev, A. A. (1983). Epidemiology and Specific Prophylaxis of Measles. Reviews of Infectious Diseases, 5(3), 487–490. http://www.jstor.org/stable/4453062.
- Aleksandrova, G.I., Budilovsky, G.N., Koval, T.A., Polezhaev, F.I., Garmashova, L.M., Ghendon, Yu.Z., Romanova, Y.R., Smorodintsev, A.A. (June 1986). Study of live recombinant cold-adapted influenza bivalent vaccine of type A for use in children: an epidemiological control trial. Vaccine, 4(2), 114-118. https://doi.org/10.1016/0264-410X(86)90049-6.
