= Cold War tensions and the polio vaccine =

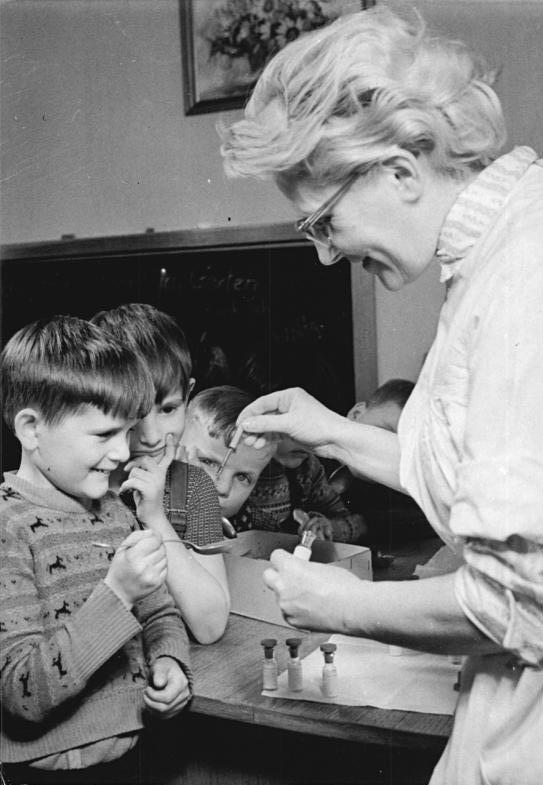
Kindergarten children receive oral polio vaccine in 1960 in East Germany.

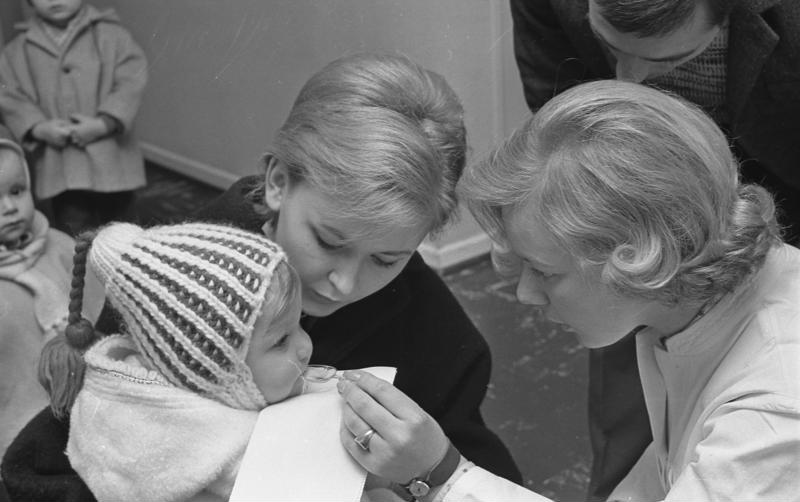
A child receives oral polio vaccine in 1967 in West Germany.

Polio (Infantile paralysis or poliomyelitis) epidemics were a concern during the summer months for children globally, with records of polio from the Egyptians and Greeks to the 1950s epidemics. Two U.S. virologists, Jonas Salk of the University of Pittsburgh and Albert B. Sabin of the University of Cincinnati emerged as the most prominent among dozens of American researchers on the quest for a polio vaccine.

== Salk's vaccine ==
By 1950, Jonas Salk had tested both live attenuated polio vaccines and formaldehyde-killed polio vaccines in monkeys and by 1952, began testing on humans. The killed vaccine, with proper filtration of the biological culture, was found to be effective. A problem with this vaccine was the perception that to be adequately protected, a child needed three properly spaced injections and a recommended booster shot every year, which was expensive. However, Jonas Salk stated in interviews that this perception was not true. The Salk vaccine was the first polio vaccine to receive approval of the U.S. government and was used in the United States until 1961, when the Sabin vaccine was recommended to replace it.

== Sabin's vaccine ==
Albert Sabin, a virologist who publicly disagreed with Salk and his killed vaccine, worked on creating a vaccine with live attenuated vaccines. In January 1956, despite Cold War tensions, Mikhail Chumakov, the director of Moscow's Polio Research Institute, along with his wife virologist Marina Voroshilova, and his colleague Anatoli Smorodentsev, traveled to the U.S. in order to study the Salk vaccine. They also visited the laboratory of Albert Sabin. With the clearance of the FBI, Sabin flew to Leningrad in June 1956. As a result of the cooperation between Sabin and Chumakov, Sabin was able to test his attenuated vaccine in the USSR when funding in America became unavailable. Sabin's work behind the Iron Curtain led to the determination that the Sabin–Chumakov vaccine was safe and effective.

== Cold war tensions ==
Cold War tensions caused Western scientists to discount reports from the Russians about the effectiveness of the Sabin vaccine. However, mass vaccinations of Sabin's vaccine spread throughout Eastern Europe from 1960 to 1963. Just as some Soviet virologists did not trust the American Salk vaccine, Americans had similar reservations about the Sabin vaccine. However, other Soviet virologists argued that the Salk vaccine could be considered safe because the Americans had tested it on their own people, and that the Sabin vaccine must be potentially dangerous because the Americans did not want to test it on their own society.

== Federal licensing ==
The documented achievement of the Sabin–Chumakov collaboration eventually overcame the ideological differences of the Cold War. Their oral live-virus vaccine became federally licensed in 1962, and was used for over three decades to help eliminate polio globally, replacing the Salk vaccine. Using these vaccines, the threat of polio remains a serious threat only in parts of Pakistan and Afghanistan.
