= Vyacheslav Medvid =

Soviet and Ukrainian footballer

Personal information
- Full name: Vyacheslav Yosypovych Medvid
- Date of birth: 28 August 1965 (age 61)
- Place of birth: Nove Davydkovo, Mukacheve Raion, Ukrainian SSR
- Height: 1.72 m (5 ft 8 in)
- Position: Midfielder

Senior career*
Years	Team	Apps	(Gls)
1982–1983	FC Zakarpattia Uzhhorod	47	(1)
1984	FC Metalist Kharkiv	22	(1)
1985	FSM Torpedo Moscow	5	(1)
1985–1987	PFC CSKA Moscow	91	(4)
1988–1990	FC SKA Karpaty Lviv	87	(9)
1990–1991	FC Metalist Kharkiv	37	(3)
1992	FC Zakarpattia Uzhhorod	21	(4)
1993	FC Nyva Ternopil	11	(0)
1993–1996	Debreceni VSC	47	(2)
1996–1997	Kabai Cukor FC	6	(0)
1996–2000	Gázszer FC	81	(10)
1999–2000	Hajdúszoboszlói Spartacus		
2001–2004	Ikarus BSE	28	(3)
Medal record
Men's football
Representing Soviet Union
UEFA European U-19 Championships
Runner-up	1984 Soviet Union
- * Club domestic league appearances and goals

Vyacheslav Yosypovych Medvid (Russian: В'ячеслав Йосипович Медвідь, born on 28 August 1965) is a former Soviet and Ukrainian footballer.

== See also ==
- Fedir Medvid
