= Iosifovna =

Iosifovna is a surname and middle name. Notable people with the name include:

== Surname ==
- Alexandra Iosifovna, Princess Alexandra of Saxe-Altenburg (1830–1911)

== Middle name ==
- Margarita Iosifovna Aliger (1915–1992), Soviet-Russian poet, translator, and journalist
- Svetlana Iosifovna Alliluyeva (1926–2011), daughter of the Soviet leader Joseph Stalin
- Tamara Iosifovna Balezina (1913–2010), Soviet Union-Russian microbiologist
- Naina Iosifovna Yeltsin (1931–2007), (Boris Yeltsin), President of Russia from 1991 to 1999
