= Bukovynka =

Bukovynka (Ukrainian: Буковинка) may refer to the following places in Ukraine:

- Bukovynka, Lviv Oblast, village in Sambir Raion, Lviv Oblast
- Bukovynka, Zakarpattia Oblast, village in Mukachevo Raion, Zakarpattia Oblast
