= Medvid =

Medvid is a Slavic surname. Notable people include:

- Fedir Medvid (1943–1997), Ukrainian footballer
- Ivan Medvid (born 1977), Bosnian footballer
- Liubomyr Medvid
- Mykhailo Medvid
- Vyacheslav Medvid (born 1965), Ukrainian footballer
