= Medveditsa =

Medveditsa may refer to:

- Medveditsa (Volga), a river in northwestern Russia
- Medveditsa (Don), a river in southwestern Russia
- Medveditsa, a rural locality in Volgograd Oblast

== See also ==
- Medved (disambiguation)
