= Medved =

Medved (Russian: медведь) means bear in several Slavic languages, including Slovenian, Russian, Czech, Serbian and Slovak. It may refer to:

- Medved (surname)
- Medved (rural locality), several rural localities in Novgorod Oblast, Russia
- Medved (hunting rifle), a Soviet hunting rifle
- Medved, an iconic bear in the Internet meme Preved

== See also ==
- Medvid
