= Obava =

Coordinates: 48°31′N 22°48′E

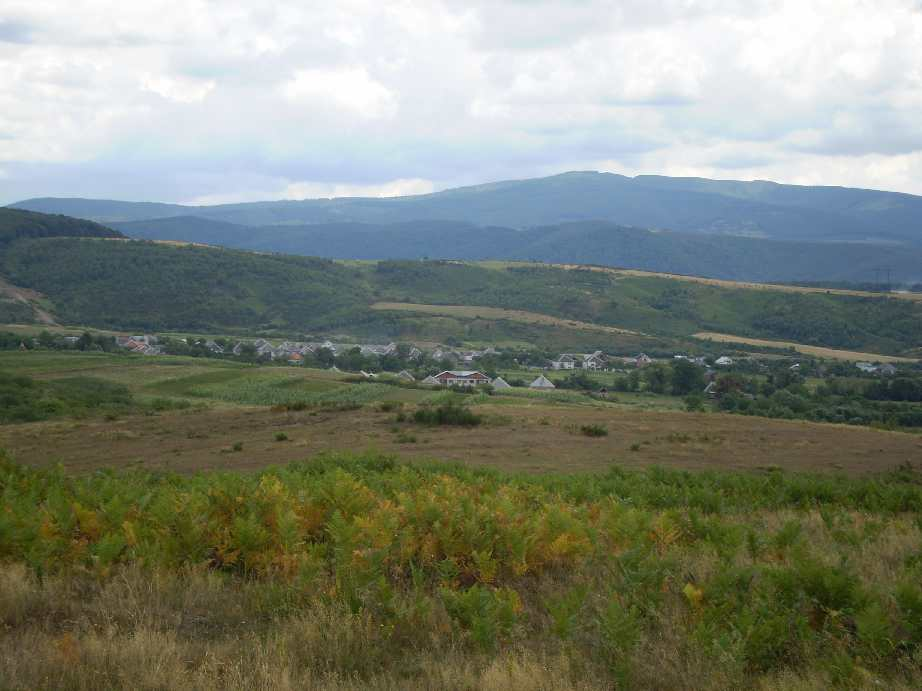
Obava

Obava (Ukrainian: Обава, Hungarian: Dunkófalva) is a village located in the Mukacheve Raion (district) in the Zakarpattia Oblast (province) in western Ukraine.

It has a population of 990.
