= Garry Abelev =

Russian immunologist

Garry Izrailevich Abelev
- Born: 10 January 1928; Moscow, RSFSR, Soviet Union
- Died: 23 December 2013 (aged 85); Moscow, Russian Federation
- Education: Moscow State University (1950)
- Known for: immunology, oncology
- Awards: 1975 William B. Coley Award; 1978 USSR State Prize; Honored Scientist of the Russian Federation (1998)
- Scientific career
- Fields: biochemistry
- Institutions: N.N. Blokhin Russian Cancer Research Center; N.F. Gamaleya Federal Research Center for Epidemiology & Microbiology; Moscow State University

Garry Izrailevich Abelev (Russian: Гарри Израйлевич Абелев; 10 January 1928 – 23 December 2013) was a Russian scientist, Academician of the Russian Academy of Sciences (since 2000), Doctor of Biological Sciences, Honored Scientist of the Russian Federation (1998). Laureate of the 1978 USSR State Prize.

== Biography ==
Abelev was born in Moscow in 1928.

He studied at the Lomonosov Moscow State University (now MSU) at the Faculty of Biology and Soil Science from 1945 and graduated from the Department of Biochemistry of Plants in 1950.

In 1955 he defended his candidate's dissertation. In 1963 he defended his doctoral dissertation.

He worked at the N.F. Gamaleya Federal Research Center for Epidemiology & Microbiology from 1950 to 1977. He was hired as a preparator in the Biochemistry Department, then moved to the Department of Virology and Immunology of Tumours under the lead of Lev Zilber. Abelev worked his way up to the head of the laboratory, and after Zilber's death he became head of the department.

From 1964 to 2006 he worked as a lecturer at the Department of Virology at Faculty of Biology at the Moscow State University. He has trained 22 Candidates and 4 Doctors of Sciences.

In 1967 he received the title of Professor. He was a member of the Russian Academy of Natural Sciences (since 1990) and the New York Academy of Sciences. He also was an honorary member of the European Association of Cancer Research and a member of the Russian Supervisory Board of the International Science Counsil.

In 1977, after a conflict with the directorate of the N.F. Gamaleya Federal Research Center for Epidemiology & Microbiology, his department was transferred to the N.N. Blokhin Russian Cancer Research Center.

Died in 2013 in Moscow.

== Research ==
In 1963, in an attempt to find specific tumour antigens, Abelev's department discovered an embryonic protein synthesised by liver cancer cells, α-fetoprotein. On this basis, the Abelev-Tatarinov reaction was developed for immunodiagnosis of liver cancer and teratoblastoma of the ovary. In addition, the detection of α-fetoprotein in hepatoma opened a new perspective on cancer as a reverse reprogramming of an adult cell into an embryonic cell.
