= Kolchyno =

Rural locality in Zakarpattia Oblast, Ukraine

Kolchyno Кольчино
- Rural settlement
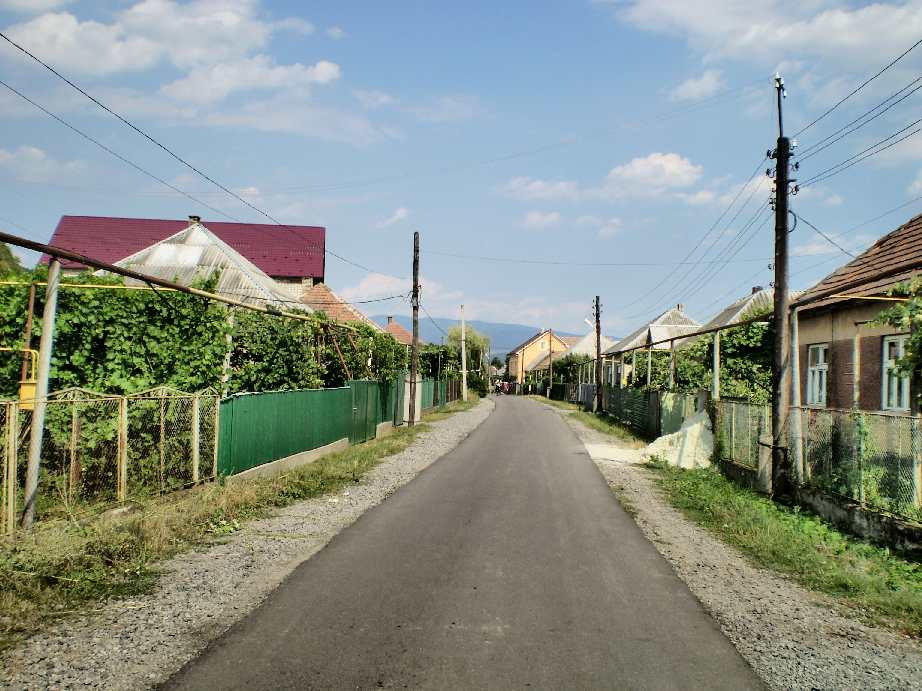
- Street of Kolchyno
- Interactive map of Kolchyno
- Location within Ukraine Location within Zakarpattia Oblast
- Coordinates: 48°28′30″N 22°45′09″E
- Country: Ukraine
- Oblast: Zakarpattia Oblast
- Raion: Mukachevo Raion
- Hromada: Kolchyno settlement hromada
- First mentioned: 1430
- Town status: 1976

Government
  - Village Head: Yuriy Udut
- Elevation: 132 m (433 ft)

Population (2022)
  - Total: ▼4,198
- Time zone: UTC+2 (EET)
  - Summer (DST): UTC+3 (EEST)
- Postal code: 89636
- Area code: +380 3131
- Website: http://rada.gov.ua/

Kolchyno (Ukrainian: Кольчино; Hungarian: Kölcsény; Slovak: Kolčino) is a rural settlement in Mukacheve Raion, Zakarpattia Oblast, western Ukraine. The town's population was 4,407 as of the 2001 Ukrainian Census. Current population: 4,198 (2022 estimate).

== History ==
Until 26 January 2024, Kolchyno was designated urban-type settlement. On this day, a new law entered into force which abolished this status, and Kolchyno became a rural settlement.
