= Fedir Medvid =

Ukrainian and Soviet football player

Ferenc Medvigy / Fedir Medvid
Personal information
- Full name: Fedir Yozhefovych Medvid
- Date of birth: 5 January 1943
- Place of birth: Újdávidháza, Hungary (today in the Zakarpattia Oblast of Ukraine)
- Date of death: 8 November 1997 (aged 54)
- Place of death: Kyiv, Ukraine
- Position: Midfielder

Senior career*
Years	Team	Apps	(Gls)
1958–1961	Spartak Uzhhorod		
1962–1972	FC Dynamo Kyiv		

International career
1966–1968	USSR	6	(1)

Managerial career
- 1973: FC Dynamo Kyiv (youth teams)
- 1973–1974: FC Bukovyna Chernivtsi
- 1974–1983: FC Dynamo Kyiv (youth teams)
- 1984–1994: Kyiv Sportinternat (youth team)
- 1994–1995: Ukraine-19
- * Club domestic league appearances and goals

Fedir Yozhefovich Medvid^{[a]} also known as Ferents Medvid (Ukrainian: Федір Йожефович Медвідь; Russian: Фёдор Йожефович Медведь, romanized: Fyodor Yozhefovich Medved; Hungarian: Ferenc Medvigy) was a Ukrainian and Soviet football player.

Medvid was born on 5 January 1943 in Újdávidháza, Hungary (today in the Zakarpattia Oblast of Ukraine). He died on 8 November 1997 in Kyiv, Ukraine.

== Honours ==
- Soviet Top League winner: 1966, 1967, 1968, 1971.
- Soviet Cup winner: 1964, 1966.

== International career ==
Medvid made his debut for USSR on 23 October 1966 in a friendly against East Germany.

== See also ==
- Vyacheslav Medvid

== Notes and references ==
Notes:

a.	Russian: Фёдор Йожефович Медвидь. Ukrainian: Федір Йожефович Медвідь.
