= Mukachevo Raion =

Subdivision of Zakarpattia Oblast, Ukraine

Mukachevo Raion Мукачівський район
- Raion
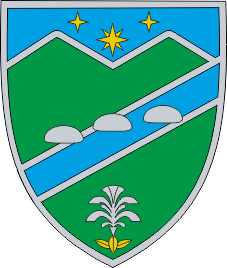
- Flag Coat of arms

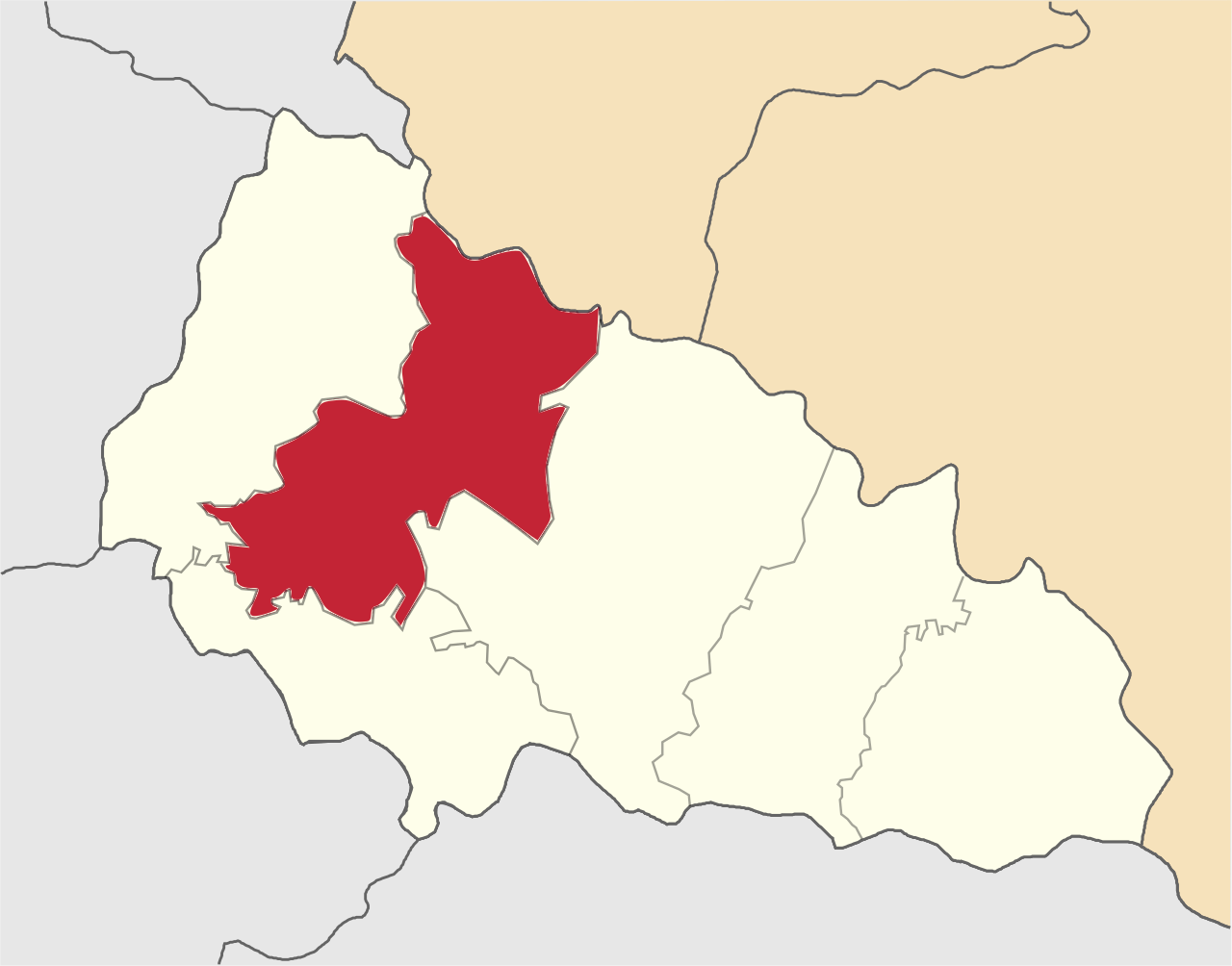
- Coordinates: 48°28′11.61″N 22°45′46.36″E
- Country: Ukraine
- Oblast: Zakarpattia Oblast
- Established: 9 November 1953
- Admin. center: Mukachevo
- Subdivisions: 13 hromadas

Government
  - Governor: Ivan Mihailo

Area
  - Total: 2,054 km^{2} (793 sq mi)

Population (2022)
  - Total: 251,145
  - Density: 122.3/km^{2} (316.7/sq mi)
- Time zone: UTC+02:00 (EET)
  - Summer (DST): UTC+03:00 (EEST)
- Postal index: 89620—89677
- Area code: +380-3131
- Website: mukachevo-rada.gov.ua

Mukachevo Raion (Ukrainian: Мукачівський район; Hungarian: Munkácsi járás) is a raion (district) of Zakarpattia Oblast (province) of Ukraine. Mukachevo is the administrative center of the raion. Its population is 251,145 (2022 estimate).

On 18 July 2020, as part of the administrative reform of Ukraine, the number of raions of Zakarpattia Oblast was reduced to six, and the area of Mukachevo Raion was significantly expanded. The January 2020 estimate of the raion population was 99,518 (2020 est.).

There are several alternative names used for this raion: Hungarian: Munkácsi járás, German: Rajon Mukatschewe, Russian: Мукачевский район, Slovak: Mukačevský rajón.

Residents in seven villages of the raion have the option to learn the Hungarian language in a school or home school environment.

== Urban-type settlements ==
Name	Ukrainian	Hungarian	Population
Kolchyno	Кольчино	Kölcsény	4,407
Chynadiiovo	Чинадійово	Szentmiklós	6,823

== Villages ==
Name	Ukrainian	Hungarian	Population
Babychi	Бабичі	Bábakút	962
Barbovo	Барбово	Bárdháza	948
Barkasovo	Баркасово	Barkaszó	2,236
Benedykivtsi	Бенедиківці	Benedeki	724
Berezynka	Березинка	Nyírhalom	624
Bobovyshche	Бобовище	Borhalom	1,612
Brestiv	Брестів	Ormód	355
Bukovynka	Буковинка	Beregbükkös	515
Bystrytsia	Бистриця	Repede	1,086
Chabyn	Чабин	Csabina	168
Chereyivtsi	Череївці	Cserház	258
Chervenovo	Червеньово	Cserlenő	1,951
Chomonyn	Чомонин	Csongor	2,265
Chopivtsi	Чопівці	Csapolc	434
Dertsen	Дерцен	Dercen	2,793
Dilok	Ділок	Beregpapfalva	332
Domboky	Домбоки	Dombokpuszta	493
Drahynia	Драгиня	Draginya	552
Dubyno	Дубино	Dubina	694
Fornosh	Форнош	Fornos	1,455
Handerovytsia	Гандеровиця	Klastromfalva	284
Hertsivtsi	Герцівці	Hegyrét	79
Horonda	Горонда	Gorond	4,000
Hrabovo	Грабово	Szidorfalva	146
Hrybivtsi	Грибівці	Gombás	548
Ilkivtsi	Ільківці	Ilkó	76
Ivanivtsi	Іванівці	Iványi	1,222
Kaidanovo	Кайданово	Kajdanó	1,224
Kalnyk	Кальник	Beregsárrét	872
Karpaty	Карпати	Beregvár	235
Kinlod	Кінлодь	Kinlód	223
Klenovets	Кленовець	Nyárasdomb	1,287
Kliucharky	Ключарки	Várkulcsa	2,632
Kliachanovo	Клячаново	Klacsanó	1,905
Klochky	Клочки	Lakatosfalva	300
Konoplivtsi	Коноплівці	Kendereske	595
Kopynivtsi	Копинівці	Nagymogyorós	803
Kosyno	Косино	Kockaszállás	1,026
Kryte	Крите	Fedelesfalva	346
Kuchava	Кучава	Németkucsova	293
Kushtanovytsia	Куштановиця	Kustánfalva	765
Kuzmyno	Кузьмино	Beregszilvás	216
Lavky	Лавки	Lóka	1,299
Lalovo	Лалово	Beregleányfalva	965
Letsovytsia	Лецовиця	Kislécfalva	825
Lisarnia	Лісарня	Erdőpatak	269
Lokhovo	Лохово	Beregszőllős	1,186
Makarovo	Макарьово	Makarja	1,753
Medvedivtsi	Медведівці	Fagyalos	470
Mykulivtsi	Микулівці	Kismogyorós	289
Nehrovo	Негрово	Maszárfalva	
Nove Davydkovo	Нове Давидково	Újdávidháza	4,006
Novoselytsia	Новоселиця	Kisrétfalu	267
Nyzhniy Koropets	Нижній Коропець	Alsókerepec	927
Obava	Обава	Dunkófalva	990
Pavshchyno	Павшино	Pósaháza	838
Pistrialovo	Пістрялово	Pisztraháza	773
Ploskanovytsia	Плоскановиця	Ploszkánfalva	254
Puzniakivtsi	Пузняківці	Szarvasrét	538
Rakoshyno	Ракошино	Beregrákos	3,280
Romochevytsia	Ромочевиця	Romocsafalva	560
Rostoviatytsia	Ростов'ятиця	Rosztovátovci	191
Ruska Kuchava	Руська Кучава	Oroszkucsova	89
Ruske	Руське	Orosztelek	916
Serne	Серне	Szernye	1,979
Shchaslyve	Щасливе	Szerencsfalva	316
Shenborn	Шенборн	Alsóschönborn	377
Shkurativtsi	Шкуратівці	Bereghalmos	113
Sofia	Софія	Zsófiafalva	386
Stanovo	Станово	Szánfalva	985
Stare Davydkovo	Старе Давидково	Ódávidháza	610
Strabychovo	Страбичово	Mezőterebes	3,386
Syniak	Синяк	Kékesfüred	200
Trostianytsia	Тростяниця	Nádaspatak	179
Velyki Luchky	Великі Лучки	Nagylucska	9,028
Verkhniy Koropets	Верхній Коропець	Felsőkerepec	1,362
Verkhnia Vyznytsia	Верхня Визниця	Felsőviznice	1,453
Vilkhovytsia	Вільховиця	Egercske	749
Vinkove	Вінкове	Vinkó	76
Yabluniv	Яблунів	Beregnagyalmás	637
Zhborivtsi	Жборівці	Runófalva	335
Zhniatyno	Жнятино	Izsnyéte	2,243
Zhukowo	Жуково	Zsukó	557
Zavydovo	Завидово	Dávidfalva	1,647
Zaluzhzhia	Залужжя	Beregkisalmás	1,268
Zniatsovo	Зняцьово	Ignéc	1,707
Zubivka	Зубівка	Beregfogaras	401
