= Zinaida Yermolyeva =

Russian microbiologist

- Зинаида Ермольева
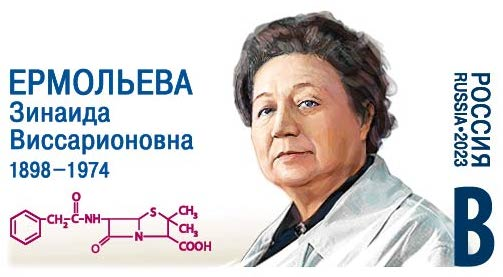
- Yermolyeva on a 2023 postcard of Russia
- Born: Zinaida Vissarionovna Yermolyeva; 24 October 1898; Frolovo, Don Host Oblast, Russian Empire
- Died: 2 December 1974 (aged 76); Moscow, Soviet Union
- Education: Southern Federal University
- Known for: Inventor of Penicillin in the Soviet Union
- Scientific career
- Fields: Microbiology, epidemiology

Zinaida Vissarionovna Yermolyeva (Russian: Зинаида Виссарионовна Ермольева; 24 October [O.S. 12 October] 1898 – 2 December 1974) was a Soviet microbiologist of Don Cossack origin most notable for producing penicillin for the Soviet military during World War II. She was a member of the USSR Academy of Medical Sciences at the time of her death.

== Career ==
In 1921, Yermolyeva graduated from the medical faculty of Donskoy University. From 1925 on, she acted as the head of several microbiology and epidemiology institutes in Moscow.

In 1925, Yermolyeva was appointed head of the Department of Microbial Biochemistry at the USSR Academy of Sciences. There, she began her research on bacteriophages and naturally occurring antimicrobial agents—lysozyme in particular. During the Second World War, she and Tamara Balezina isolated a penicillin-producing strain of Penicillium crustosum. It was first used in Soviet hospitals in 1943.

In 1942, she published the results of an experiment performed on herself, where she infected herself by drinking a solution of Vibrio cholerae and recovered after treatment. The results of her research were seen as essential in preventative measures against cholera in Russia's war efforts in the Eastern Front of World War II.

In 1947, Yermolyeva became the director of the newly formed Institute of Antibiotics of the USSR Ministry of Public Health. From 1952 until her death, she headed the Department of Microbiology of the Central Post-Graduate Medical Institute in Moscow (now the Russian Medical Academy of Postgraduate Education).

Yermolyeva was married to the microbiologist Lev Zilber, whose brother, the novelist Veniamin Kaverin used the career of Yermolyeva and her husband as a basis for a fictionalized account in his trilogy Open Book (1949–56). The "lively and realistic" depiction of Tatiana, the character based on Yermolyeva, popularized microbiology as a possible career among girls in the Soviet Union.

== Awards and recognition ==
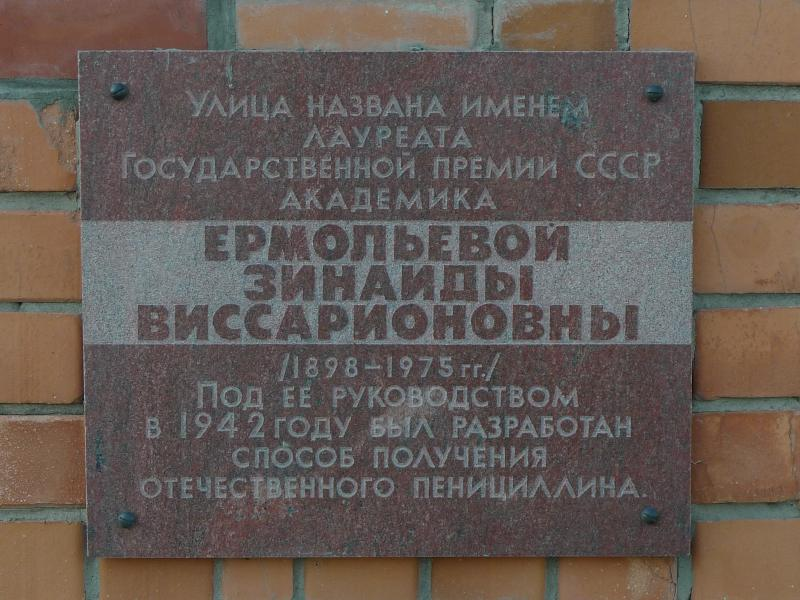
Memorial plaque to Yermolyeva in her birthplace of Frolovo, commemorating her as the recipient of the USSR State Prize

- Stalin Prize (1943)
- Two Orders of Lenin
- Order of the Red Banner of Labour

== Scientific interests ==
- Antibiotics
- Bacterial polysaccharides
- Biologically active substances from animal tissues
- Interferon
- Chemotherapy of infection

== Scientific writing ==
Ermolieva was the author of more than 500 papers, several books, such as "Penicillin", "Antibiotics, Bacterial Polysaccharides, Interferon" and others. She was the founder and chief editor of the Soviet journal "Antibiotiki" ("Antibiotics").

== Tribute ==
On 24 October 2018, Yermolyeva was celebrated with a Google Doodle for her achievements.
