= Kliucharky =

- Village
- Interactive map of Kliucharky
- Location within Zakarpattia Oblast Location within Ukraine
- Coordinates: 48°25′00″N 22°39′00″E
- Country: Ukraine
- Oblast: Zakarpattia Oblast
- Raion: Mukachevo Raion
- Hromada: Mukachevo urban hromada
- Elevation: 558 m (1,831 ft)

Population (2001)
  - Total: 2,632

Kliucharky (Ukrainian: Ключарки; Hungarian: Várkulcsa) is a village in Ukraine located about 4 miles south west of Mukacheve in Zakarpattia Oblast. Other spellings/names for Klyucharki are: Kluĉárky, Kljucsarki, Klyucharky, and Pavsino. In Yiddish, Kliucharky was referred to as Klicherkes. In 2001, its population was 2,632.

== History ==
The town was part of the Kingdom of Hungary (11th century - 1918 and 1938–1944) with the name of Várkulcsa in the Bereg megyé (county) and Munkácsi járás (district), next part of Czechoslovakia (1918–1938) with the name of Klucsárka in Podkarpatská Rus (Sub-Carpathia), then part of the Soviet Union (Ukraine) (1945–1991) with the name of Klyucharki and since 1991 known as Klyucharki in the Mukachevskiy (Mukachivs'kyy) rayon (district) and the Zakarpats'ka oblast (county) of Ukraine.

The first mention of the village is in 1773.

In March–April 1919, the village was part of the Hungarian Soviet Republic.

During the World War II, over 50 residents joined the Soviet Red Army.
