= Kuzmino, Melenkovsky District, Vladimir Oblast =

Kuzmino Кузьмино
- Village
- Location within Vladimir Oblast Location within Russia
- Coordinates: 55°31′N 41°26′E
- Country: Russia
- Region: Vladimir Oblast
- District: Melenkovsky District
- Time zone: UTC+3:00

Kuzmino (Russian: Кузьмино) is a rural locality (a village) in Butylitskoye Rural Settlement, Melenkovsky District, Vladimir Oblast, Russia. The population was 107 as of 2010. There are 2 streets.

== Geography ==
Kuzmino is located 28 km north of Melenki (the district's administrative centre) by road. Dobryatino is the nearest rural locality.
