= Lev Zilber =

Soviet microbiologist, virologist, immunologist and academician

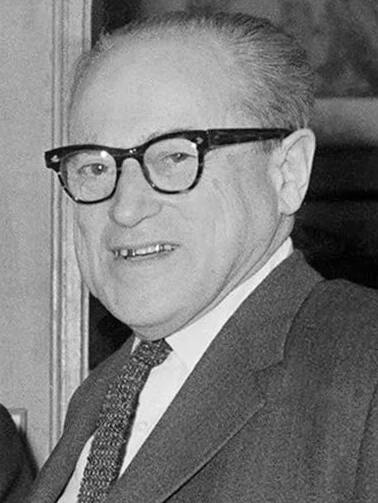
- Born: March 27, 1894; Medved village, Novgorod Governorate of the Russian Empire
- Died: November 10, 1966 (aged 72); Moscow, Soviet Union
- Resting place: Novodevichy Cemetery
- Education: First Moscow State Medical University
- Known for: researcher and discoverer of tick-borne encephalitis; one of the creators of the theory of the viral nature of cancer
- Spouse: Zinaida Yermolyeva Valeria Kiseleva
- Children: Lev Kiselev Fedor Kiselev
- Awards: Order of Lenin, Order of the Red Banner of Labour, Medal "For Merit to Science and Humanity" of the Czech Academy of Sciences, Medal of the Czechoslovak Medical Society named after Jan Purkyně
- Scientific career
- Workplaces: USSR Academy of Medical Sciences
- Notable students: Shubladze, Antonina

Lev Aleksandrovich Zilber (Russian: Лев Александрович Зильбер; March 27 [O.S. March 15], 1894 – November 10, 1966) was a Soviet micro-biologist whose work focused on virology and immunology. He was an academician of the USSR Academy of Medical Sciences (AMN SSSR; 1945) and the founder of the Soviet school of virology. His younger brother was the famous writer Veniamin Kaverin.

== Biography ==
Zilber was born on March 15 [O.S. March 27] 1894 in the family of the kapellmeister Abel Zilber and his wife, née Khana Girshevna (Anna Grigorievna) Desson, a pianist and owner of music stores. He was born in the village of Medved, Medved volost, Novgorod Governorate. His sister Leya (married Elena Aleksandrovna Tynyanova, 1892–1944) is the wife of the writer and literary critic Yury Tynyanov, his classmate. He was the elder brother of military doctor David Zilber (1897–1967), composer and conductor Alexander Ruchiov (1899–1970) and writer Veniamin Kaverin (1902–1989).

=== Career ===
In 1912, Zilber graduated from the Pskov provincial gymnasium with a silver medal and entered the natural department of the Faculty of physics and mathematics of St. Petersburg Imperial University. In 1915 he transferred to the medical faculty of Moscow University, having received permission to attend classes at the natural department at the same time and graduated in 1919.

Having left in 1919 as a volunteer for the Bolsheviks, he served in the Red Army in various positions from a doctor to the head of the medical unit. He was taken as a prisoner by the anti-communist whites, but he successfully escaped. Since 1921, he worked at the Institute of microbiology of the People's Commissariat for Health in Moscow.

In 1928 he married Zinaida Yermolyeva. After the wedding, Zilber and Yermolyeva worked at the Pasteur Institute in France and the Robert Koch Institute in Germany. In 1929, he was sent by the People's Commissar for Health N. Semashko to suppress an outbreak of typhoid fever in the city of Dzerzhinsk near Nizhny Novgorod.

=== First arrests ===
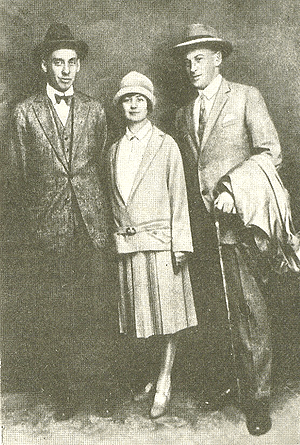
At the congress in Berlin 1927. From left to right – Vladimir Engelhardt, Zinaida Yermolyeva and Lev Zilber

In 1929, he accepted an offer to take the position of director of the Azerbaijan Institute of microbiology and head of the department of microbiology at the Medical University in Baku. He led the suppression of an outbreak of plague in the villages of Bulutan and Hadrut in Nagorno-Karabakh in 1930. Upon his return to Baku, he was introduced to the Order of the Red Banner, but was soon arrested on charges of sabotage to infect the population of Azerbaijan with plague. He was released after 4 months of incarceration (possibly, at the request of Maxim Gorky who was approached by Veniamin Kaverin, his younger brother). Upon his release, Zilber worked in Moscow heading the department of microbiology at the Central Institute for the Improvement of Doctors while also heading the microbiological department of the State Scientific and Control Institute of the People's Commissariat for Health of the RSFSR named after Lev Tarasevich.

In 1932, he led the efforts in eliminating an outbreak of smallpox in the Kazakh Soviet Socialist Republic and in 1935 he also married Valeria Petrovna Kiseleva.

In 1935–1936 he played a fundamental role in the creation of the Central Virus Laboratory under the People's Commissariat for Health of the RSFSR and the opening of a department of virology at the Institute of Microbiology of the USSR Academy of Sciences.

In 1937, he led the Far Eastern expedition of the People's Commissariat for Health of the USSR to study an unknown infectious disease of the central nervous system. During the expedition the nature of the disease – tick-borne encephalitis was clarified and methods of dealing with it were proposed.

Immediately upon his return, he was arrested on accusations of an attempt to infect Moscow with encephalitis and the concealment of the fact that encephalitis was brought into the USSR by Japanese saboteurs. In June 1939 he was released, having received support from Veniamin Kaverin, Zinaida Ermolyeva, A. K. Shubladze, Mikhail Chumakov, V. D. Solovyov and many others.

In 1939, he became the head of the virology department at the Gamaleya Research Institute of Epidemiology, which he led until his death in 1966.

=== Third arrest ===
In 1940 Zilber was arrested for the third time. While imprisoned, he served part of his term in camps on the Pechora river, where he developed a drug against pellagra, which he termed Antipellagrin. For this, he cultivated yeast using reindeer moss, which saved the lives of hundreds of prisoners who would have died from vitamin deficiency. He received a copyright certificate for his invention, the certificate was recorded in the name of the "NKVD". He refused repeated offers to work on bacteriological weapons and other biological warfare strategies. Remembering Zilber's ability to extract alcohol from reindeer moss, the authorities sent him to a "sharashka", where he commenced research on carcinoma. The prisoners brought mice and rats for Zilber's experiments. In the course of research, he formulated a new concept of the origin of cancerous tumors.

=== After release ===
In March 1944, on the eve of Zilber's 50th birthday, he was released thanks to a letter of innocence addressed to Joseph Stalin and signed by the chief surgeon of the Red Army Nikolay Burdenko, the Vice President of the USSR Academy of sciences Leon Orbeli, academician Nikolay Gamaleya, biochemist Vladimir Engelgardt and Zinaida Yermolyeva (the creator of Soviet penicillin and Zilber's ex-wife), who was the initiator of the appeal along with his other colleagues and students.

In the summer of 1945, he found and took his family to the USSR – his wife, his wife's sister and two sons who survived in German work camps for 3.5 years. In the same year, he was elected an academician of the newly created USSR Academy of Medical Sciences and appointed scientific director of the Institute of virology of the USSR Academy of Medical Sciences. He also headed the Department of virology and tumor immunology of the Institute of epidemiology, microbiology and infectious diseases of the USSR Academy of Medical Sciences, where he worked over the next few years.

During the latter half of the 1940s, he was occupied formulating a viral theory for the origin of cancer. Zilber received the Stalin Prize of the USSR in 1946; in 1967 he was posthumously awarded the State Prize of the USSR for discovering the pathogenicity of the virus of fowl Rous sarcoma of animals (cycle of works, 1957–66). He was awarded the Order of Lenin, the Order of the Red Banner of Labor and various celebratory medals.

In 1958 he participated in the 7th International Cancer Congress in London. In 1959–1965 he participated in the WHO working group on cancer. He would also attend international symposiums and conferences on oncology in cities like Berlin, Libice nad Cidlinou, London, Bratislava, Warsaw, Turin, and Prague. In 1965 he was an organizer and participant of the International Symposium on Cancer Immunology in Sukhumi, Abkhazia. On November 10, 1966, Lev Zilber suddenly died in his office at the Gamaleya Research Institute and was buried at the Novodevichy Cemetery, Moscow.

== Family ==
Zilber's two sons became famous biologists in their own right; Lev Lvovich Kiselev (1936–2008), an academician of the Russian Academy of Sciences and Fedor Lvovich Kiselev, an oncologist and member of the Russian Academy of Medical Sciences. Two of his brothers attained prominence in the USSR; David Alexandrovich Zilber was a hygienist who headed national departments of hygiene and wrote several leading textbooks on the subject; and Veniamin Kaverin, a famous writer and screenwriter.

Zilber married twice in his lifetime. His first wife was the renowned Soviet microbiologist Zinaida Yermolyeva who independently discovered penicillin. He then married Valeria Petrovna Kiseleva in 1935. His brother-in-law was Evgeny Schwartz, a playwright.

== Scientific Accomplishments ==
Lev Zilber is the author of the scientific discovery "New properties of the pathogenicity of tumor viruses", which is listed in the State Register of Discoveries of the USSR. In 1967, for the discovery of the pathogenicity of the Rous sarcoma virus in non-fowl animals he was posthumously awarded the State Prize of the USSR. His patented treatment for pellagra, Antipellagrin was vital in treating vitamin deficiencies in the USSR. His scientific research on oncology, carcinogenesis, immunology, and microbiology was widely published and cited by both native and foreign scientists. Lev Zilber was well-respected in scientific circles for his distinguished career and findings despite facing several personal as well as institutional struggles.

He is also the author of more than 300 scientific articles published in domestic and foreign journals, as well as popular science articles and essays. He was a member of the associations of oncologists of US, France and Belgium, member of the Royal Society of Medicine, honorary member of the New York Academy of Sciences, organizer and chairman of the committee on virology and cancer immunology at the Union for International Cancer Control, and a designated WHO expert in immunology as well as virology.

== Awards ==
- Medal "For Merit to Science and Humanity" of the Czech Academy of Sciences.
- Medal of the Czechoslovak Medical Society named after Jan Purkyně.
- The order of Lenin.
- The order of the Red Banner of Labour.

== Bibliography ==
- "Paraimmunity". M. 1928
- "Immunity". M.4 l. 1937. Jointly with V. A. Lyubarsky
- "Epidemic encephalitis". M. 1945.
- "Viral theory of the origin of malignant tumors". M. 1946.
- Fundamentals of immunity. M.1948.
- "Teaching about viruses: (General virology)". M.1956.
- "Fundamentals of immunology" M. 1958.
- "Bazel immunology. Bucuresti". 1959. In Romanian.
- "Virology and Immunology of cancer". M., 1962. Jointly. with G. I. Abelev.

=== Posthumous publications ===
- "Virus-genetic theory of the origin of tumors". M., Science, 1968.
- "The virology and immunology of cancer". L., 1968. With G.I. Abelev.
- "Selected Works: Bacteria, Viruses, Cancer, Immunity". L., from Medicine, 1971.
- "Evolution of the virus-genetic theory of tumors". M., Science, 1975. Jointly with I.S. Irlin and F. L. Kiselev.

== Sources ==
- Kiselev, L. and Levina E. S. Lev Aleksandrovich Zilber (1894–1966): life in science. Science, 2004. — 698 p. (Scientific and biographical literature). ISBN 5-02-032751-4.
