= Kuzmino, Cherepovetsky District, Vologda Oblast =

Kuzmino Кузьмино
- Village
- Location within Vologda Oblast Location within Russia
- Coordinates: 58°54′N 38°11′E
- Country: Russia
- Region: Vologda Oblast
- District: Cherepovetsky District
- Time zone: UTC+3:00

Kuzmino (Russian: Кузьмино) is a rural locality (a village) in Myaksinskoye Rural Settlement, Cherepovetsky District, Vologda Oblast, Russia. The population was 1 as of 2002.

== Geography ==
Kuzmino is located 35 km (22 mi) southeast of Cherepovets (the district's administrative centre) by road. Grigorevo is the nearest rural locality.
