= Tamara Iosifovna Balezina =

Russian microbiologist

Balezina Tamara Iosifovna
- Балезина Тамара Иосифовна
- Born: April 28, 1913; Starobilsk, Kharkov Governorate, Russian Empire
- Died: August 11, 2010 (aged 97)
- Known for: Virology, Biology

Tamara Iosifovna Balezina (28 April 1913 – 11 August 2010) was a Soviet Union-Russian microbiologist who played a key role in the discovery and production of penicillin in the Soviet Union.

== Early life and education ==
Balezina was born in 1913 in Starobilsk, Kharkov Governorate, into a family of physicians. She attended a seven-year medical program starting in 1929 at the Stalin Medical Institute, but she moved to the Kuibyshev Medical Institute after two years in 1931. She graduated with honors from the sanitary and hygienic faculty of the Kuibyshev Medical Institute in 1935. She began postgraduate studies in microbiology in 1936, and transferred to the graduate school of V.I.E.M. (Institute of Experimental Medicine) in Moscow to follow her husband.

On 7 June 1944, she defended her Ph.D. thesis on "Derivation, research and clinical applications of penicillin".

== Career ==
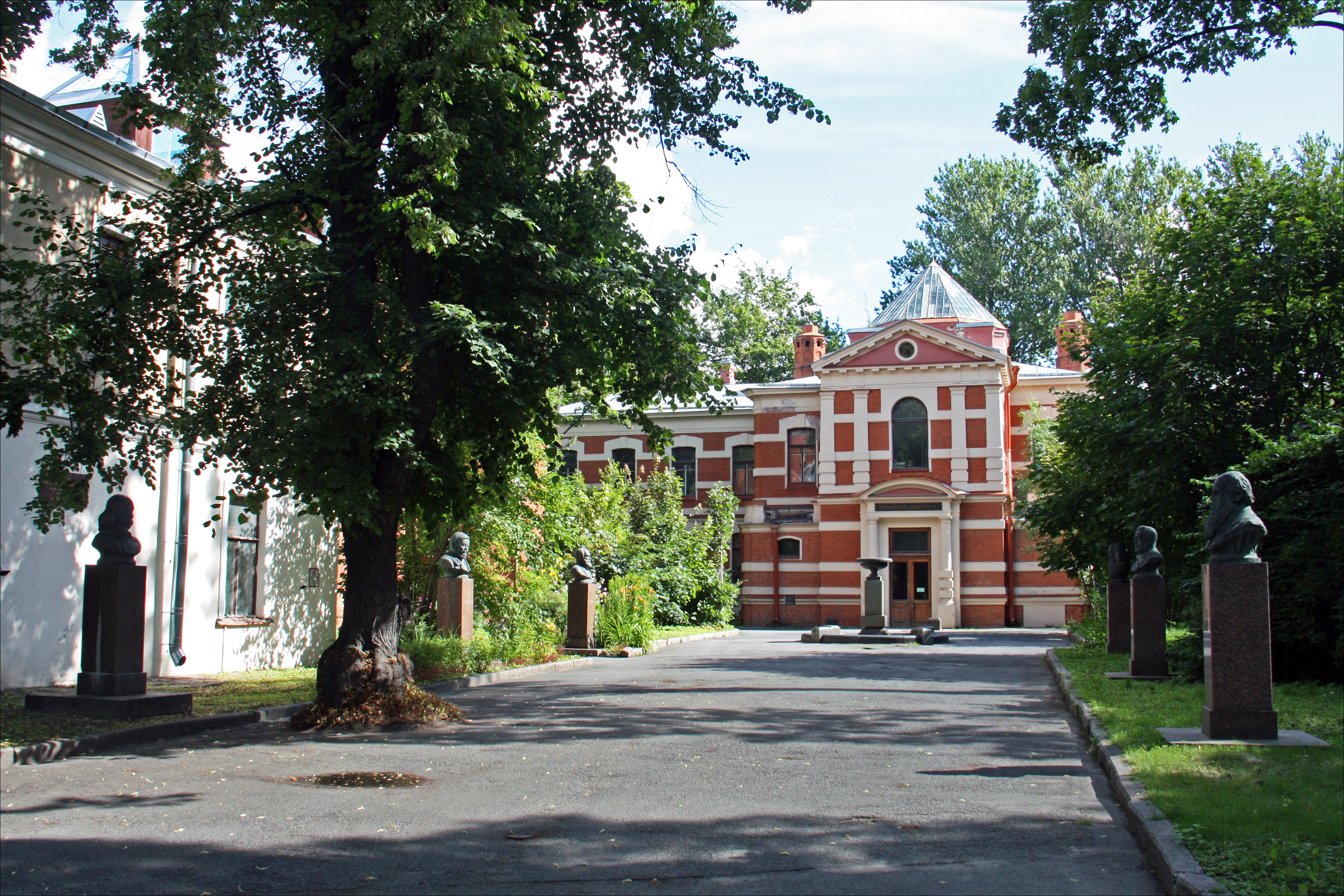
Institute of Experimental Medicine's Chemical Laboratory

In 1942 she was tasked with organizing a laboratory to conduct research on penicillin in 1942 and she was the one responsible for the hands-on work while Zinaida Yermolyeva organized the Laboratory of Biochemical Microbes. Balezina began to collect fungus in the area around the laboratory and was able to find a fungus that provided antibiotic capacity but was less effective than the strains from Alexander Fleming. Subsequent work led her to investigate molds from potatoes, and in the 93rd iteration of cultures she identified a strain that was similar to Penicillium crustosum with higher activity than Fleming's strain of Penicillium. By 1944, the resulting drug was available for use in the war. According to Balezina, while she was working on the isolation of Penicillium strains, Yermolyeva was working on a cholera outbreak, yet Yermolyeva received more credit for the penicillin research.

From 1950s she worked on the methods of interferon production and the formation of interferon in cells. In 1972 she patented a method of interferon production in animal cell cultures using plant viruses as interferon inductors.

From 1945 to 1952, she was a senior researcher at the All-Union Research Institute of Penicillin and Other Antibiotics and the Institute of Epidemiology and Microbiology. From 1955 to 1956, she worked at the CIU doctors, and from 1956 to 1975, at the Institute of Virology. She retired and worked as a volunteer as reception in the health room at the P.R.U.E. (Plekhanov Russian University of Economics, formerly known as the Karl Marx Moscow Institute of the National Economy).

== Personal life ==
Balezina lived in Moscow until her death on August 11, 2010, at the age of 97.

== Awards ==
- Medal "In Commemoration of the 850th Anniversary of Moscow"
- Jubilee Medal "50 Years of Victory in the Great Patriotic War 1941–1945"
- Jubilee Medal "60 Years of Victory in the Great Patriotic War 1941–1945"
- Jubilee Medal "65 Years of Victory in the Great Patriotic War 1941–1945"
- Medal "Veteran of Labor"
- Medal "For Valiant Labor in the Great Patriotic War 1941–1945"

== Published literature ==
- Baleznina (1998). "K istorii polucheniia Z.V.Y. Yermol'evoi penitsillina". Antibiotiki I Khimoterapiia. 43 (5): 7–8.
- Balezina, T I; Fadeeva, L L; Zemskov, V M; Korneeva, L E; Loĭdina, G I (1976-03-01). "[Interferonogenic and antiviral activity of the tobacco mosaic virus, tilorone and sodium nucleinate]". Antibiotiki. 21 (3): 250–254. ISSN 0003-5637. PMID 818948.
- Balezina, T I; Korneeva, L E; Zemskov, V M; Loidina, G I; Nikolaeva, O V; Fainshtein, S L; Fadeeva, L L; Eromolieva, Z V (1977-07-01). "Comparison of interferon-inducing activities and antiviral effects of tobacco mosaic virus, tilorone and sodium nucleinate". Acta Virologica. 21 (4): 338–343. ISSN 1336-2305. PMID 20769.
- Yermolyeva Z.V., Korneeva L.E., Balezina T.I. et al. Tyloron as interferon inductor – Antibiotics, 1973, Vol. 18, No.6, p. 517-520.
- Yermolyeva Z.V. Balezina T.I. Penicillin-crustozin VIEM, // Journal of microbiology, epidemiology and immunology. – 1944. — No. 5.
- Yermolyeva Z.V. Balezina T.I., Marshak A.M. Penicillin and its clinical applications // Clinical medicine. — 1944. — Т. 22, No. 3.
