= Marina Voroshilova =

Soviet microbiologist, virologist

Marina Konstantinovna Voroshilova
- Born: 16 March 1922; Simferopol
- Died: 19 November 1986 (aged 64); Aprelevka, Moscow Oblast, Russia
- Citizenship: Soviet Union
- Education: I.M. Sechenov First Moscow State Medical University
- Known for: Clinical trial of Oral Polio Vaccine; Discovery of non-specific effects of Oral Poliovirus Vaccine (OPV); The concept beneficial human viruses
- Scientific career
- Fields: Virology, Immunology
- Workplaces: D.I.Ivanovsky Institute of Virology, Moscow, USSR; M.P.Chumakov Institute of Poliomyelitis and Viral Encephalitides
- Doctoral advisor: Mikhail Chumakov

Marina Konstantinovna Voroshilova (Russian: Мар′ина Констант′иновна Ворош′илова) (March 16, 1922 – November 19, 1986) was a Soviet virologist and corresponding member of the Academy of Medical Sciences of the USSR (1969). She is best known for her work on the introduction of vaccines against poliomyelitis, the discovery of non-specific effects of oral poliovirus vaccine (OPV), and developing the concept of beneficial human viruses.

== Biography ==
Voroshilova was born on March 16, 1922, in Simferopol in the family of attorney at law Konstantin Konstantinovich Voroshilov, a politician of the White Movement of Crimea, who was the Chairman of the Council of People's Representatives in 1917-1918. After the Bolsheviks took power in the Crimea, the family was forced to hide and moved to Kazan, where Voroshilov was well known as the son of the founder of the Department of Physiology, Rector of the Kazan Imperial University Konstantin Vasilievich Voroshilov. After the death of her father in 1929, Marina and her mother moved to Moscow, where she graduated from the First Moscow Medical Institute in 1944 (later transformed into I.M. Sechenov First Moscow State Medical University. At the end of 1940s she started to work as a clinician and epidemiologist investigating outbreaks of poliomyelitis in Soviet Union and in the Russian-occupied parts of Germany, where she isolated new strains of poliovirus and other enteroviruses, including viral strains that resulted in diseases similar to polio when introduced to monkey. Voroshilova also worked to move medicine in the Russia away from theories enforced by Stalin-supported scientists such as Trofim Lysenko.

In 1955, she began to work at the newly created Institute for the Poliomyelitis Research (later renamed as M.P.Chumakov Institute of Poliomyelitis and Viral Encephalitides). She was the head of laboratory at the Institute and worked to develop prophylactic vaccines against the disease. In 1958-1959, together with Mikhail Chumakov, she organized the world's first mass production and clinical trials of a live polio vaccine made from attenuated Sabin strains. The collaboration between scientists in the US and the USSR collaboration led to visits between the two countries which were tracked in the United States by the Federal Bureau of Investigation. The visits between the United States and Russia were also covered in the media. While developing the vaccines, she first tested them on herself, her husband, and her children.

In 1960-1970, Voroshilova discovered non-specific protective effects against diseases caused by unrelated viruses. She had been studying human enteroviruses, the vast majority of which are non-pathogenic and cause asymptomatic infection and determined that they could have beneficial properties for human health. Based on this concept of beneficial viruses, Voroshilova developed a series of live attenuated enterovirus vaccines that were used along with polio vaccine for non-specific prevention of influenza. She established the possibility of viral oncolysis of tumor cells by non-pathogenic enteroviruses and conducted studies of the possibility of treating cancer with live enterovirus vaccines, based on the stimulation of innate immunity. After her death, the State Committee of the Council of Ministers of the USSR for Inventions and Discoveries issued a diploma certifying this discovery. During the COVID-19 pandemic, researchers revisited Voroshilova's research on the use of live vaccines for polio as protection against other viruses such as influenza because of the possibility that this would lead to protection against COVID-19.

Voroshilova died on November 19, 1987.

== Selected publications ==
- Voroshilova, M. K. (1989). "Potential use of nonpathogenic enteroviruses for control of human disease". Progress in Medical Virology. 36: 191–202. ISSN 0079-645X. PMID 2555836.
- Chumakov, M. P.; Voroshilova, M. K.; Drozdov, S. G.; Dzagurov, S. G.; Lashkevich, V. A.; Mironova, L. L.; Ralph, N. M.; Gagarina, A. V.; Ashmarina, E. E.; Shirman, G. A.; Fleer, G. P. (1961). "Some results of the work on mass immunization in the Soviet Union with live poliovirus vaccine prepared from Sabin strains". Bulletin of the World Health Organization. 25 (1): 79–91. ISSN 0042-9686. PMC 2555546. PMID 13879389.
- Koroleva, Galina A.; Lashkevich, V. A.; Voroshilova, Marina K. (1977). "Differences in multiplication of virulent and vaccine strains of poliovirus type I, II, and III in laboratory animals". Archives of Virology. 54 (1–2): 29–39. doi:10.1007/BF01314376. ISSN 0304-8608. PMID 196575. S2CID 22730624.
- Voroshilova, Marina Konstantinovna (1966). Immunologiia, epidemiologiia i profilaktika poliomielita i skhodnykh s nim zabolevanii (in Russian). Moskva: Meditsina. OCLC 14486349.
- Vorosilova, Marina Konstantinovna; Zevandrova, Vera Ivanovna; Taranova, G. P (1965). Further study of the immunologie status and the resistance of the alimentary tract in children, Moscow 1963. Warszawa: s.n. OCLC 838324617.

== Awards and honors ==
In 1969 she was named a corresponding member of the USSR Academy of Medical Sciences.

== Personal life ==
As an eleven-year old child, Voroshilova had diphtheria and her mother's colleague, the virologist Mikhail Chumakov, helped her recover. She met Chumakov again during World War Two and he then invited her to work with him at the Institute of Experimental Medicine. She joined the lab and they later married. One of Voroshilova's children, Konstantin Chumakov, is the associate director of research at the United States' Food and Drug Administration in the office of vaccines research and review.
