= Kuzmino, Kochyovsky District, Perm Krai =

Kuzmino Кузьмино
- Village
- Location within Perm Krai Location within Russia
- Coordinates: 59°42′N 54°20′E
- Country: Russia
- Region: Perm Krai
- District: Kochyovsky District
- Time zone: UTC+5:00

Kuzmyno (Russian: Кузьмино) is a rural locality (a village) in Pelymskoye Rural Settlement, Kochyovsky District, Perm Krai, Russia. The population was 144 as of 2010. There are 5 streets.

== Geography ==
Kuzmino is located 12 km north of Kochyovo (the district's administrative centre) by road. Petukhovo is the nearest rural locality.
