= Bukovynka, Zakarpattia Oblast =

Bukovynka Буковинка
- Village
- Location in Ukraine Bukovynka (Ukraine)
- Coordinates: 48°27′10″N 22°49′15″E
- Country: Ukraine
- Oblast: Zakarpattia Oblast
- Raion: Mukachevo Raion
- Elevation: 231 m (758 ft)

Population (2001)
  - Total: 515
- Time zone: UTC+2 (EET)
  - Summer (DST): UTC+3 (EEST)
- Postal code: 89660
- Area code: +380 3131

Bukovynka (Ukrainian: Буковинка) is a village (selo) in Mukachevo Raion, Zakarpattia Oblast, in western Ukraine. It belongs to Verkhni Koropets rural hromada, one of the hromadas of Ukraine.

== Demographics ==
According to the 2001 Ukrainian census, 515 people lived in the village.

=== Languages ===
According to the 2001 census, the primary languages of the inhabitants of Bukovynka were:

Language	Percentage
Ukrainian	98.25 %
German	0.78 %
Russian	0.58 %
Hungarian	0.19 %
Others	0.20 %
