= Kuzmino, Rodnikovsky District, Ivanovo Oblast =

Kuzmino Кузьмино
- Village
- Location within Ivanovo Oblast Location within Russia
- Coordinates: 57°00′N 41°49′E
- Country: Russia
- Region: Ivanovo Oblast
- District: Rodnikovsky District
- Time zone: UTC+3:00

Kuzmino (Russian: Кузьмино) is a rural locality (a village) in Rodnikovsky District, Ivanovo Oblast, Russia. Population: 13 (2010 census);

== Geography ==
This rural locality is located 13 kilometres (8.1 mi) from Rodniki (the district's administrative centre), 52 kilometres (32 mi) from Ivanovo (capital of Ivanovo Oblast) and 290 kilometres (180 mi) from Moscow. Nikonikha is the nearest rural locality.
