= Stare Davydkovo =

Coordinates: 48°27′N 22°38′E

Stare Davydkovo (Ukrainian: Стáре Давидкóво, Russian: Стáрое Давыдкóво, Hungarian: Ódávidháza) is a small farming village in the suburbs of Mukachevo (Munkács) in Zakarpattia Oblast, Ukraine. Historically, it was part of the Kingdom of Hungary from the 11th century until 1918, when it was called Ó-Dávidháza. The administrative district center was in the nearby village of Palanok and all events of birth, marriage and death were recorded there.

It was located in Bereg megyé (county) and Munkácsi járás (district). It then became part of Czechoslovakia (1918–1938) when the region was referred to as Podkarpatská Rus (Sub-Carpathia), and called Stare Davidkovo. The region reverted to Hungary during World War II, and was then annexed to the Soviet Union in 1945 until Ukrainian independence in 1991. Today, it is part of Mukachevskiy (Mukachivs'kyy) rayon (district) and the Zakarpats'ka oblast (county) of Ukraine.

Other spellings/names for Stare Davydkovo are: Staroye Davidkovo, Stare Davydkove, Davikova Sztaroje, Sztaroje Davidovo. In Yiddish, Stare Davydkovo was referred to as Kleina Davidkif.

Stare Davydkovo was and still remains a small village of only a couple streets, bordering the road from Mukacheve to Uzhhorod, about 4 miles W of Mukacheve.
