= Nehrovo =

Coordinates: 48°22′17″N 22°54′34″E

Nehrovo (Ukrainian: Негрово; Hungarian: Maszárfalva; Slovak: Negrovo; Yiddish: נעגראָוואָ, romanized: Negrovo) is a village in Mukachevo Raion, Zakarpattia Oblast, Ukraine. It is 11 miles southeast of Mukachevo, which is the nearest town with a substantial population. It is located in the Mukachevo Raion, but formerly administered under Irshava Raion.

Prior to 1918, the town was known as Maszarfalva, and was part of the Austro-Hungarian Empire. Between 1918 and 1938, the town belonged to Czechoslovakia, and was named Negrovo. Proceeding the creation of the Soviet Union, the town was acquired as a territory of the Ukrainian Soviet Socialist Republic, and was created as Nehrovo, as it is known to this day, even after the dissolution of the Soviet Union.

== Demographics ==
Jews constituted a majority of the population of Nehrovo throughout most of history. In 1880, the Jewish population of the town was tabulated as 104, and in 1921, the community was registered as 168. The rest of Nehrovo's residents consisted largely of Hungarians, Slovaks, and Ukrainians, relative to the country which it belonged to.

As was the fate of so many Carpathian Jews, most of Negrovo's Jewish population was decimated, the majority being deported to Auschwitz.
