= Zaluzhzhia =

Zaluzhzhia (Ukrainian: Залужжя) is a name of several populated places in Ukraine:

- Zaluzhzhia, Berezhany urban hromada, Ternopil Raion, Ternopil Oblast
- Zaluzhzhia, Dubno Raion, Rivne Oblast
- Zaluzhzhia, Ivano-Frankivsk Oblast
- Zaluzhzhia, Khmelnytskyi Oblast
- Zaluzhzhia, Kremenets Raion, Ternopil Oblast
- Zaluzhzhia, Lviv Raion, Lviv Oblast
- Zaluzhzhia, Sarny Raion, Rivne Oblast
- Zaluzhzhia, Vinnytsia Oblast
- Zaluzhzhia, Volyn Oblast
- Zaluzhzhia, Yavoriv Raion, Lviv Oblast
- Zaluzhzhia, Zakarpattia Oblast
- Zaluzhzhia, Zbarazh urban hromada, Ternopil Raion, Ternopil Oblast
