= Kuzmino, Kichmengsko-Gorodetsky District, Vologda Oblast =

Kuzmino Кузьмино
- Village
- Location within Vologda Oblast Location within Russia
- Coordinates: 60°03′N 45°43′E
- Country: Russia
- Region: Vologda Oblast
- District: Kichmengsko-Gorodetsky District
- Time zone: UTC+3:00

Kuzmino (Russian: Кузьмино) is a rural locality (a village) in Kichmengskoye Rural Settlement, Kichmengsko-Gorodetsky District, Vologda Oblast, Russia. The population was 30 as of 2002.

== Geography ==
Kuzmino is located 9 km northwest of Kichmengsky Gorodok (the district's administrative centre) by road. Sudnicheskaya Gora is the nearest rural locality.

== Paleontology ==
A temnospondyl Tupilakosaurus sp. was found in the Lower Triassic (Lower Induan) deposits of Kuzmino.
