= Kuzmino, Vyaznikovsky District, Vladimir Oblast =

Kuzmino Кузьмино
- Village
- Location within Vladimir Oblast Location within Russia
- Coordinates: 56°09′N 42°15′E
- Country: Russia
- Region: Vladimir Oblast
- District: Vyaznikovsky District
- Time zone: UTC+3:00

Kuzmino (Russian: Кузьмино) is a rural locality (a village) in Gorod Vyazniki, Vyaznikovsky District, Vladimir Oblast, Russia. The population was 3 as of 2010.

== Geography ==
Kuzmino is located on the Shumar River, 20 km southeast of Vyazniki (the district's administrative centre) by road. Smenki is the nearest rural locality.
