= Kuzmino, Sobinsky District, Vladimir Oblast =

Kuzmino Кузьмино
- Village
- Location within Vladimir Oblast Location within Russia
- Coordinates: 56°01′N 40°05′E
- Country: Russia
- Region: Vladimir Oblast
- District: Sobinsky District
- Time zone: UTC+3:00

Kuzmino (Russian: Кузьмино) is a rural locality (a village) in Vorshinskoye Rural Settlement, Sobinsky District, Vladimir Oblast, Russia. The population was 83 as of 2010. There are 2 streets.

== Geography ==
Kuzmino is located on the Vorsha River, 12 km northeast of Sobinka (the district's administrative centre) by road. Yelkhovitsa is the nearest rural locality.
