= Kuzmyno =

Coordinates: 48°32′29″N 22°34′07″E

Kuzmyno (Ukrainian: Кузьмино, translit. Kuz'myno), also referred to as Kalnik, Kuzmics, Kuzmino, Kuzmina, Kuz'myno, or in Hungarian: Beregszilvás, is a village located in the Mukacheve Raion (district) in the Zakarpattia Oblast (province) in western Ukraine.

It has a population of 216.

Kuzmyno contains a 19th century Jewish cemetery dating back to 1851.
