= Medved (rural locality) =

Medved (Russian: Медведь) is the name of several rural localities in Novgorod Oblast, Russia:

- Medved, Malovishersky District, Novgorod Oblast, a village in Burginskoye Settlement of Malovishersky District
- Medved, Shimsky District, Novgorod Oblast, a selo in Medvedskoye Settlement of Shimsky District
