= Yevgeny Pavlovsky =

Soviet scientist (1884–1965)

Yevgeny Nikanorovich Pavlovsky Евге́ний Никано́рович Павло́вский
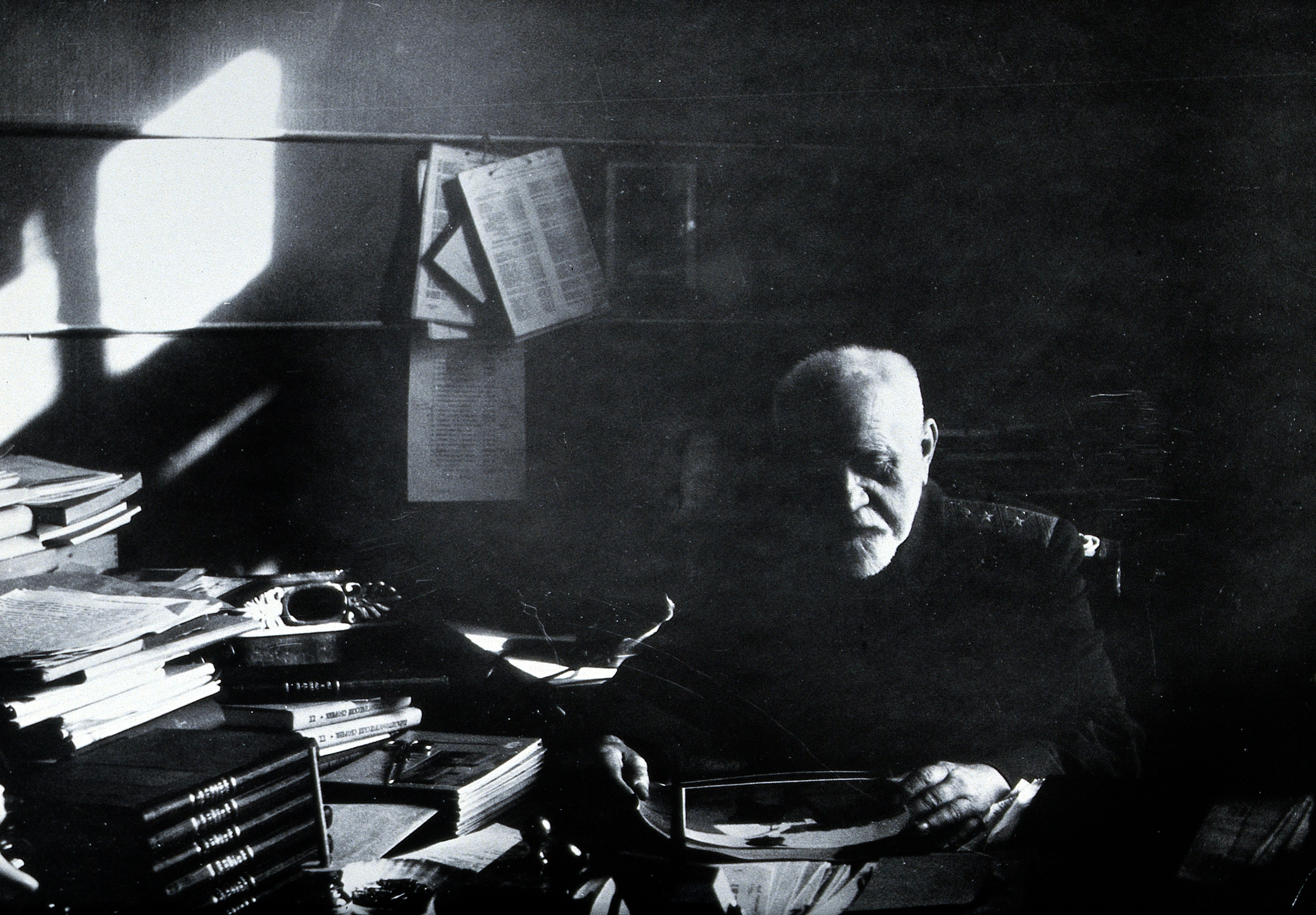
- Pavlovsky by LJ Bruce-Chwatt from the Wellcome Collection
- Born: 5 March 1884; Biryuch, Russia
- Died: 27 May 1965 (aged 81); Leningrad
- Education: St. Petersburg Academy
- Known for: Natural nidality of human diseases
- Awards: Order of the Red Star (1936); Stalin Prizes (1941, 1950); Orders of Lenin (1944, 1945, 1945, 1954, 1961, 1964); Darwin–Wallace Medal (1958); Lenin Prize (1965)
- Scientific career
- Fields: Zoology, entomology
- Workplaces: Academy of Sciences of the Soviet Union, Tajik Academy of Sciences, Red Army Medical Service

Yevgeny Nikanorovich Pavlovsky (Russian: Евге́ний Никано́рович Павло́вский; 5 March 1884, Biryuch – 27 May 1965, Leningrad) was a Soviet zoologist, entomologist, academician of the Academy of Sciences of the Soviet Union (1939), the Academy of Medical Sciences of the USSR (1944), honorary member of the Tajik Academy of Sciences (1951), and a lieutenant general of the Red Army Medical Service in World War II.

== Career ==
In 1908, Yevgeny Pavlovsky graduated from the St. Petersburg Academy in Biology. He became a professor at his alma mater in 1921. In 1933–1944, he worked at the All-union Institute of Experimental Medicine in Leningrad and simultaneously at the Tajik branch of the Academy of Sciences of the Soviet Union (1937–1951). Pavlovsky held the post of the director of the Zoology Institute of the Academy of Sciences of the Soviet Union in 1942–1962. In 1946, he was appointed head of the Department of Parasitology & Medical Zoology at the Institute of Epidemiology & Microbiology of the Soviet Academy of Medical Sciences. Yevgeny Pavlovsky was the president of the Soviet Geographical Society in 1952–1964. Under Pavlovsky's direction, they organized numerous complex expeditions to the Central Asia, Transcaucasus, Crimea, Russian Far East and other regions of the Soviet Union to study endemic parasitic and transmissible diseases (tick-borne relapsing fever, tick-borne encephalitis, Pappataci fever, leishmaniasis etc.). Pavlovsky introduced the concept of natural nidality of human diseases, defined by the idea that microscale disease foci are determined by the entire ecosystem. This concept laid the foundation for the elaboration of a number of preventive measures and promoted the development of the environmental trend in parasitology (together with the works of parasitologist Valentin Dogel). Yevgeny Pavlovsky researched host organism as a habitat for parasites (parasitocenosis), numerous matters of regional and landscape parasitology, life cycles of a number of parasites, pathogenesis of helminth infection. Pavlovsky and his fellow scientists researched the fauna of flying blood-sucking insects (gnat) and methods of controlling them and venomous animals and characteristics of their venom. He was a deputy of the Supreme Soviet of the Soviet Union of the 2nd, 3rd, and 4th convocations.

== Publications ==
Pavlovsky's principal works are dedicated to the matters of parasitology. He authored several textbooks and manuals on parasitology.

== Awards and honors ==
- Order of the Red Star (1936)
- Two Stalin Prizes (1941, 1950)
- Six Orders of Lenin (1944, 1945, 1945, 1954, 1961, 1964)
- Two Orders of the Red Banner (1944, 1948)
- Two Orders of the Red Banner of Labour (1948, 1954)
- Darwin–Wallace Medal (1958)
- Hero of Socialist Labour (1964)
- Lenin Prize (1965)
- Jubilee Medal "XX Years of the Workers' and Peasants' Red Army"
