= Nove Davydkovo =

Coordinates: 48°27′N 22°38′E

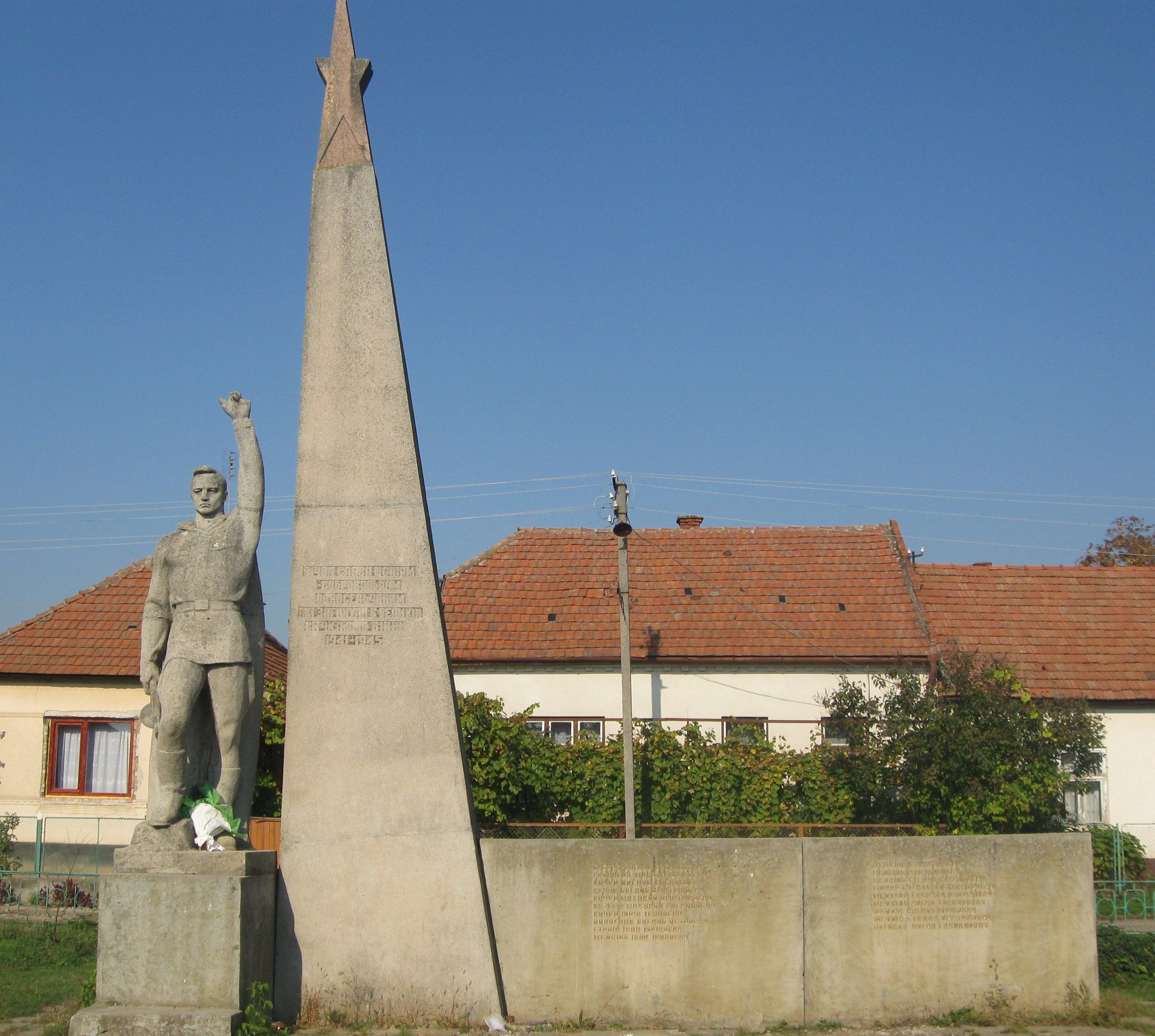
Monument to villagers in Nove Davydkovo

Nove Davydkovo (Ukrainian: Нове Давидково, Hungarian: Újdávidháza, Russian: Новое Давыдково) is a small farming village in the suburbs of Mukachevo in Zakarpattia Oblast (province) of western Ukraine.

It lies in a plain beneath the Palanok Castle near the foothills of the Carpathian Mountains. Historically, it was part of the Kingdom of Hungary from the 11th century until 1918, when it was called Uj-Dávidháza, meaning "David's new home." It was located in Bereg megyé (county) and Munkácsi járás (district). It then became part of Czechoslovakia (1918-1938), when the region was referred to as Podkarpatská Rus (Sub-Carpathia), and the town was called Nové Davidkovo. The region reverted to Hungary during World War II, and then was annexed to the Soviet Union, in 1945, until Ukrainian independence in 1991. Today, it is part of Mukachevo Raion and the Zakarpattia Oblast of Ukraine.

Other spellings/names for Nove Davydkovo are: Novoye Davydkovo, Nove Davydkove and Nowe Dawydkowo. In Yiddish, it was referred to as Greis Davidkif.

Nove Davydkovo is located about 4 miles West of Mukacheve.
