= Mikhail Chumakov =

Soviet microbiologist, virologist

Mikhail Petrovich Chumakov
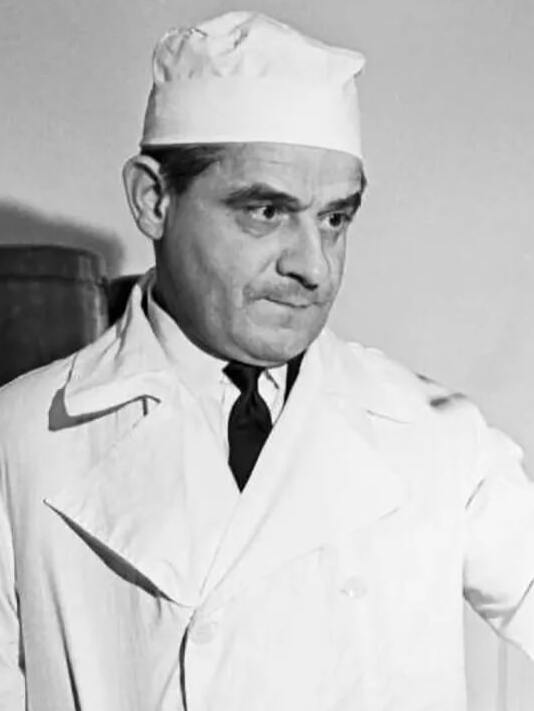
- January 1962
- Born: 14 November 1909; Yepifan, Tula Governorate, Russian Empire
- Died: 11 June 1993 (aged 83); Moscow, Russian Federation
- Education: Moscow State University
- Known for: Discovery of Tick-borne encephalitis virus Clinical trial of Oral Polio Vaccine
- Awards: Stalin Prize of First Degree in Science and Technology(1941); Lenin Prize in Science and Technology (1963); Hero of Socialist Labour (1983)
- Scientific career
- Fields: Microbiology, Virology
- Workplaces: D.I.Ivanovsky Institute of Virology, Moscow, USSR; M.P.Chumakov Institute of Poliomyelitis and VIral Encephalitides, Russian Academy of Medical Sciences

Mikhail Petrovich Chumakov (Russian: Михаи́л Петро́вич Чумако́в; 14 November 1909 – 11 June 1993) was a Soviet Russian microbiologist and virologist most famous for conducting pivotal large-scale clinical trials that led to licensing of the Oral Polio Vaccine (OPV) developed by Albert B. Sabin.

== Life and work ==
Chumakov graduated in 1931 from Moscow State University Medical School that was later transformed into I.M. Sechenov Moscow Medical Academy. In 1937 Chumakov participated in a scientific expedition to Khabarovsk region of Soviet Far East that was led by Professor Lev A. Zilber. Together with his colleagues he discovered the etiology of a new transmissible neurological disease called tick-borne encephalitis (TBE) and isolated the virus that causes it. He was accidentally infected with the virus and developed encephalitis that led to a permanent loss of hearing and paralysis of the right arm. For this discovery he was awarded Stalin Prize of First Degree in Science and Technology in 1941. In 1948 Chumakov became a corresponding member, and in 1960 a full member of Academy of Medical Sciences of the USSR. Beginning in the 1940s Chumakov organized multiple medical expeditions to Siberia and other regions of the Soviet Union to investigate outbreaks caused by new viruses. Among viruses discovered and studied by Chumakov are Omsk hemorrhagic fever and Kemerovo fever viruses, hantavirus causing renal syndrome, Crimean-Congo Hemorrhagic Fever virus, and many others. From 1950 he was the Director of the Ivanovsky Institute of Virology in Moscow. In 1952 as a part of the anti-Semitic campaign in the Soviet Union known as Doctors' plot he was removed from the Ivanovsky Institute for refusal to fire Jewish associates. In 1955 he organized a new research institute near Moscow to work on vaccines against poliomyelitis. His work on vaccines against poliomyelitis was done in close collaboration with American scientists including Jonas Salk and Albert Sabin. In 1958-1959 he and his wife Marina Voroshilova organized the first mass production and clinical trials of Oral Poliovirus Vaccine (OPV) made from live attenuated strains developed by Albert Sabin. This made the Soviet Union the first country to develop, produce, license and widely use this highly effective vaccine that practically eliminated poliomyelitis from the country in the first few years of its use. The vaccine produced by Chumakov's Institute was exported into more than 60 countries, and was instrumental in stopping large outbreaks of poliomyelitis in Eastern Europe and Japan. The success of the Russian clinical trials was critical to OPV licensing in the United States in 1962, and the vaccine becoming the main tool used in global poliomyelitis eradication campaign. Chumakov also created a number of other human and veterinarian vaccines, including inactivated vaccine against TBE, measles, influenza and vaccine against Canine distemper virus that is widely used to protect farmed fur animals. Chumakov published more than 960 research papers, scholarly articles and books.

Chumakov held an Honoris Causa degree from Academia Leopoldina in Germany and was an Honorary member of the Hungarian Academy of Sciences. He also was an honorary member of Medical Societies and Academies of several other countries. After Chumakov's death, the Institute that he founded was renamed in his honor as M.P.Chumakov Institute of Poliomyelitis and Viral Encephalitides of the Russian Academy of Medical Sciences. In 2016 the Institute and its vaccine manufacturing facility were reorganized into M.P. Chumakov Center for Research and Development of Biological Products of the Russian Academy of Sciences. A main-belt asteroid 5465 Chumakov discovered by Lyudmila Georgievna Karachkina was also named in his honor.
