= Berehove urban hromada =

Urban hromada in Zakarpattia Oblast, Ukraine

Berehove urban hromada Берегівська міська громада
- Hromada
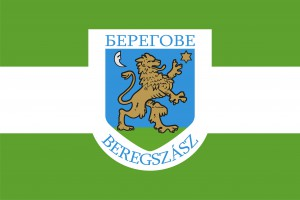
- Flag

- Location within Zakarpattia Oblast Location within Ukraine
- Coordinates: 48°12′20″N 22°38′50″E
- Country: Ukraine
- Oblast (province): Zakarpattia Oblast
- Raion (district): Berehove Raion

Area
  - Total: 266.9 km^{2} (103.1 sq mi)

Population (2023)
  - Total: 44,128

Berehove urban territorial hromada (Ukrainian: Берегівська міська територільна громада, romanized: Berehivska miska terytorialna hromada) is one of the hromadas of Ukraine, located in the country's western Zakarpattia Oblast. The hromada's capital is the city of Berehove.

The hromada has an area of 255.6 km^{2} (98.7 mi^{2}), as well as a population of 44,128 (as of 2023).

== Settlements ==
In addition to one city (Berehove), the hromada includes 17 villages:

- Badalovo
- Balazher
- Bene
- Borzhava
- Vary
- Velyka Bakta
- Halabor
- Hat
- Hecha
- Zatyshne
- Kidosh
- Muzhiyevo
- Orosiyevo
- Chetfalva
- Chykosh-Horonda
- Choma
- Yanoshi
