= Hat, Berehove Raion =

Hat
- Village
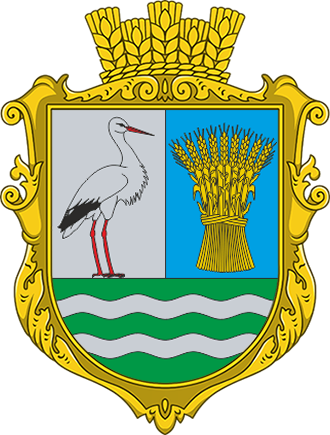
- Coat of arms

- Location within Zakarpattia Oblast
- Coordinates: 48°19′13″N 22°38′22″E
- Country: Ukraine
- Oblast: Zakarpattia Oblast
- Raion: Berehove Raion

Hat' (Ukrainian: Гать, Hungarian: Gát) is a village in Zakarpattia Oblast (province) of western Ukraine. It is located approximately 12 kilometres (7.5 mi) northwest of Berehove, and 16 kilometres (9.9 mi) southwest of Mukachevo. Administratively, the village belongs to the Berehove Raion, Zakarpattia Oblast. Historically, the village was first mentioned as Gath in 1374.

== Population ==
In 1921, the village had a population of 1,967, mostly Hungarians. As of 2012, the population includes 3,150 inhabitants, out of which, 3,050 (~96.8%) are Hungarians.
