= Maria Theresia Garden Square (Uzhhorod) =

Square in Uzhhorod, Ukraine

Coordinates: 48.622455°N 22.302183°E

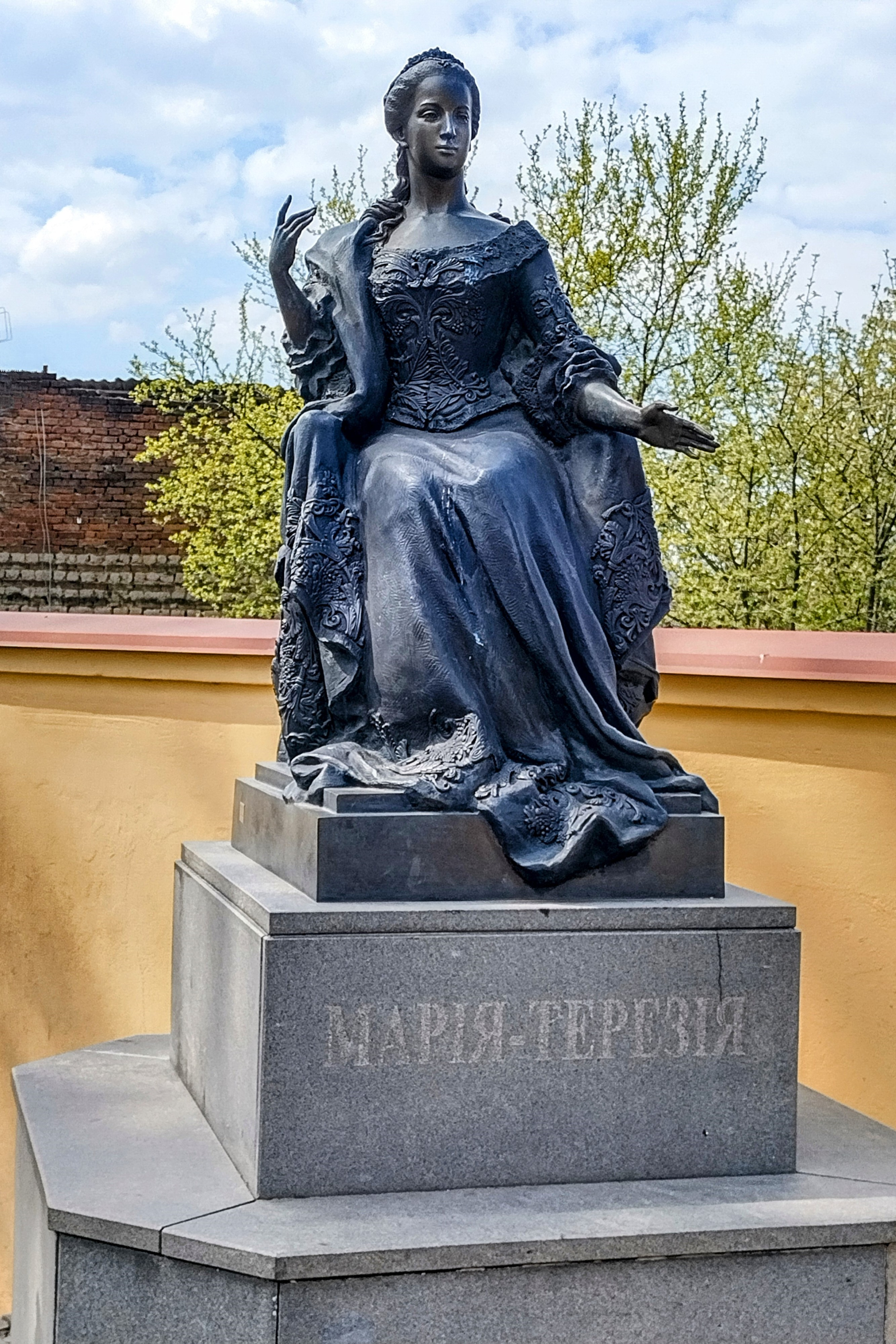
Bronze statue of Empress Maria Theresa at the square in Uzhhorod

The Maria Theresia Square (Ukrainian: Сквер Марії Терезії) situated in Uzhhorod, Ukraine.The idea of establishment belongs to Uzhhorod diplomat, lawyer and public figure Alen Panov. It was presented to public in May 2013, supported by Most Reverend Milan the bishop of Mukachevo Greek Catholic eparchy.

== Objectives ==
The construction of the square with a garden was aimed in order to provide the panoramic view of the cathedral and to keep in memory Empress Maria Theresa and other historical figures that mostly contributed to the development of the Castle Quarter

== Etymology ==
The private garden square is named after the Holy Roman Empress, Queen of Hungary, and Archduchess of Austria. Her reign became one of the most meaningful periods for the city formation. During that time Uzhhorod grew into a regional center. The location became the capital of newly founded Greek Catholic eparchy that united some of Counties of ancient Zakarpattya. The Maria-Theresia monument by Bohdan Tomashevskyi is its central figure.

The Pantheon of Castle Quarter (artist - Mykhailo and Nataliya Tesovskyi; designers - Ivan and Anna Ivanysh, landscape designer – Victor Meshko, works supervisor Mykhailo Sobran) represents effigies of people who in the course of urban development made a significant contribution for the oldest part of Uzhhorod to get the present look.

Among them:

- Szent István (967-1038), the first Hungarian King that accepted Christianity and laid the foundations of the state. During his reign the Castle became the center of newly founded Ung County – the territorial unit that existed for more than 1000 years long.

- Charles Robert (1288-1342), the Hungarian King born in Naples. He belonged to the famous French dynasty of Anjou that governed in many European states. It was him who handed Uzhgorod next to Drugeth.

- Philip Drugeth (?1290-1327) - the count, nearest ally of Carl Robert, palatine of . An Italian of French Provence origin who laid the Drugeth dynasty that owned Uzhgorod for over 350 years. Uzhgorod Castle received its modern look during the reign of this dynasty.

- Miklós Bercsényi (1665-1725) - the count, one of the most known owners of the Uzhgorod Castle. He turned the city into the important political and cultural center of Middle Europe.

- Andrii Bachynskiy (1732-1809) - the first full competent Greek-catholic bishop who turned Uzhgorod into the center of diocese. His activity laid down to the foundation for the powerful development of the city as the diocese started to manage the Uzhgorod Castle and whole Castle Quarter.

Founding of the garden square was the first private initiative in Ukraine and carried out thanks to the efforts of founders the Panov family.
