= Bereg County =

County of the Kingdom of Hungary

Bereg County Comitatus Bereghiensis (Latin) Bereg vármegye (Hungarian) Komitat Bereg (German) Жупа Берег (Rusyn)
- County of the Kingdom of Hungary (13th century-1544); County of the Eastern Hungarian Kingdom (1544-1570); County of the Kingdom of Hungary (1570-1621); County of the Principality of Transylvania (1621-1629); County of the Kingdom of Hungary (1629-1645); County of the Principality of Transylvania (1645-1648); County of the Kingdom of Hungary (1648-1923, 1940-1945)
- Coat of arms

- Capital: Munkács; Beregszász (1867-1920); Tarpa (1920-1923)
- Area
  - Coordinates: 48°12′N 22°39′E
  - 1910: 3,786 km^{2} (1,462 sq mi)
- Population
  - 1910: 236,611
- History
  - Established: 13th century
  - Treaty of Trianon: 4 June 1920
  - Merged into Szatmár-Ugocsa-Bereg County: 1923
  - Merged into Bereg-Ugocsa County (First Vienna Award): 2 November 1938
  - County recreated (Second Vienna Award): 30 August 1940
  - Disestablished: 1945
- Today part of: Ukraine (3,327 km^{2}); Hungary (459 km^{2})
- Mukachevo; Berehove is the current name of the capital.

Bereg (Rusyn: Береґ; German: Berg) was an administrative county (comitatus) of the Kingdom of Hungary. Its territory is now mostly in western Ukraine and a smaller part in northeastern Hungary. The capital of the county was Beregszász ("Berehove" in Ukrainian, Berehovo in Rusyn, Bergsaß in German, Beregovo in Russian, Bereg in Romanian).

== Geography ==
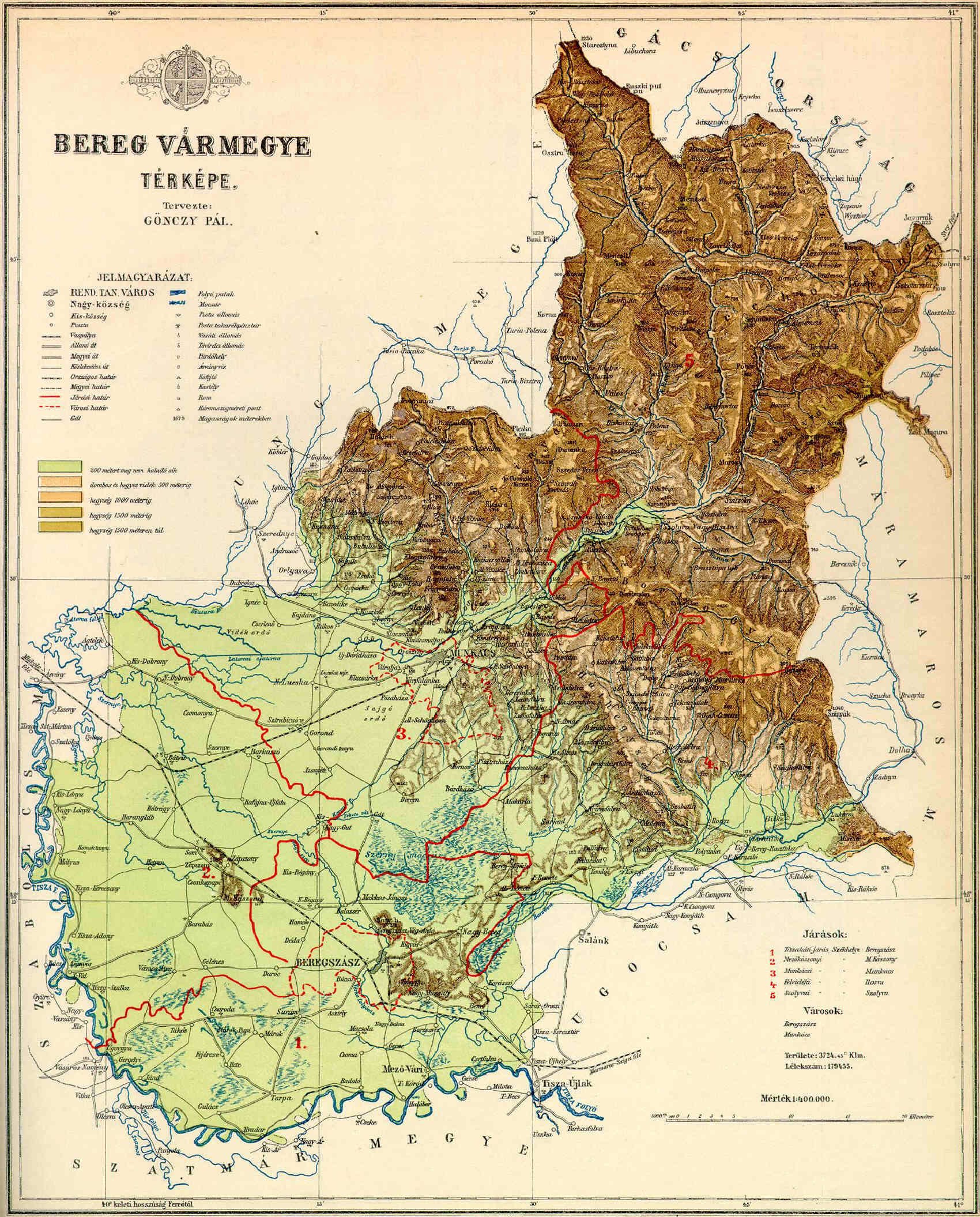
Map of Bereg, 1891.

Bereg county shared borders with the Austrian crownland Galicia (now in Poland and Ukraine) and the Hungarian counties Máramaros, Ugocsa, Szatmár, Szabolcs and Ung. It was situated between the Carpathian Mountains in the north and the river Tisza in the south. Its area was 3788 km^{2} around 1910.

== History ==
Bereg is one of the oldest counties in Hungary. In 1920 the Treaty of Trianon assigned most of the territory to Czechoslovakia. The southwestern part remained in Hungary and the county of Szatmár-Ugocsa-Bereg was created in 1923.

Following the First Vienna Award Szatmár County was recreated, thus Bereg-Ugocsa county was created with Beregszász as capital. In 1939, after the breakup of Czechoslovakia the complete county was occupied and annexed by Hungary, however the redeemed territories of the former county remained separate as the administrative branch offices of Bereg.

After the Second Vienna Award, the county was recreated again.

After World War II, most of the territory of Bereg county became part of the Soviet Union, Ukrainian SSR, Zakarpattia Oblast. The remainder was merged into the newly formed Szatmár-Bereg County. In 1950 it became part of Szabolcs-Szatmár County, which was renamed in 1990 to Szabolcs-Szatmár-Bereg.

Since 1991, when the Soviet Union split up, the Zakarpattya region is part of Ukraine.

== Demographics ==
=== 1900 ===
In 1900, the county had a population of 208,589 people and was composed of the following linguistic communities:

Total:

- Ruthenian: 95,308 (45.7%)
- Hungarian: 93,198 (44.7%)
- German: 18,639 (8.9%)
- Slovak: 991 (0.5%)
- Romanian: 72 (0.0%)
- Croatian: 20 (0.0%)
- Serbian: 0 (0.0%)
- Other or unknown: 361 (0,2%)

According to the census of 1900, the county was composed of the following religious communities:

Total:

- Greek Catholic: 103,261 (49.5%)
- Calvinist: 56,289 (27.0%)
- Jewish: 29,052 (13.9%)
- Roman Catholic: 19,128 (9.2%)
- Lutheran: 780 (0.4%)
- Greek Orthodox: 44 (0.0%)
- Unitarian: 26 (0.0%)
- Other or unknown: 9 (0.0%)

=== 1910 ===
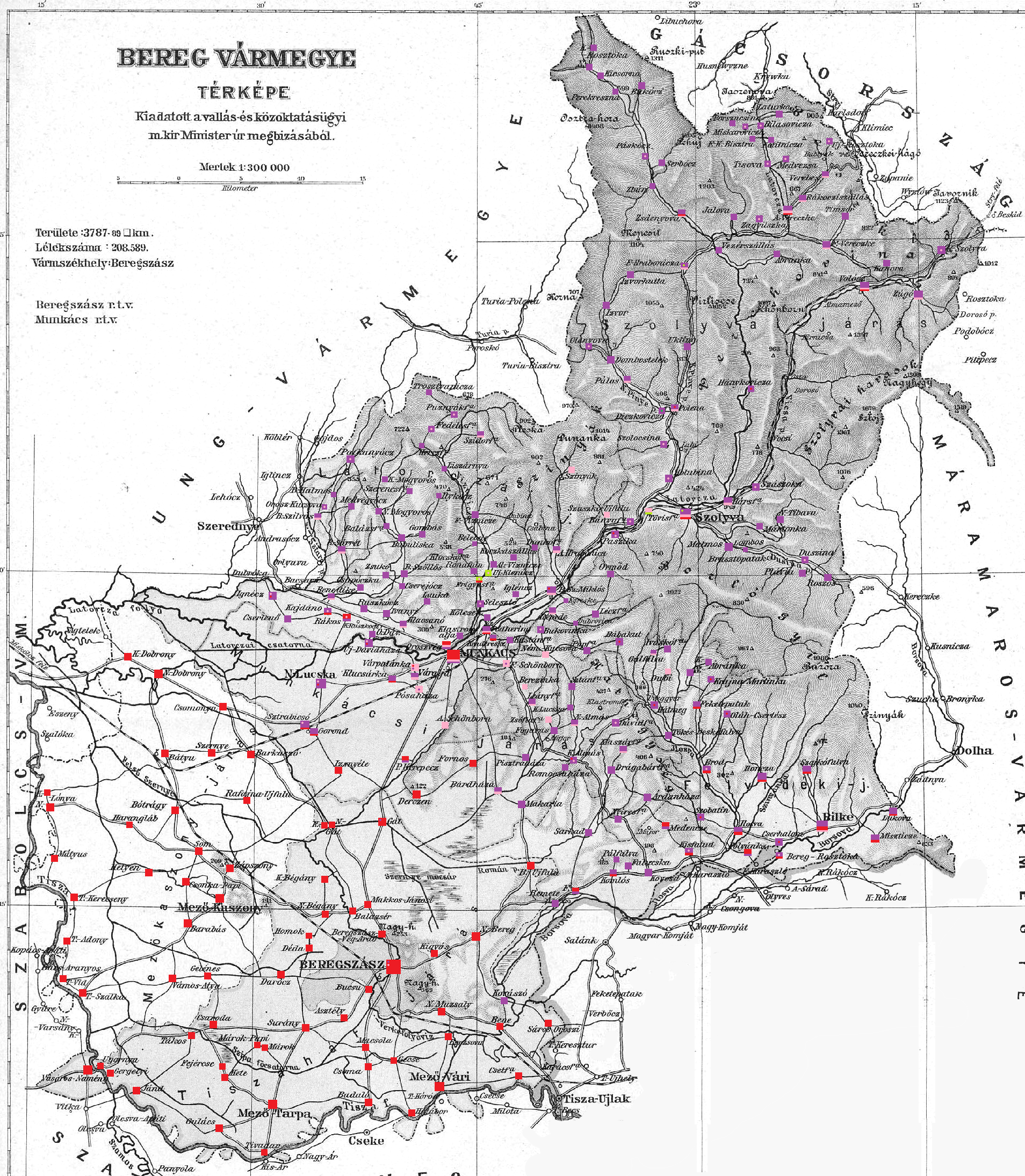
Ethnic map of the county with data of the 1910 census (see the key in the description).

In 1910, the county had a population of 236,611 people and was composed of the following linguistic communities:

Total:

- Hungarian: 113,090 (47.8%)
- Ruthenian: 100,918 (42.6%)
- German: 20,722 (8.8%)
- Slovak: 1,123 (0.5%)
- Romanian: 215 (0.1%)
- Croatian: 54 (0.0%)
- Serbian: 12 (0.0%)
- Other or unknown: 477 (0.2%)

According to the census of 1910, the county was composed of the following religious communities:

Total:

- Greek Catholic: 117,435 (49.7%)
- Calvinist: 61,106 (25.9%)
- Jewish: 33,660 (14.2%)
- Roman Catholic: 23,003 (9.7%)
- Lutheran: 992 (0.4%)
- Greek Orthodox: 349 (0.0%)
- Unitarian: 13 (0.1%)
- Other or unknown: 53 (0.0%)

== Subdivisions ==
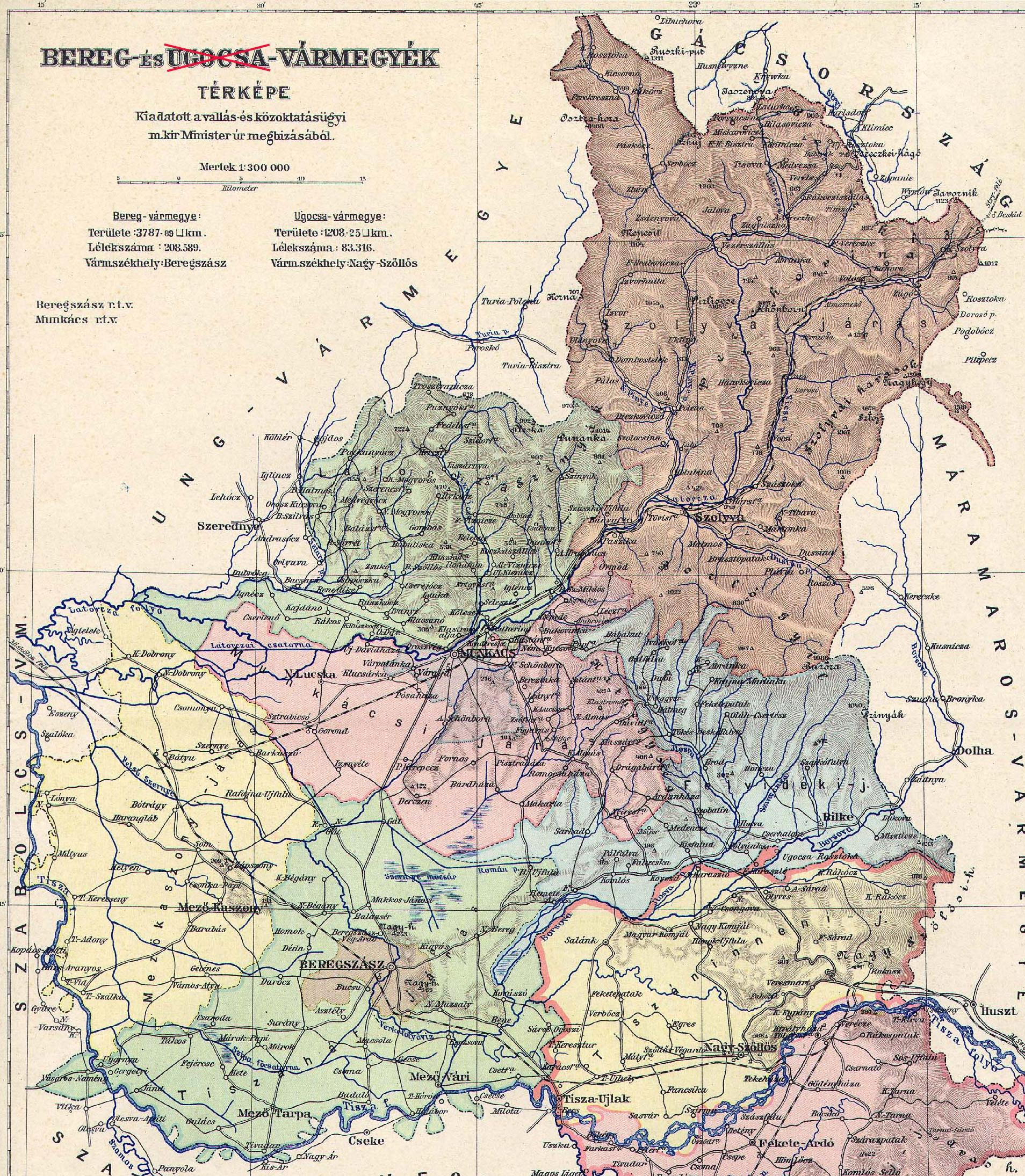

In the early 20th century, the subdivisions of Bereg county were:

Districts (járás)
District	Capital
Alsóverecke	Alsóverecke, (Ukrainian: Nyzhni Vorota, Rusyn: Nyzhn'ŷ Verec'kŷ)
Felvidék	Ilosva, (Ukrainian: Irshava, Rusyn: Yrshava)
Latorca	Oroszvég, (Ukrainian: Rosvegove, Rusyn: Rosvyhovo part of Mukachevo)
Mezőkaszony	Mezőkaszony, (Ukrainian: Koson', Rusyn: Koson')
Munkács	Munkács, (Ukrainian: Mukacheve, Rusyn: Mukachovo)
Szolyva	Szolyva, (Ukrainian: Svaliava, Rusyn: Svaliava)
Tiszahát	Beregszász, (Ukrainian: Berehove, Rusyn: Berehovo)
Urban districts (rendezett tanácsú város)
Beregszász, (Ukrainian: Berehove, Rusyn: Berehovo)
Munkács, (Ukrainian: Mukacheve, Rusyn: Mukachovo)

All the towns mentioned are now in Ukraine.

== Culture ==
- Bereg cross stitch, an ancient traditional needlework
