= Bereg cross stitch =

Hungarian folk art

Bereg cross stitch is an ancient tradition preserving folk arts disciplines. The center of cultivation is at the eastern part of Hungary, the so-called Bereg landscape.

The Bereg full cross is stitch needlework. The raw material is drawing canvas without colored filet silk is the pattern. The most common patterns are of birds, little flowers, the tulip, lily of the acorn and the Rákóczi pattern. The patterns are constantly changing, with new motifs and colors are expanding, but retain the basic form of the specific nature of the landscape. The traditional type of embroidery uses colors of red and blue, but there is already light blue-dark blue, red, black, or purple color version. The decorative motifs embroidering frequently used items such as blue copper ore the subrika or contour. They are more valuable to make the pattern. The Bereg samples rich in treasure, but in the public mind there are only few live versions. In one of the most popular designs of flowers, including roses, tulips and carnations which has the greatest role. These motifs appear in many different forms, the width of the span of 1–2 cm in size.

Each works are of all shapes according to own preferences. The original cross stitch Bereg red and blue color scheme made now rather red and black colors are used, but are made of handmade brown and blue as well. This cross stitch has been used since the 18th century.
