= Alen Panov =

Ukrainian diplomat

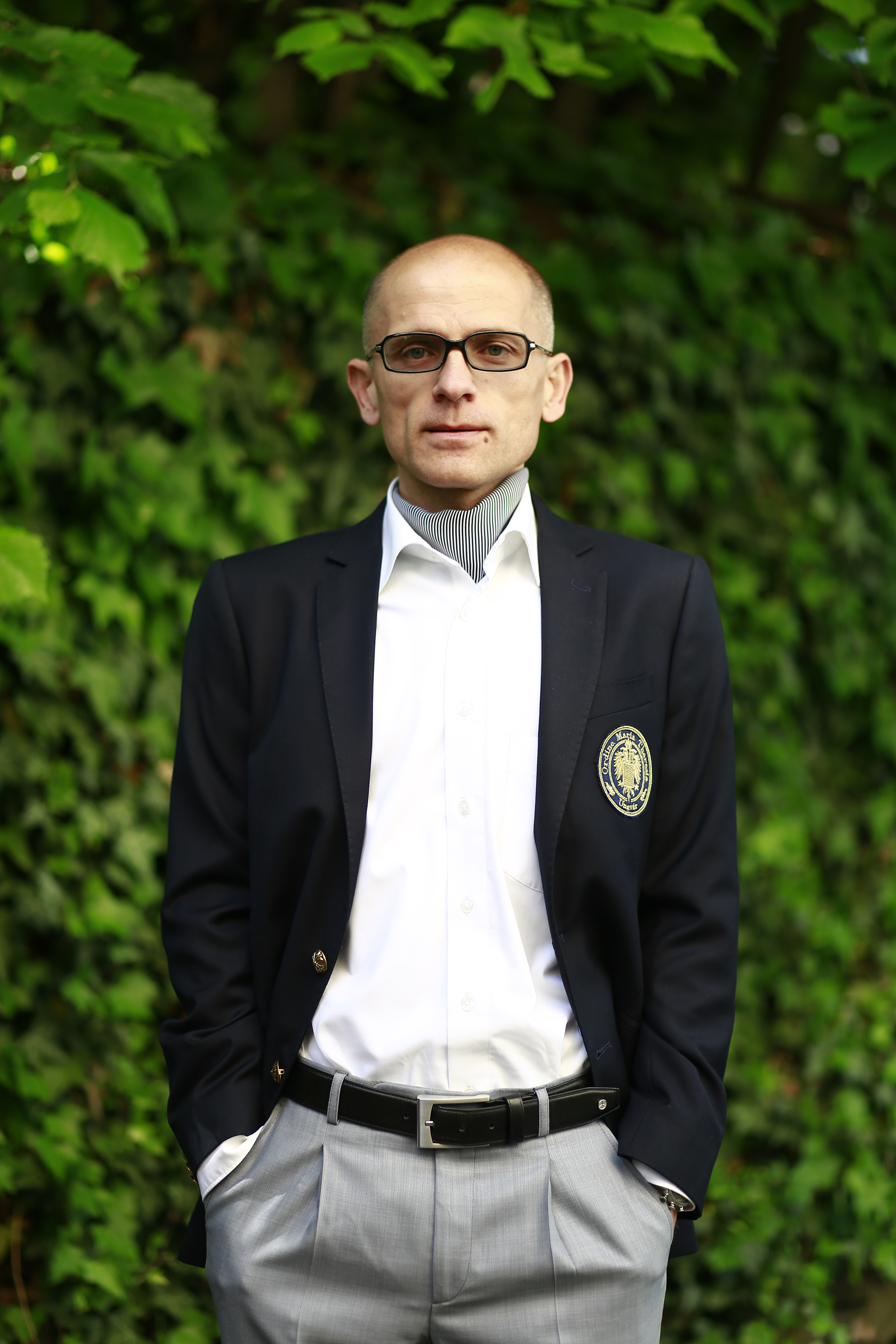
Alen Panov

Alen Panov (born February 14, 1978) is a Ukrainian diplomat, lawyer and public figure, professor, and a Head of the International Politics Academic Department, Uzhhorod National University.

== Biography ==
Panov was born in Berehove, Ukrainian SSR and received a master's degree in law and PhD in history from Uzhhorod National University. He began his career as a school teacher and university assistant lecturer. From 1999 he was the Permanent National Representative (Head of the Mission) to Carpathian Euroregion – the first international regional organization in post-socialist countries in Eastern Europe, united 23 regions from Hungary, Poland, Romania, Slovakia, Ukraine. In 2002, he became deputy mayor of Uzhhorod. From 2006, he was the Ukrainian consul in Hungary, with a residence in Nyíregyháza. During his diplomatic mission, he won the trial about limiting local border traffic opportunities for citizens of Ukraine at the Hungarian Court. This was the first precedent in the consular practice of Ukraine and the EU, later confirmed by EU Court of Justice.

From 2010 Professor, Head of The International Politics Academic Department at the Uzhhorod National University. Author of 16 monographs and books. Hungarian Academy of Science Body, Foreign Member. Chairman of the Ukrainian Union of Diplomats, Zakkarpattya Directorate from 2011. Author of the idea and founder of Maria Theresia Garden Square in Uzhhorod, which was the first private garden square in Ukraine. The author of the Renaissance of Uzhhorod concept, in the framework of which he is engaged in the restoration of antique mansions on historical Castle Hill.
