= Berehove =

City in Zakarpattia Oblast, Ukraine

Berehove Берегове (Ukrainian) Beregszász (Hungarian)
- City
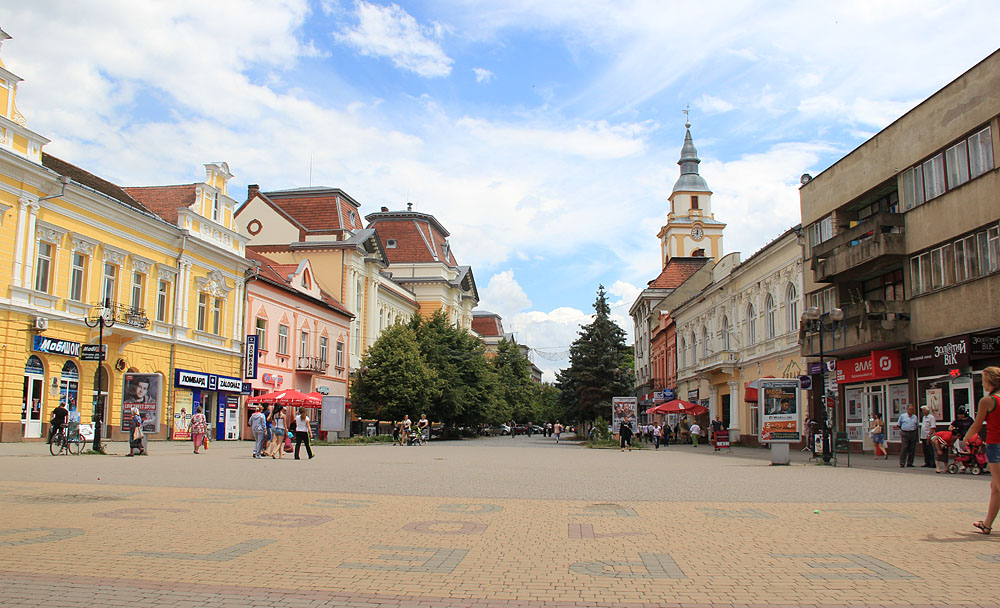
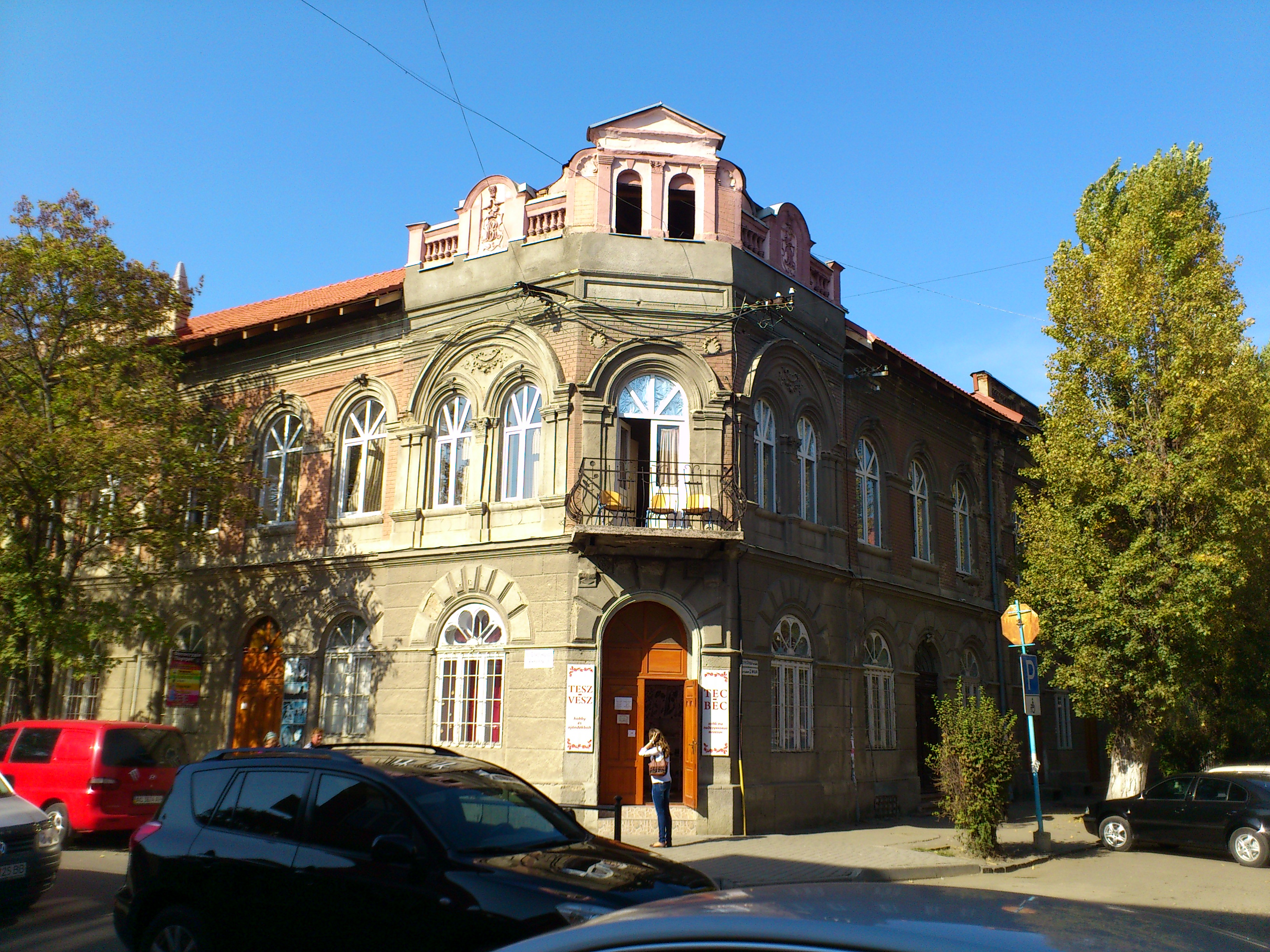
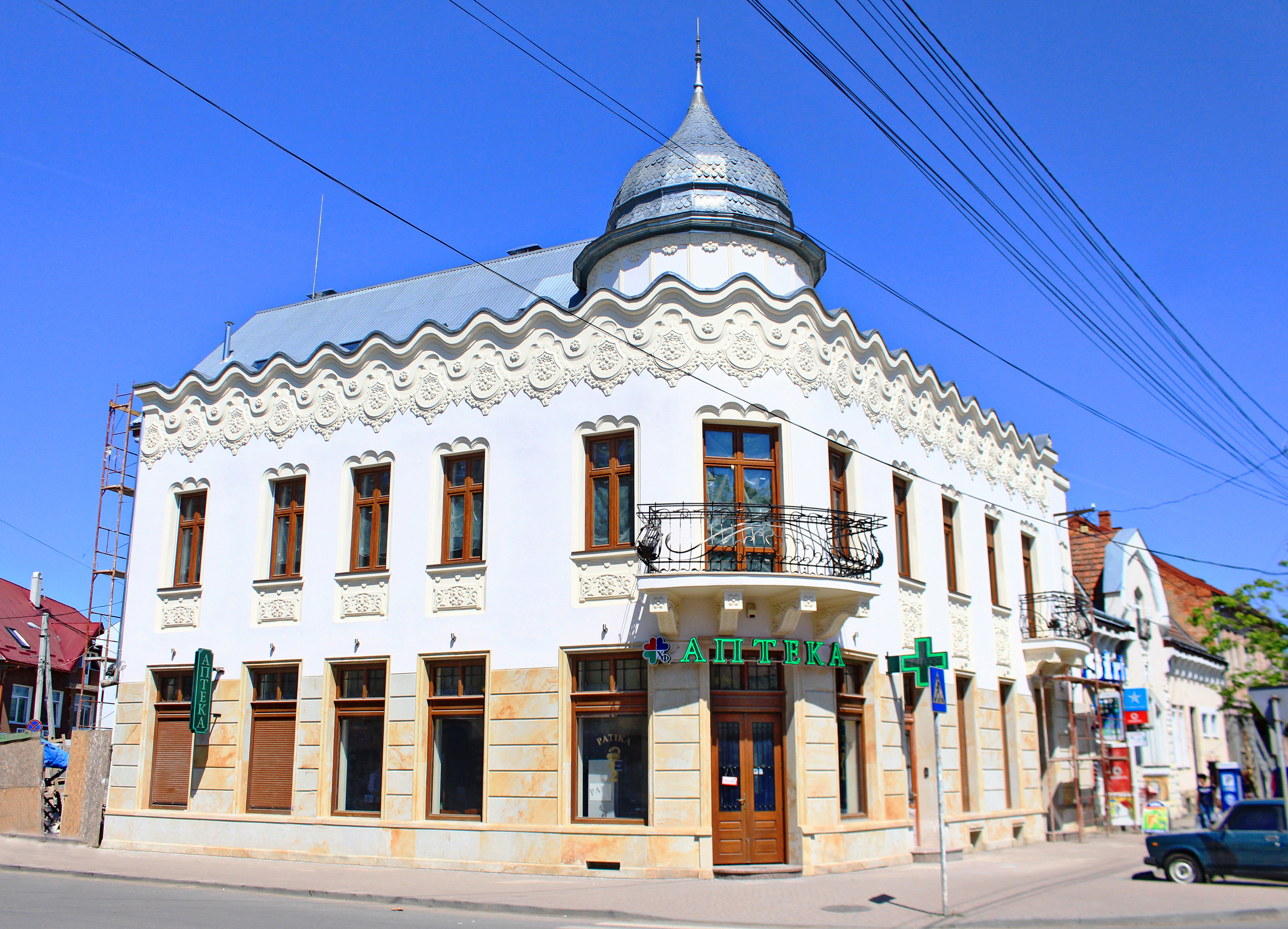
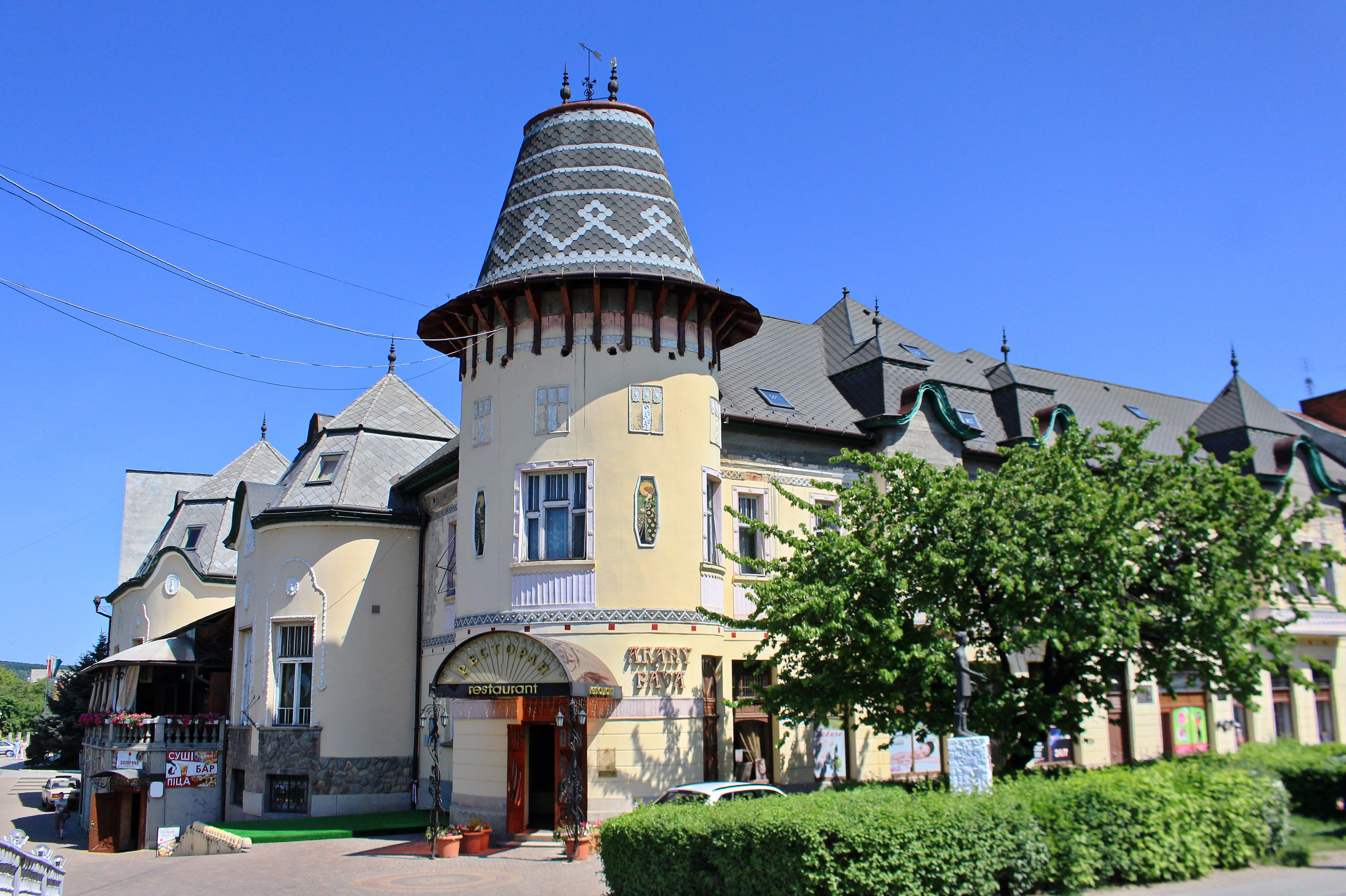
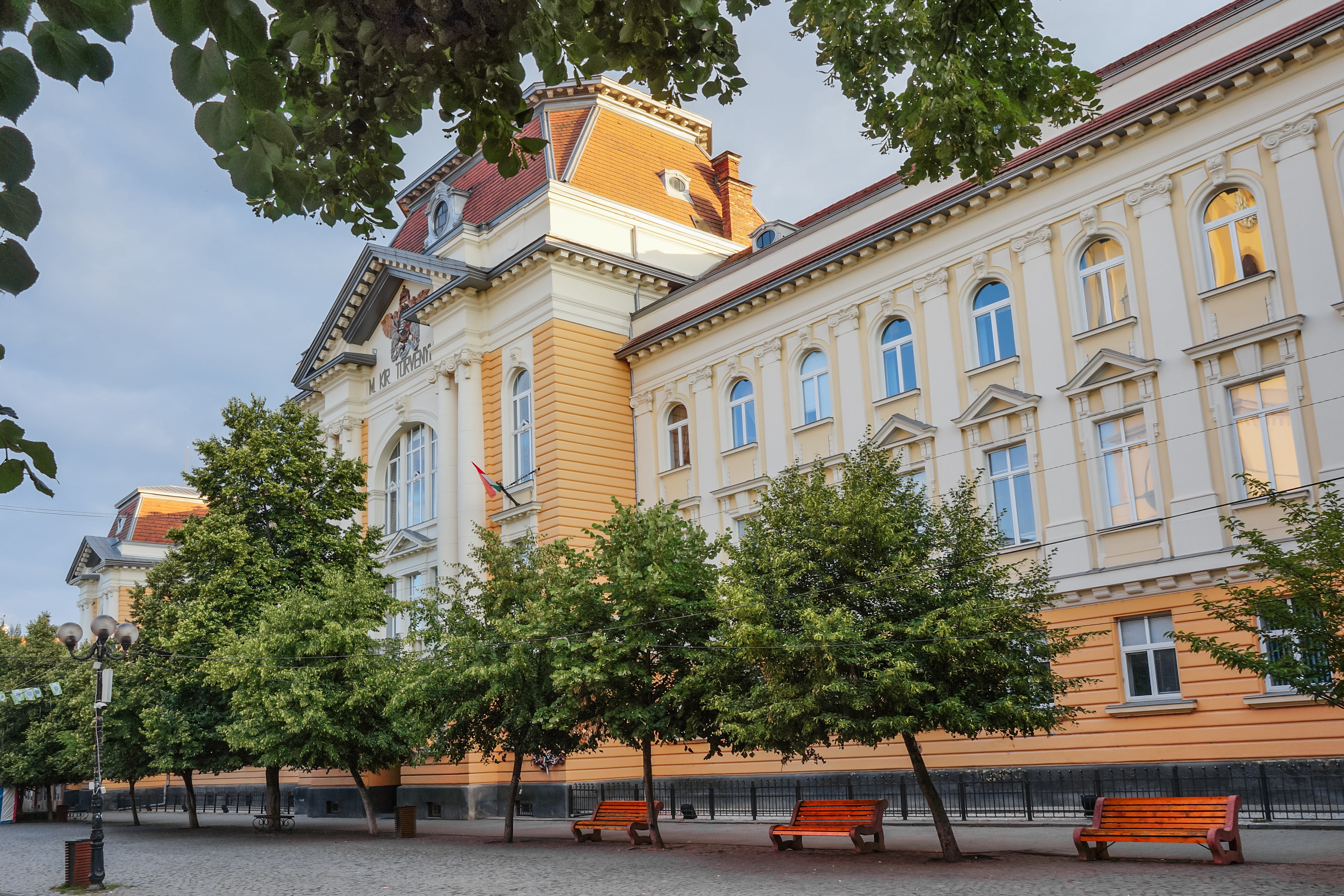
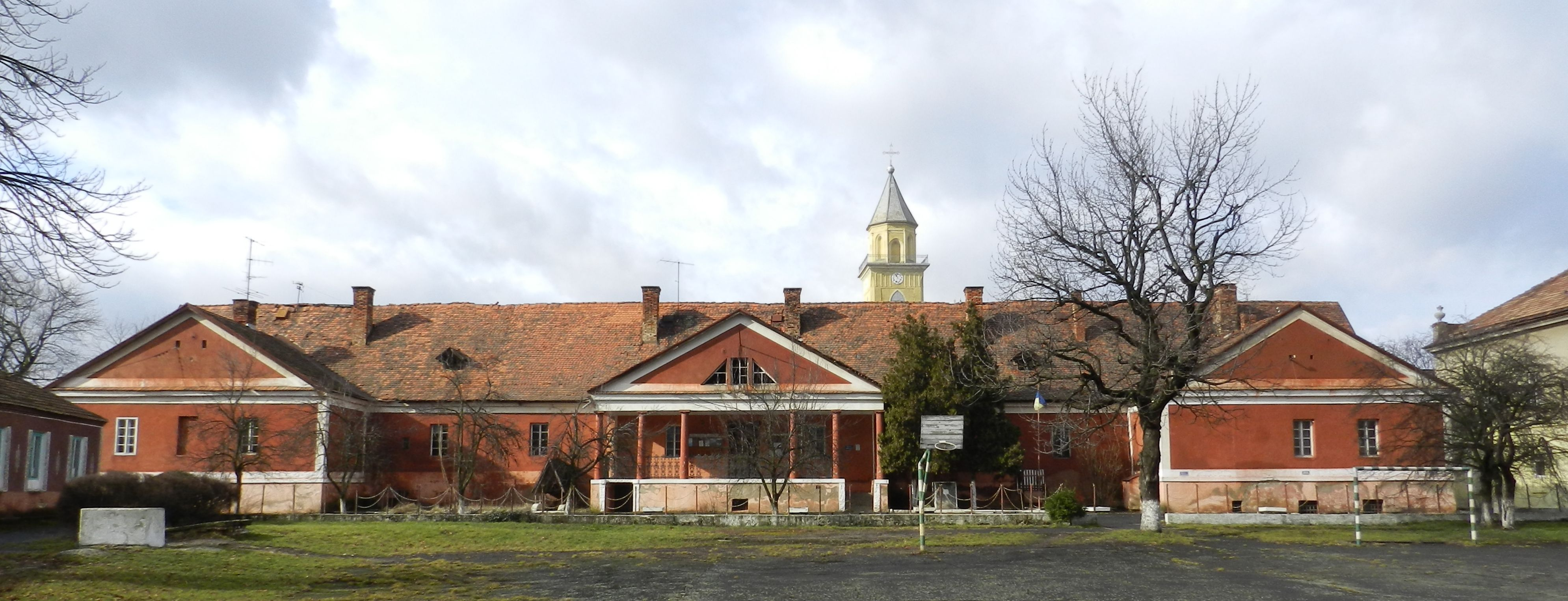
- Clockwise from top: Koshuta Square; Residential House at Secheni Street, 32; Palace of the Committee Court; Court of Count Gabor Betlen; Casino Building; Reformist Dormitory

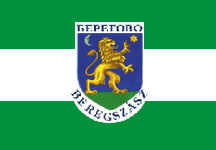
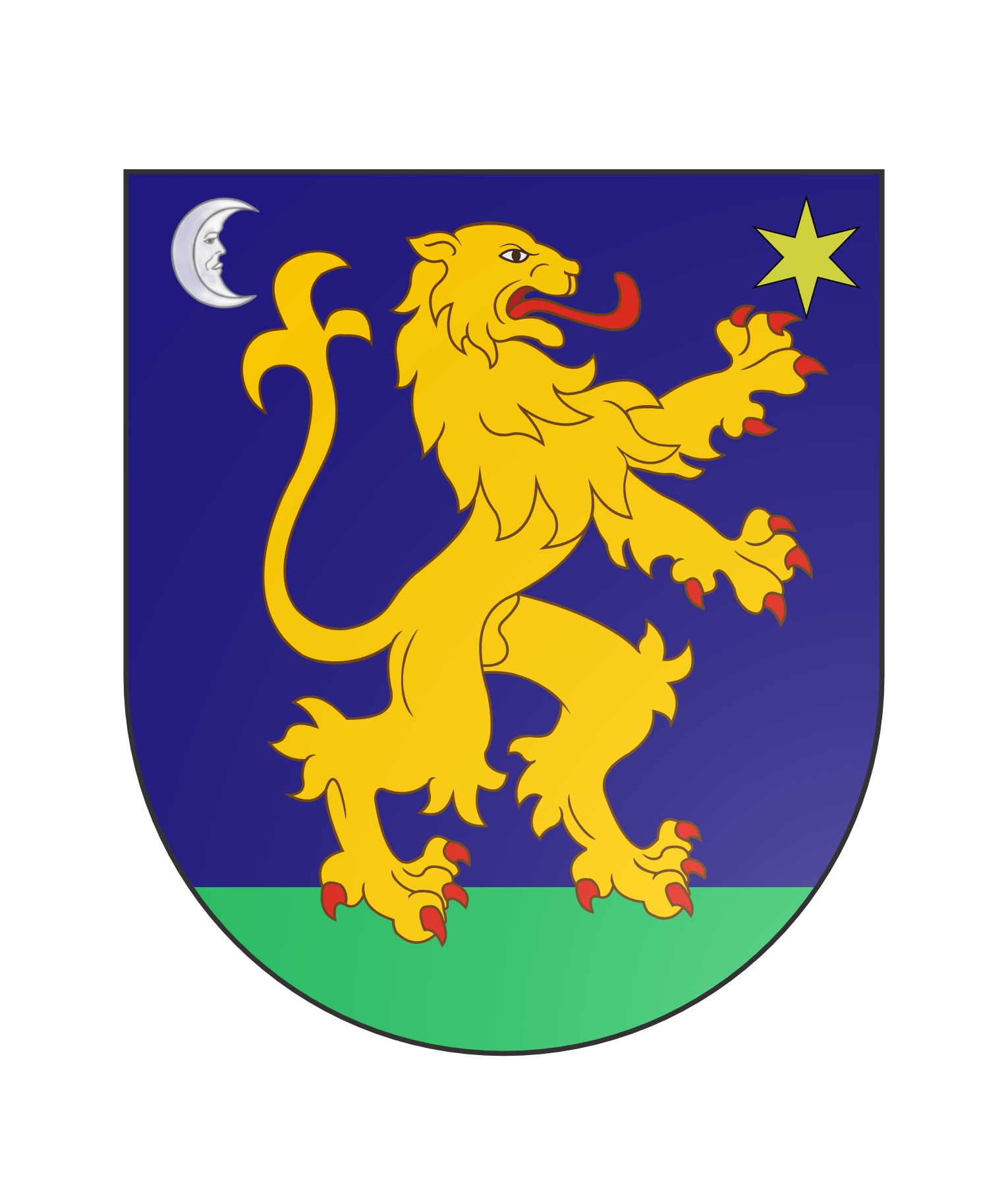
- Flag Coat of arms

- Location of Berehove Berehove (Ukraine)
- Coordinates: 48°12′20″N 22°38′50″E
- Country: Ukraine
- Oblast: Zakarpattia Oblast
- Raion: Berehove Raion
- Hromada: Berehove urban hromada
- Incorporated: 1945

Government
  - Mayor: Zoltán Babják

Area
  - Total: 30.2 km^{2} (11.7 sq mi)
- Elevation: 115 m (377 ft)

Population (2022)
  - Total: 23,325
  - Density: 772/km^{2} (2,000/sq mi)
- Time zone: UTC+2 (EET)
  - Summer (DST): UTC+3 (EEST)
- Postal code: 90200
- Area code: +380-3141
- Climate: Cfb
- Website: beregivska.gromada.org.ua

Berehove (Ukrainian: Берегове, pronounced [ˈbɛreɦowe]; Hungarian: Beregszász, pronounced [ˈbɛrɛksaːs]) is a city in Zakarpattia Oblast, western Ukraine. It is near the border with Hungary.

It is the cultural centre of the Hungarian minority in Ukraine, and Hungarians constitute roughly half (a plurality) of its population.

The city serves as the administrative center of the Berehove Raion. It has a population of 23,325 (2022 estimate).

== Name ==
The city name is derived from the Ukrainian word беріг (berih) 'river bank', with cognates in many Slavic languages. It has many different variations of spelling its name: Romanian: Bereg, Rusyn: Берегово (translit. Berehovo), Russian: Берегово (translit. Beregovo), Belarusian: Берагава (Łacinka Bierahava), Czech and Slovak: Berehovo, Yiddish: בערעגסאז, Beregsaz, German: Bergsaß, Polish: Bereg Saski.

The residents of Berehove voted on October 31, 2010, in a referendum on renaming the town Beregszász, its Hungarian-language name. Voter turnout was less than 52%, with 4,688 voting for, 4,358 against, and 1,016 invalid ballots.

== Administrative division ==
Berehove includes the nearby village of Zatyshne, which has a population of 504 people and representation in city council.

Hungarian was made a regional language in Berehove in September 2012, allowing its use in the town's administrative office work and documents. This was made possible after new legislation on languages in Ukraine was passed in the summer of 2012.

As of December 2020, all decisions of Zakarpattia's local councils on the functioning of regional languages, including Hungarian in Berehove, were cancelled.

== Geography ==
=== Climate ===
Berehove has an oceanic climate (Köppen: Cfb).

Climate data for Berehove
Month	Jan	Feb	Mar	Apr	May	Jun	Jul	Aug	Sep	Oct	Nov	Dec	Year
Daily mean °C (°F)	−2.4 (27.7)	−0.2 (31.6)	4.7 (40.5)	10.7 (51.3)	15.6 (60.1)	18.5 (65.3)	20.1 (68.2)	19.7 (67.5)	15.8 (60.4)	10.4 (50.7)	4.9 (40.8)	0.3 (32.5)	9.8 (49.6)
Average precipitation mm (inches)	45 (1.8)	38 (1.5)	39 (1.5)	46 (1.8)	69 (2.7)	86 (3.4)	74 (2.9)	68 (2.7)	48 (1.9)	44 (1.7)	51 (2.0)	58 (2.3)	666 (26.2)
Source: Climate-Data.org

== History ==
In 1824, Berehove received the right to hold fairs 12 times a year. With the abolition of serfdom, the industrial development of the city began. Enterprises appeared, and banks, savings banks, and credit institutions were opened.

In 1910, out of 12,933 inhabitants 12,432 were Hungarians (96.1%), 221 Ukrainians (Ruthenians), and 140 Germans. On April 27, 1919, the city was occupied by Czechoslovak and Romanian troops. At the end of 1919, according to the Saint-Germain Peace Treaty, it became part of Czechoslovakia.

It was the capital of the Kingdom of Hungary's Bereg County until 1920 and between 1940 and 1945.

From 1920 until 1938 it was part of Czechoslovakia. Prior to World War II, the city had a significant Jewish population, estimated at 8,000 persons. Only four returned following the war.

A local newspaper has been published in Berehove since December 1945.

In January 1989 the population was 30,157 people.

The first Hungarian-language college in Ukraine was opened in Berehove, Ferenc Rákóczi II Transcarpathian Hungarian University (Ukrainian: Закарпатський угорський університет імені Ференца Ракоці II, Hungarian: II. Rákóczi Ferenc Kárpátaljai Magyar Egyetem).

== Demographics ==
As of the 2001 Ukrainian census, Berehove had a population of 26,554 inhabitants. Numbering roughly 12,800 people, Hungarians were the largest ethnic group in the city. The second largest ethnic group were Ukrainians (10,300), followed by Romani (1,700) and Russians (1,500). The remaining population consists of Germans, Poles, Slovaks, Armenians, and Belarusians. The exact composition was as follows:

Ethnic groups in Berehove
	percent
Hungarians	48.15%
Ukrainians	38.87%
Romani	6.38%
Russians	5.44%
Slovaks	0.24%
Belarusians	0.21%
Jews	0.14%
Poles	0.08%
Armenians	0.08%
Germans	0.06%

In terms of languages, a slim majority speak Hungarian as their native language. Ukrainian is spoken by a large minority, smaller groups speak Slovak, and Armenian. The exact composition was as follows:

Native languages in Berehove
	percent
Hungarian	55.9%
Ukrainian	37.3%
Russian	6.4%
Slovak	0.1%
Armenian	0.1%
others	0.1%

== Notable people ==
- Anna Báthy (1901–1962), Hungarian soprano
- Andrea Bocskor (born 1978), politician elected to the European Parliament in the 2014 European Parliament election in Hungary. Hence, Bocskor became the first elected Ukrainian citizen in the European Parliament.
- Csaba Czébely (born 1975), drummer of Hungarian heavy metal band Pokolgép
- Sári Fedák (1879–1955), Hungarian actress and singer
- Nandor Fodor (1895–1964), parapsychologist, psychoanalyst, author and journalist
- Rabbi Hugo Gryn (1930–1996), a broadcaster in the UK
- Géza Kalocsay (1913–2008), former Hungarian and Czechoslovak footballer, football manager of Standard Liège, FK Partizan, and Górnik Zabrze
- Julius Rebek (born 1944), American chemist and expert on molecular self-assembly
- Aranka Siegal (born 1930), writer, Holocaust survivor, and recipient of the Newbery Honor and Boston Globe-Horn Book Award, both awarded to her in 1982
- Michael Moskowitz (born 1951), Ukrainian-American analytical chemist and translator, survivor of the 2023 Bedford explosion
- Oleksandr Okipniuk (born 1999), Ukrainian freestyle skier
- Alen Panov (born 1978), Ukrainian diplomat, lawyer, and professor at Uzhhorod National University
- The parents of the Nobel Prize–winning economist Milton Friedman lived in Berehove before emigrating to the United States.

== International relations ==
=== Twin towns — Sister cities ===
Berehove is twinned with:

- Przeworsk, Poland
- Satu Mare, Romania
- Gödöllő, Hungary
- Maassluis, Netherlands
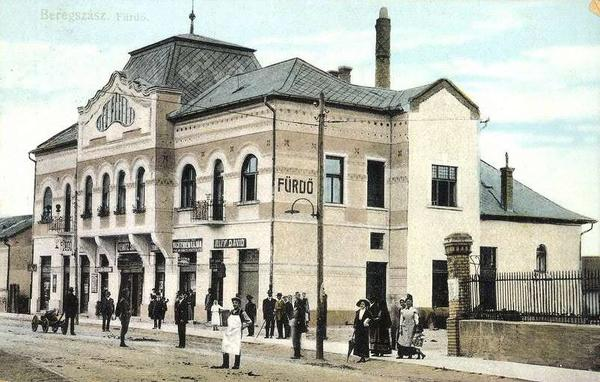
Jewish mikve in Berehove (now a bank)

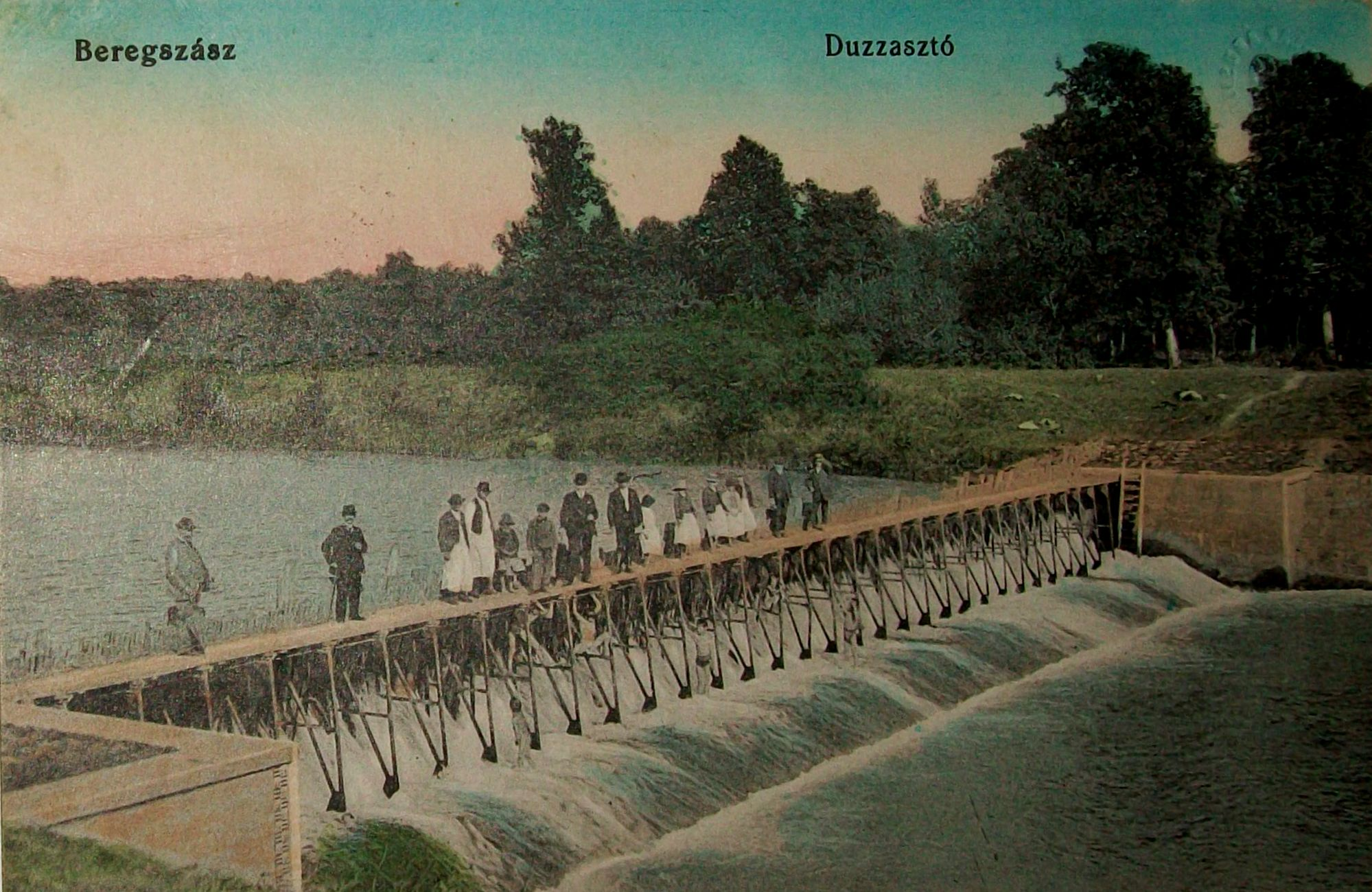
The dam in Berehove, postcard, 1900

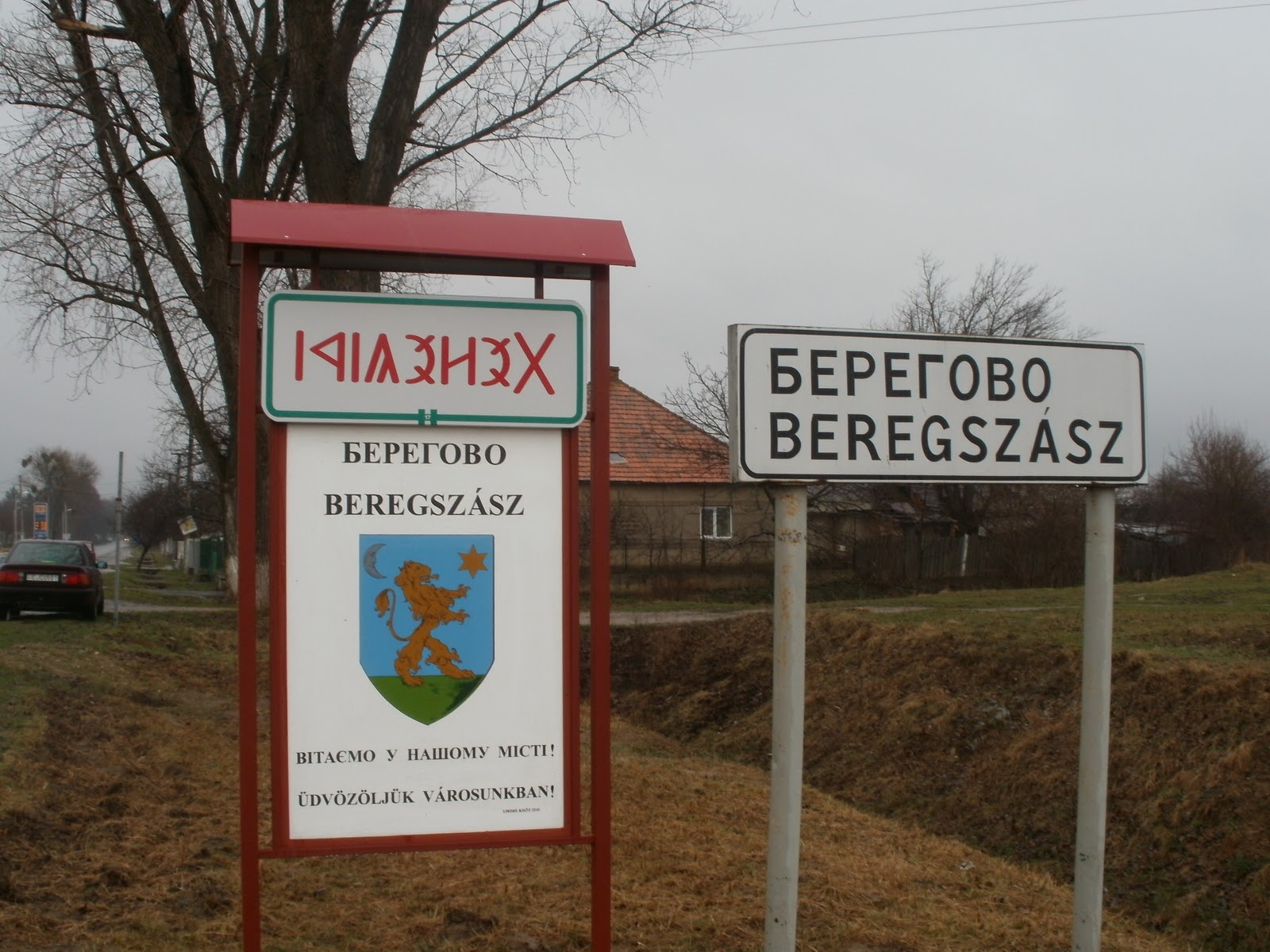
City limits sign in three alphabets and two languages

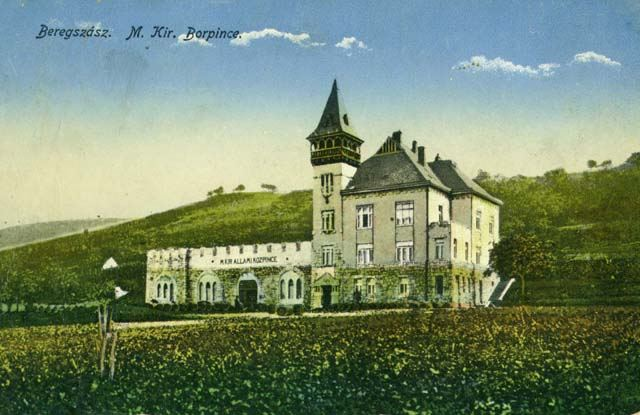
Schönborn Palace

== See also ==
- Great Synagogue, Berehove
