= Nicholas I Drugeth =

Hungarian nobleman

Nicholas (I) Drugeth
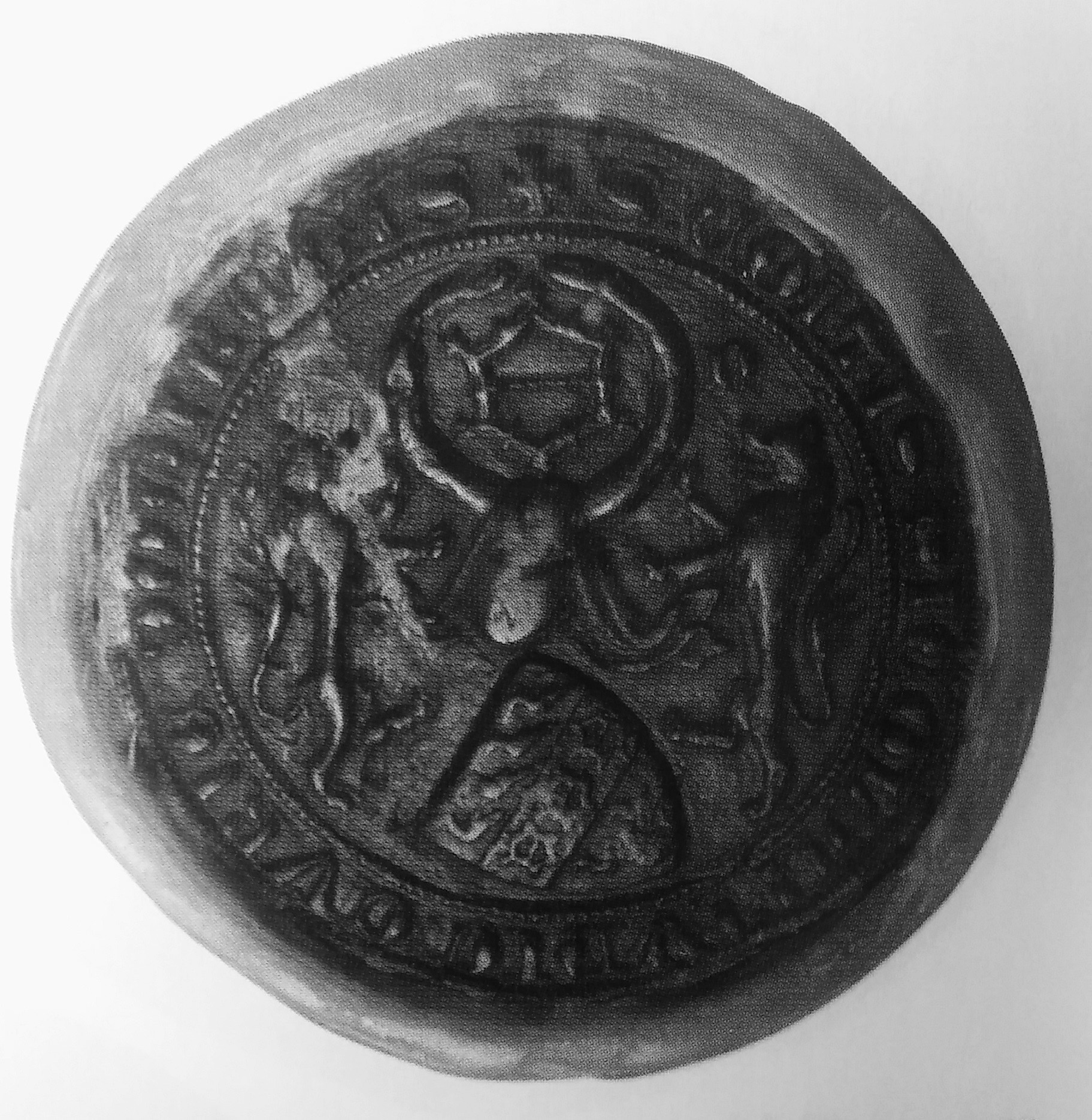
- Seal of Nicholas Drugeth, 1355

Judge royal
- Reign: 1354–1355
- Predecessor: Thomas Szécsényi
- Successor: Nicholas Szécsi
- Born: 1300s
- Died: May/June 1355
- Noble family: House of Drugeth
- Issue: John III; Ladislaus I
- Father: John I Drugeth
- Mother: Pasqua de Bononensi

Nicholas (I) Drugeth de Gerény (also Druget, Hungarian: gerényi Druget (I.) Miklós, Slovak: Mikuláš I. Druget Horiansky; 1300s – May or June 1355) was a Neapolitan-born Hungarian baron and military leader in the first half of the 14th century. As a member of the prestigious Drugeth family, he arrived in the Kingdom of Hungary along with his father and brothers upon the invitation of King Charles I at the turn of 1327 and 1328. Nicholas entered the service of the royal court as one of the tutors of princes Louis and Andrew. In this capacity, he protected boldly the children during Felician Záh's unsuccessful assassination attempt in 1330. Thereafter, Nicholas served as Master of the cupbearers.

Following the death of his older brother William without male heirs, Nicholas would have inherited his large wealth and power in Northeast Hungary in 1342, but as a result of court intrigues, the newly enthroned Louis I confiscated most of the inheritance. Nicholas and his younger brother John II were able to retain landholdings only in the mostly uninhabited, northeasternmost part of the kingdom, in Ung and Zemplén counties. Nevertheless, although politically marginalized, Nicholas did not lose his favor at the royal court. He participated in Louis' second Neapolitan campaign, becoming captain of the occupied Salerno in 1350. Returning Hungary, he was installed as Judge royal in 1354, but died in the next year. The Gerény branch of the Drugeth family descended from him, but this branch became extinct after two generations by the end of the 14th century. The Homonna branch, as the only surviving cadet branch descended from his younger brother.

== Tutor of the royal children ==
Although in these times the people of Hungary enjoyed the loved tranquility of peace and the kingdom was on all sides secure against its enemies, yet the hater of peace and the sower of envy, the devil, put into the heart of a certain soldier named Felicianus, of the line of Zaah, who was already advanced in years and his hair silvered, that he would in one day kill with his sword his lord King Charles and Queen Elizabeth, and the King's two sons Lays and Andreas. [...] In the year of our Lord 1330, on April 17, the Wednesday [sic] after the octave of Easter, the King was at dinner with the Queen and his sons in his residence before the castle of Vyssegrad, when Felicianus secretly entered and stood before the King's table. He drew his sharp sword from its scabbard and like a mad dog threw himself upon the King, the Queen and the sons in pitiless desire to kill them. But the pity of a pitiful God prevented him from executing his intent. Yet he slightly wounded the King in the right hand. But, alas, from the right hand of the most saintly Queen he severed four fingers which in her almsgiving she was wont to extend in pity to the poor, the wretched and the downcast. [...] Then he [Felicianus] tried to kill the royal princes who were present, but their tutors, Gyula de Kenesich's son [Nicholas Tapolcsányi] and Nicolaus, son of the Count Palatine Johannes [Nicholas Drugeth], placed themselves in his way and received mortal wounds in the head, but the boys were unhurt. Then Johannes, son of Alexander from the county of Potok [John Cselenfi], a youth of good disposition who was the Queen's second cup-bearer, threw himself upon Felicianus as upon a wild beast and struck at him with a dagger [bicellus] between the neck and the shoulder with such force that he felled him to the ground. Then from this side and that the King's soldiers rushed in and dispatched him as if he were some monster, severing the wretch's limbs with their terrible swords. [...]

— The Hungarian Illuminated Chronicle

Nicholas was born in the 1300s as the second son of John I Drugeth and Pasqua de Bononensi. The Drugeth family belonged to those Neapolitan elite of Ultramontane (French or Provençal) origin, who arrived to Apulia (Southern Italy) with Charles I of Anjou in 1266. By the first decade of the 14th century, brothers Philip and John – Nicholas' father – were considered as the most important members of the family. While John entered the service of Clementia, briefly Queen consort of France and Navarre. Philip joined the accompaniment of Clementia's brother Charles in the journey to Hungary, where laid claim to the throne and successfully acquired it by 1310. Nicholas had an elder brother William, and three much more younger siblings, John II, Philip II and Clementia. They grew up together in the queenly court of Clementia at Paris and Aix-en-Provence. Nicholas was certainly adult by 1324, when paid the papal tithes on behalf of the Saint Mary family chapel with the rank of a parish church, which located in the Drugeths' feudal estate in Pascarola.

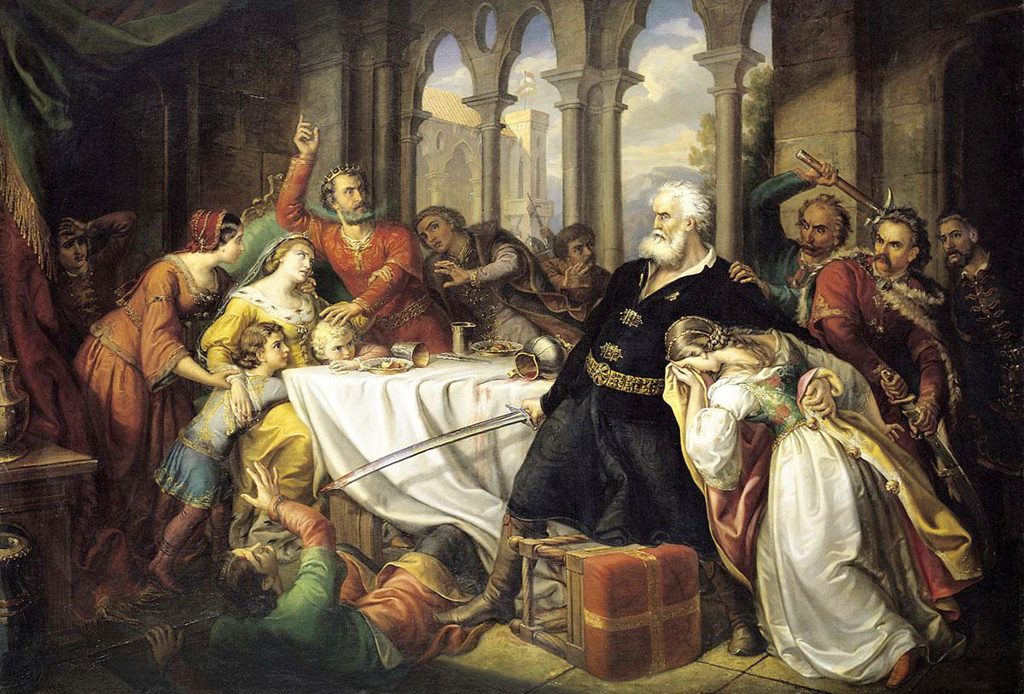
The assassination attempt of Felician Záh on the royal family in 1330, painted by Soma Orlai Petrich

John Drugeth and his family were invited from Naples to Hungary by King Charles I in order to inherit the wealth and power of Philip Drugeth, who lived in Hungary for decades as the king's most loyal comrade-in-arms, and by the time of his death (June or July 1327) he had risen to be one of the most influential barons. While John succeeded his brother as Palatine of Hungary, William, who was in his twenties, inherited his late uncle's wealth and large-scale province in Northeast Hungary, instantly becoming the richest and most powerful magnate in the Kingdom of Hungary. Nicholas also arrived to Hungary in 1327 or 1328. Along with Nicholas Tapolcsányi (or Knesich), Nicholas Drugeth became the tutor ("pedagogus") of the Hungarian princes Louis and Andrew, who were still small children at the time. Serbian historian Đura Hardi emphasizes, the service of engaging one of the Drugeths as tutor of their children by the Capetian House of Anjou looked back on a six-decade tradition. Both Nicholas Drugeth and Nicholas Tapolcsányi were present, when an enraged noble Felician Záh attempted to assassinate the entire royal family at dinner on 17 April 1330 in the royal palace of Visegrád. According to the narration of the near-contemporary Illuminated Chronicle, the two tutors managed to save the lives of the princes by placing themselves in Felician's way. Both Drugeth and Tapolcsányi received severe ("mortal") wounds in the head, but they both successfully recovered after the incident.

During a preparation of his military campaign to the Kingdom of Poland, the childless William Drugeth announced his last will and testament in Sáros Castle (present-day Šariš, Slovakia) on 9 August 1330, where he designated as the heir of all of his possessions his younger brother Nicholas, again under the principle of primogeniture (i.e. the youngest brother John II was excluded from the inheritance). Accordingly, Nicholas would have inherited eight castles – Szalánc (Slanec), Parics (near Trebišov), Barkó (Brekov), Jeszenő (Jasenov), Palocsa (Plaveč), Lubló (Stará Ľubovňa), Szokoly (Sokoľ) and Nedec or Dunajec (Niedzica) – with their benefits and accessories. The castles laid in the territory of the Drugeth Province in Northeast Hungary, in Szepes, Abaúj, Sáros and Zemplén counties, all but one of the castles are located in what is now Slovakia; Dunajec is located in Poland. In addition, Nicholas also became heir of some unidentified lands in Szatmár County and Újbécs ("New Vienna"), a settlement north of Pest. Micholas would inherit William's charters and documents, his entire stud, workstock, his guarantor horses and his weapons, under the conditions that he owes their sister Clementia 300 marks of fine silver from the income of the listed estates, to which he grants the customs duty of Lubló to their sister until full settlement. William also entrusted his personal servitor Walter to Nicholas that he may be accorded the same treatment as he enjoyed, and if he were to leave his service, he would be dismissed with a worthy payment.

Nicholas Drugeth was first styled as Master of the cupbearers by a contemporary charter in August 1332. Beside that, he also served as ispán of Ugocsa County from the same month. He held these offices until 1343 and 1342, respectively. Historians Ignaz Aurelius Fessler and István Miskolczy considered prince Andrew was accompanied by Nicholas to Naples in 1333–1334, where he was betrothed to his cousin Joanna, granddaughter and heiress apparent of King Robert of Naples. They argued, Nicholas, as tutor of the six-year-old Andrew, remained in Naples for a while. However, there is no source for that, as Đura Hardi emphasizes. Nicholas participated in the war against the Duchy of Austria in the summer of 1336. He was present at the siege of the fort of Kreisbach (near present-day Wilhelmsburg) in July.

== Confiscation of his heritage ==
Charles I died in Visegrád on 16 July 1342. His 16-year-old son Louis I ascended the Hungarian throne without resistance five days later. Although Louis had attained the age of majority, his mother Queen Elizabeth and her confidants – primarily, Thomas Szécsényi – exerted a powerful influence on him, which resulted the immediate political marginalization of William Drugeth. Two months after the death of Charles I, William also died in September 1342. Thereafter, his estates in Northeast Hungary ought to pass back to the Crown, as he had no any legitimate male heirs. Under the influence of Queen Elizabeth and Thomas Szécsényi – the "Polish party" –, Louis rejected William's last will and testament from 1330, and his younger brother Nicholas was not recognized as his heir. Instead of him, Nicholas Zsámboki was made Palatine of Hungary within weeks, who had held only insignificant positions before that (prior to this, three consecutive Drugeth family members filled the position – Philip, John I and William). The Hungarian barons were fed up with the Drugeths because, based on the experiences of the previous decades, they felt they can have only secondary roles compare to them. Louis, who already was born in Hungary, did not have an emotional dimension to the place of origin – Naples – of his family, as a result the Drugeth family no longer enjoyed this special attention. The idea that Nicholas Drugeth should be the next lord of the Drugeth Province was never seriously consider. After a brief power demand of Thomas Szécsényi, the semi-autuonomus province in Northeast Hungary was partitioned and disintegrated by early 1343.

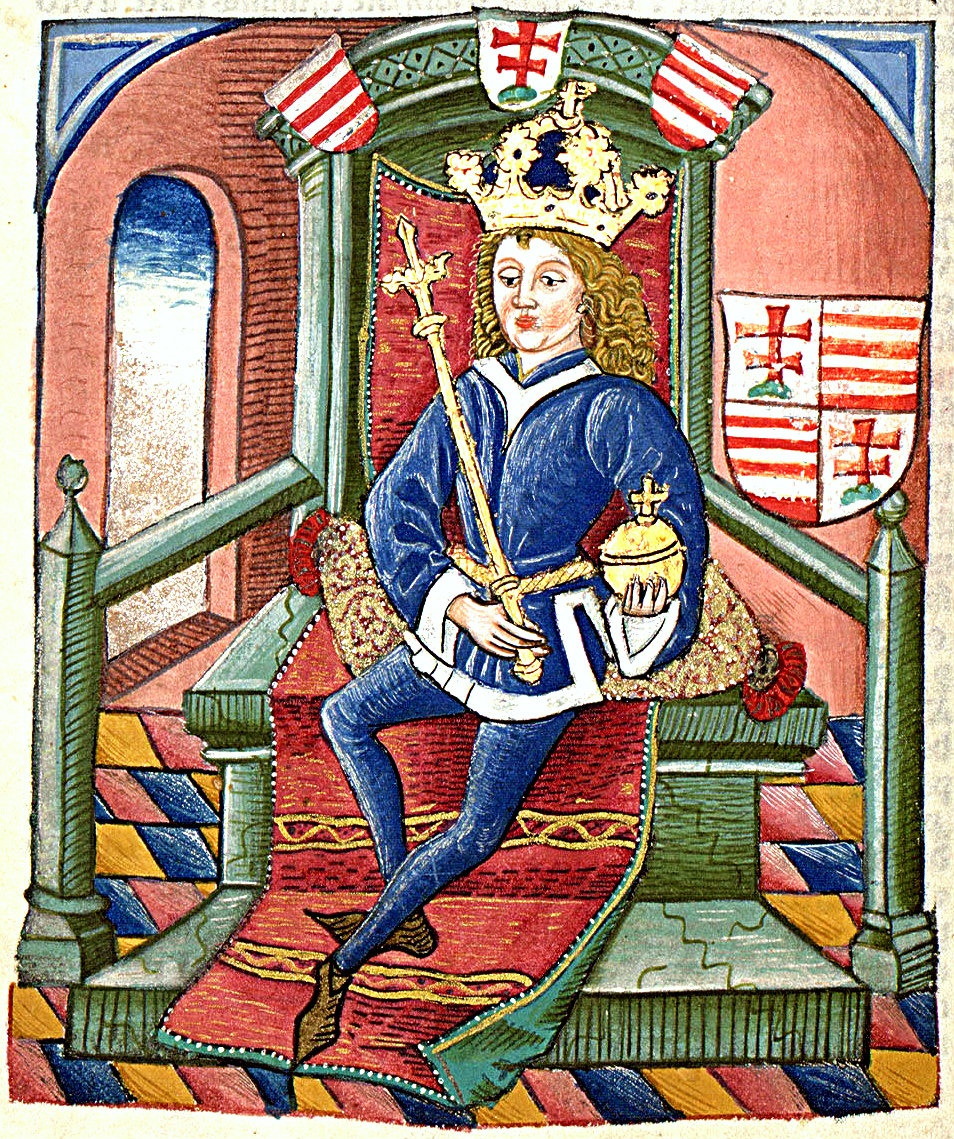
Louis I as depicted in the Chronica Hungarorum

Nicholas Drugeth was also dismissed from his courtly positions at the turn of 1342 and 1343. He was last styled as Master of the cupbearers in January 1343, while the governance of Ugocsa County was taken from him still in the autumn of 1342. The royal court also confiscated the vast majority of the Drugeths' private property. On 7 January 1343, a court hearing was held, where Nicholas and his younger brother John II submitted a charter in order to prove their right to William's heritage. As a result, the brothers were given back three castles – Barkó, Jeszenő and Nevicke (Nevytske, Ukraine) – out of the nine that they used to have, and they were virtually pushed back within the territory of Ung and Zemplén counties, a relatively uninhabited area at the northeast corner of the kingdom, while the regions rich with mines or on the trade routes between Poland and Central Hungary were irretrievably lost. Nicholas and John became the possessors of the Homonna lordship in Zemplén County, which consisted of 22 villages: Peticse (Ptičie), Kemence (Kamenica nad Cirochou), Szinna (Snina), Tavarna (Tovarné), Sztakcsin (Stakčínska Roztoka), Zubna (Zubné), Papfalva (Papín), Jankóc (Jankovce), Hankóc (Hankovce), Lácfalva (Lackovce), Hazsina (Hažín nad Cirochou), Homonna (Humenné), Porubka (Krajná Porúbka), Göröginye (Ohradzany), Kajna (Slovenská Kajňa), Lukasóc (Lukačovce), Holcsikóc (Holčíkovce), Pihnye (Pichne) Vadna, Tankafalva, Plempnafalva and Kepla (the last four villages are unidentified). They also owned Salamon (Solomonovo, Ukraine), Záhony and the village of Zemplén (today Zemplín, Slovakia) with its fair in the southeast part of the county. Nicholas and John inherited the villages of Nagykapos and Mocsár (present-day Veľké Kapušany and Močiar in Slovakia, respectively) in Ung County.

Nicholas served as ispán of Ung County from 1343 to 1354 – the last remaining position within the former political administration of the collapsing Drugeth Province. Local nobles joined and continued his service; for instance, his earliest vice-ispán was Dominic Csicseri. His former sister-in-law, Maria Follia – William's widow and a lady-in-waiting of Queen Elizabeth – further reduced his heritage: when she escorted her mistress to Naples, she exercised her alleged widow right to William's family estate in Naples, when she was granted a portion from Pascarola, the main feudal property of the Drugeths, by Queen Joanna in January 1344. Đura Hardi emphasizes Maria had no legal right to inherit the feudal estate, in comparison to her late husband's brothers, who did not receive an invitation to accompany Elizabeth on her journey to Naples. In the upcoming years, there were various lawsuits between the Drugeth brothers and the chapter of Lelesz (Leles), who claimed the ownership of Nagykapos for themselves.

== Return to the elite ==
Although politically marginalized, Nicholas Drugeth did not become disgraced at the royal court. Along with several other lords, he participated in the Neapolitan campaign of Louis in 1350. Consequently, Nicholas returned to his original homeland, the Kingdom of Naples after more than two decades. It is also conceivable that he had previously arrived to Southern Italy as a member of Stephen Lackfi's mercenaries, as his name becomes rare in domestic sources after 1347 and does not appear at all in contemporary documents as an active actor. After the Hungarian monarch launched his second campaign in April 1350, the Hungarian army, which arrived via the Adriatic Sea, marched towards Naples in the following months. The city of Salerno was besieged and occupied on 27 June 1350. After Louis decided to return Hungary following the capture of Aversa, he appointed Andrew Lackfi as the governor of Apulia, while Nicholas Drugeth and Fra Moriale were installed as military captain of Salerno and Aversa, respectively. Their troops successfully fought against Louis of Taranto. Đura Hardi considers Nicholas took advantage of his personal military presence, and visited the feudal estate of Pascarola in order to "persuade" the vassals and subjects there to be faithful again. This land was the last point of connection for the Drugeth family to the old homeland. Hungary, meanwhile, became their new home, despite the losses of 1342, which was richer and more spacious than Pascarola.

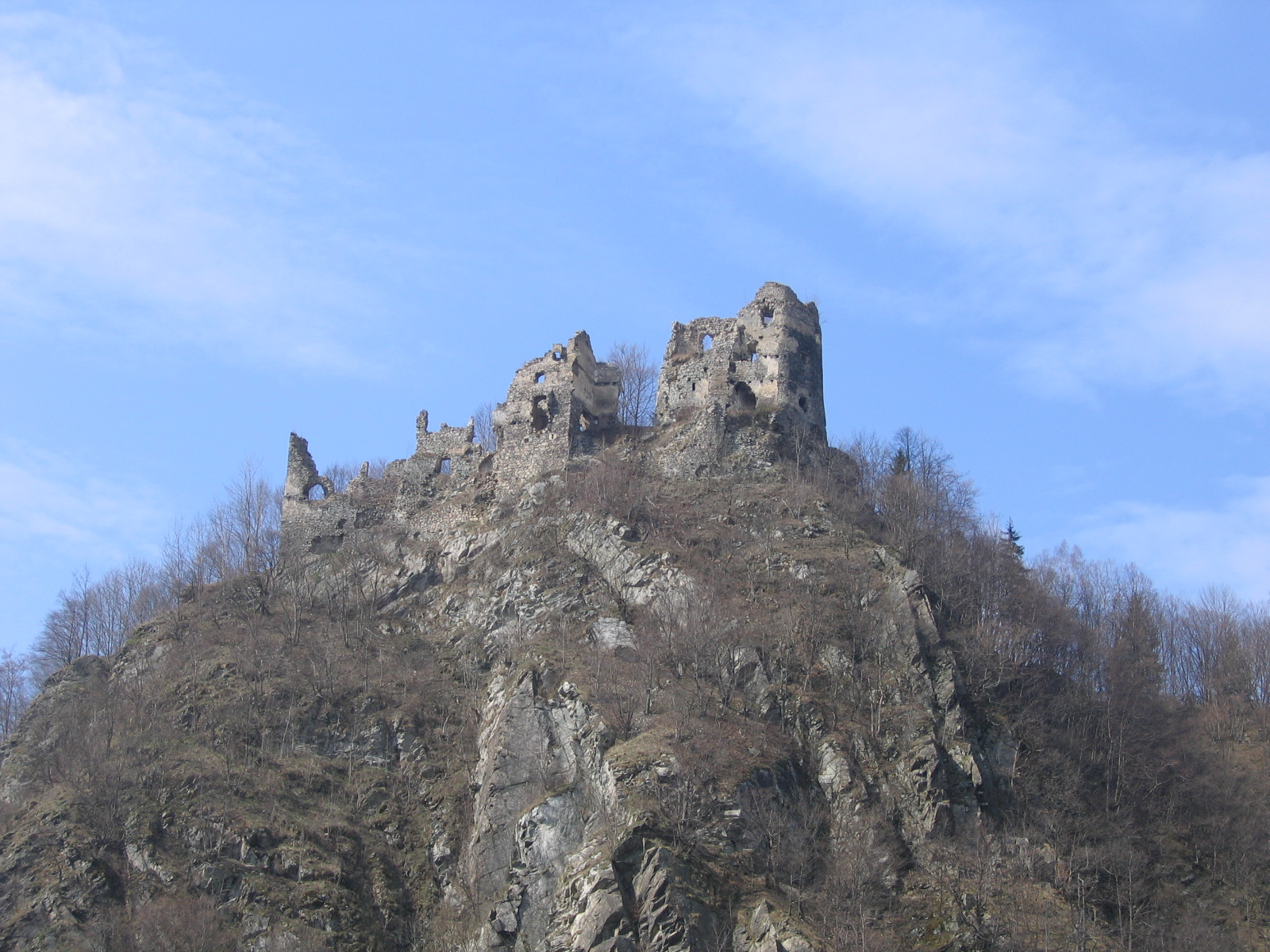
The castle of Starhrad (Óvár), near Nezbudská Lúčka, belonged to Nicholas Drugeth's income, when holding the dignity Judge royal from 1354 to 1355

Louis and Joanna signed a peace treaty in March 1352. Joanna and her husband, Louis of Taranto returned to the Kingdom of Naples and Louis' troops were withdrawn. Nicholas Drugeth also returned to Hungary either in 1352 or 1353. He resided in the kingdom by April 1353. As a reward for his participation in the Neapolitan campaign, the Hungarian monarch confirmed his legitimate ownership over Újlak (Novosad) in Zemplén County and assured him that he will grant Nádasd (Trstené pri Hornáde) in Abaúj County after the death of Maria Follia, who possessed the village for the rest of her life. In November 1353, Nicholas and his brother, John were granted the "right of the sword" (Latin: ius gladii) over their landholdings by King Louis. Following the death of Thomas Szécsényi, Nicholas was appointed Judge royal – the second most prestigious secular position in the kingdom – in April 1354. Beside that, he also served as ispán of Turóc County. As a result, his brother, John succeeded him as ispán of Ung County in that year. Nicholas inherited several lawsuits from his predecessor. The royal castle of Óvár in Trencsén County (today Starhrad near Nezbudská Lúčka) belonged to his honor ("office fief"). He donated a nearby accessory land called Katazna to one of his familiares, Bohus, son of Dezlou with the approval of the king.

The return of the Drugeths to the national elite and power proved to be only temporary; Nicholas died barely a year later, in May or June 1355. Nicholas had two sons from his unidentified wife, John III and Ladislaus I. They remained local – albeit, prominent – nobles in Ung County without national political significance. Sometime after 1343, Nicholas moved his permanent residence to Gerény (present-day Horjani, a borough of Uzhhorod). He built a fortified mansion there. The Gerény (or Geren) branch of the Drugeth family descended from him, but this branch became extinct after two generations by the end of the 14th century. After a possible division of the heritage, Nicholas' brother, John II administered the family estates in Zemplén County. The Homonna branch of the family, descended from him, continued to exist until 1684, as the only surviving cadet branch of the Drugeth family.

== Sources ==
=== Primary sources ===
- The Hungarian Illuminated Chronicle: Chronica de Gestis Hungarorum (Edited by Dezső Dercsényi) (1970). Corvina, Taplinger Publishing. ISBN 0-8008-4015-1.

=== Secondary studies ===
- Bertényi, Iván (1976). Az országbírói intézmény története a XIV. században [History of the Institution of Judge Royal in the 14th Century] (in Hungarian). Hungarian Academy of Sciences. ISBN 963-05-0734-X.
- Engel, Pál (1996). Magyarország világi archontológiája, 1301–1457, I. [Secular Archontology of Hungary, 1301–1457, Volume I] (in Hungarian). História, MTA Történettudományi Intézete. ISBN 963-8312-44-0.
- Hardi, Đura (2012). Drugeti. Povest o usponu i padu porodice pratilaca Anžujskih kraljeva [Drugeths. The History of the Rise and Decline of the Escorts of Angevin Kings] (in Serbo-Croatian (Latin script)). Faculty of Philosophy, University of Novi Sad. ISBN 978-86-6065-108-4.
- Kristó, Gyula (1988). Az Anjou-kor háborúi [Wars in the Age of the Angevins] (in Hungarian). Zrínyi Kiadó. ISBN 963-326-905-9.
- Markó, László (2006). A magyar állam főméltóságai Szent Istvántól napjainkig: Életrajzi Lexikon [Great Officers of State in Hungary from King Saint Stephen to Our Days: A Biographical Encyclopedia] (in Hungarian). Helikon Kiadó. ISBN 963-208-970-7.
- Zsoldos, Attila (2017). A Druget-tartomány története 1315–1342 [The History of the Druget Province 1315–1342] (in Hungarian). MTA Bölcsészettudományi Kutatóközpont Történettudományi Intézete. ISBN 978-963-4160-63-2.

Nicholas I House of Drugeth Born: 1300s Died: May/June 1355
Political offices
Preceded by Gregory Domoszlói	Master of the cupbearers 1332–1343	Succeeded by Nicholas Kont
Preceded by Thomas Szécsényi	Judge royal 1354–1355	Succeeded by Nicholas Szécsi
