= Philip Drugeth =

Neapolitan knight of French origin

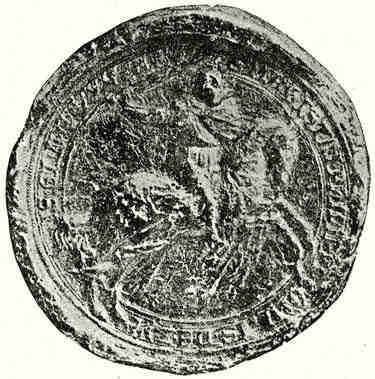
- Seal of Philip Drugeth (1324)

Palatine of Hungary
- Reign: 1323–1327
- Predecessor: Dózsa Debreceni
- Successor: John Drugeth
- Born: c. 1288
- Died: June/July 1327
- Buried: Székesfehérvár Basilica
- Noble family: House of Drugeth
- Spouse: Margaret N
- Issue: Clara; Margaret
- Father: Johannes de Trogect
- Mother: Isabella N

Philip Drugeth (also Druget, Hungarian: Druget Fülöp, Slovak: Filip Druget, Ukrainian: Філіпп Другет; c. 1288 – June or July 1327) was a Neapolitan knight of French origin, who accompanied the twelve-year-old pretender Charles of Anjou to Hungary in 1300. After Charles I defeated his enemies in the struggle for the throne, Drugeth gained large-scale domains and held various ispánates in the northeastern parts of the kingdom, establishing there a semi-autonomous province. Drugeth integrated into the Hungarian nobility and is considered the founder of the powerful Drugeth family, which overwhelmingly dominated the royal court until the 1340s, but also continued to be important until the male line died out in the 17th century.

Drugeth served as Treasurer of the Queen's Court from 1321 to 1323, then Palatine of Hungary from 1323 until his death. As he had no surviving male descendants, his older brother John arrived from Naples to succeed him as Palatine, while his nephew William inherited his province.

== Ancestry and early life ==
Magister Philip of Apulia left behind his homeland and kinship, did not care at all about his whole fortune and paternal heritage since, when we were young, he came with us to Hungary, which belongs us by the right of origin, he has not leave our allegiance until now, and even in our manhood, during our unfortunate and auspicious years, he took on the tasks with us and solved them. [...]

— Charles I's royal charter of 3 November 1317 to Philip Drugeth

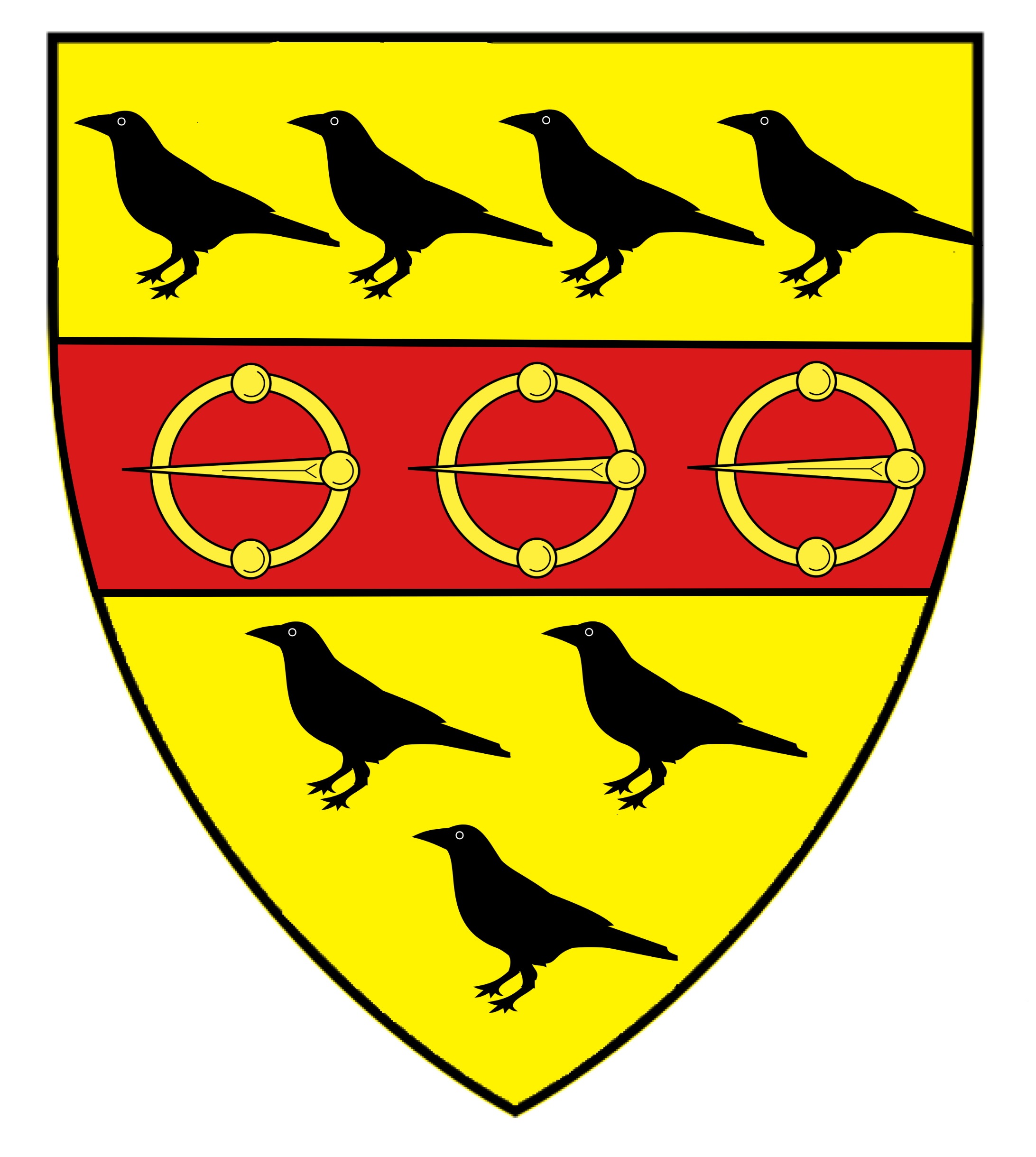
Coat-of-arms of the Drugeth family

Philip Drugeth was born into a Neapolitan noble family, which originated from the Kingdom of France. They belonged to those Italian elite of Ultramontane (French or Provençal) origin, who arrived to Apulia (Southern Italy) with Charles I of Anjou – brother of Louis IX of France –, who conquered the Kingdom of Sicily in 1266. Drugeth was the younger son of John Drugeth (Latin: Johannes de Trogect) and a certain Isabella from an unidentified family. According to the narration of Charles I of Hungary, Drugeth and the king were about the same age, consequently he was born around 1288. His elder brother John was a year or two older than him. They also had a sister Matilda. They were all still minors at the turn of the 13th and 14th centuries, because their names appeared in diminutive forms in a single document around 1300 ("Joannoctus, Filippoctus et Matchtilda Drugetii"). According to Charles, Drugeth also had military training, it is possible he was already trained as a squire or knight at the time of his arrival to Hungary.

The parents John and Isabella were granted fiefdoms in Naples. John was referred to as a royal valet in the court of Charles II of Naples. Both John and Isabella died by the middle of the 1290s. John's elder brother (or father?), Nicholas and his wife Isabella de La Forêt adopted and took over the care of the children, who became their immediate heirs too. Nicholas served as Lord Steward for Charles Martel's wife Clementia from 1292 to 1295. Both died of the plague in Naples. In 1298, Nicholas was mentioned as tutor of the children of the late Charles Martel – i.e. Charles (the future King of Hungary), Clementia and Beatrice. Consequently, Nicholas' nephews John and Philip were raised together with Charles in the royal court, where they cherished their lifelong friendship and alliance. While John entered the service of Clementia (later Queen consort of France for a short time), the younger brother Philip belonged to the escort of Charles, who would have been the lawful heir to his grandfather Charles II. However, the king excluded the child Charles from succeeding the throne in the Kingdom of Naples, when declared his third son Robert as his heir. Instead of this, Charles was sent to Hungary in order to claim the throne in 1300, and the child Philip escorted him to the kingdom.

== Struggle for Charles ==
Upon the invitation of several Hungarian lords, who turned against Andrew III of Hungary, the young Charles and his accompaniment landed at Split in Dalmatia in August 1300. They arrived with only two galleys, a carrier ship and 150 horses, which reflected the very low number of his escort, consisting of Italian and French knights. Among them, only Philip Drugeth took a significant role in the subsequent unification war against the oligarchic domains and the governance of the realm. By the arrival of Charles, the young pretender's political situation had drastically worsened, because Andrew III reconciled with the most powerful oligarchs, including Matthew Csák and Henry Kőszegi. Even after Andrew's death and the extinction of the Árpád dynasty in January 1301, the overwhelming majority of the barons supported the claim of Wenceslaus of Přemyslid, Charles' rival. The struggle for the Hungarian throne during the so-called Interregnum characterized the next decade. There is no information about any of Drugeth's activity in this period, who has reached adulthood during these years. According to Serbian historian Đura Hardi, Drugeth became acquainted with his new homeland, the temper and customs of the provincial lords against whom he was soon going to fight, after Charles became the lawful and only King of Hungary after his third coronation in 1310.

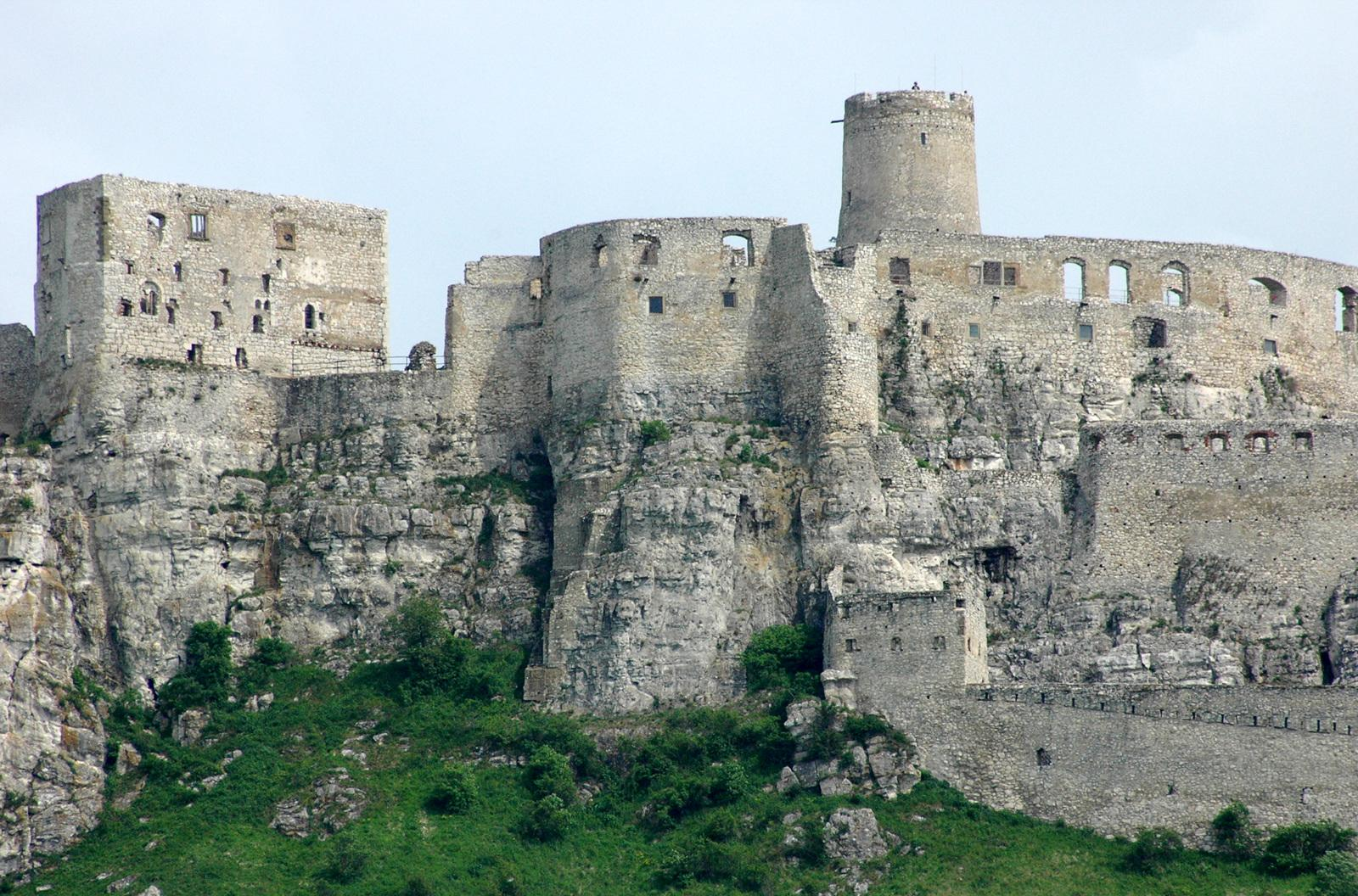
Philip Drugeth elevated into the Hungarian nobility, when he was appointed castellan of Szepes Castle (today in Spišské Podhradie, Slovakia) in 1315

The burghers of Kassa (now Košice in Slovakia) assassinated the oligarch Amadeus Aba in September 1311. After that Charles I was committed to eradicating the Abas' oligarchic rule. However, Amadeus' sons rebelled against the king. Following a series of military skirmishes in the spring of 1312, the young Philip Drugeth participated in the siege of Sáros Castle (today Šariš in Slovakia) in late April or early May 1312, when Charles' army seized the fort from the Aba-ally Zólyom (Balassa) kinship. During the siege, Drugeth distinguished himself and had received two "deathly wounds". Thereafter Charles waged war against Matthew Csák in order to "recovering of occupied royal property" in early 1313, capturing Nagyszombat. Drugeth participated in this campaign. By that time, he was one of the chief commanders of the royal army. It is possible, however, the royal charter of 1317, which narrates the merits of Philip, refers to the failed military expedition against Matthew Csák in September 1311.

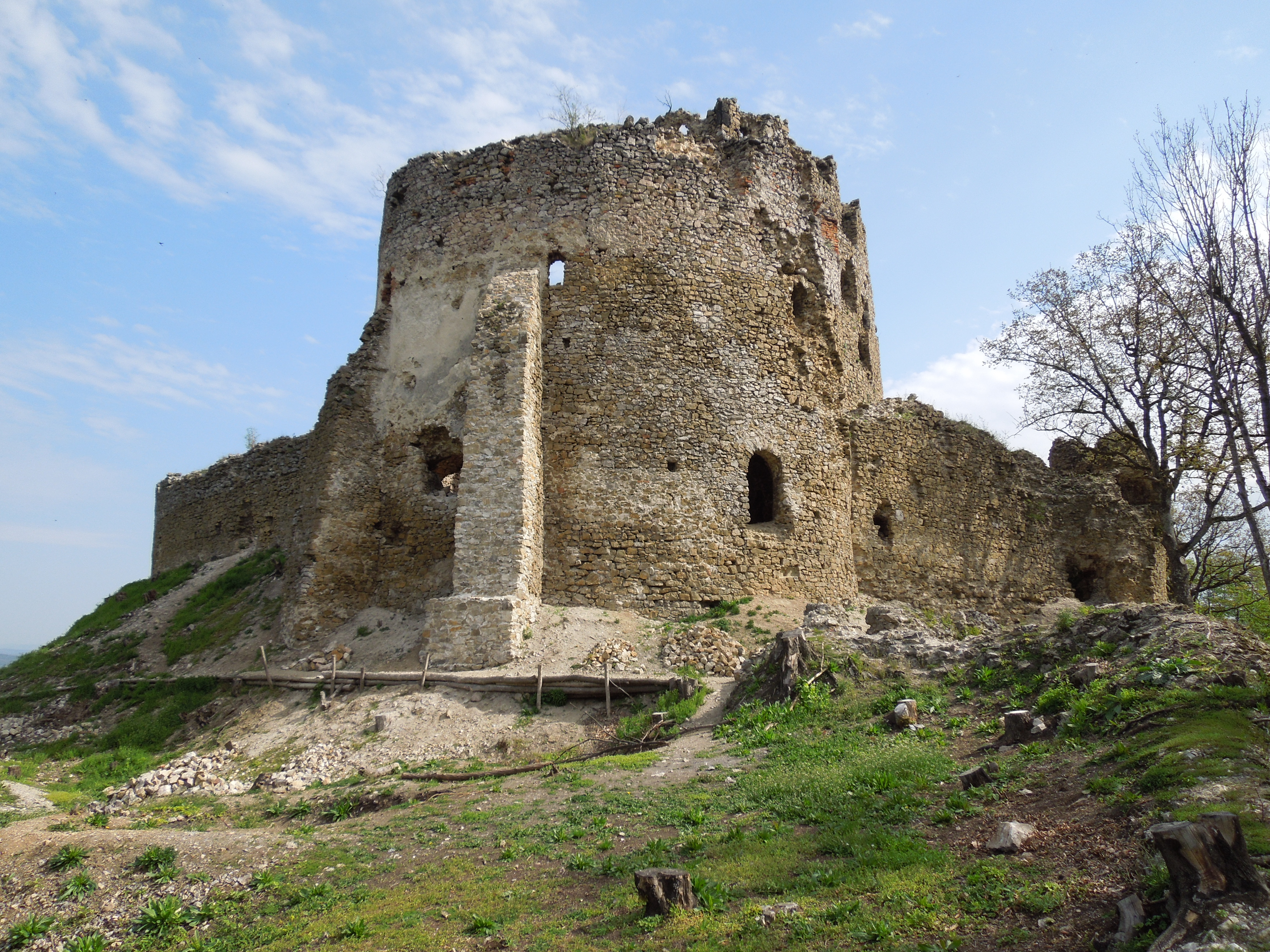
The ruins of Jasenov (Jeszenő) Castle, which was captured by Philip Drugeth in 1317

Charles' aforementioned charter also refers to another clash between Philip Drugeth and Matthew Csák in the area of "Scepus". Accordingly, the oligarch invaded the land in order to loot and destroy the royal landholdings, but Drugeth won a "glorious victory" and successfully repulsed his army. Historian Gyula Kristó argued Matthew's attack occurred at the turn of 1314 and 1315, and identified with the place with the region of Szepesség (or Zips, today Spiš, Slovakia). In fact, Matthew Csák, who plundered the region, was narrowly defeated by the royal army. During the decisive battle, Drugeth was almost captured, his arm was severely wounded and his life was saved by one of his familiares Nicholas Tekele. In contrast, historian Pál Engel identified "Scepus" with the town of Szepsi (today Moldava nad Bodvou, Slovakia) and dated the clash to the first half of 1317. Philip Drugeth was first styled as ispán of Szepes County and castellan of its namesake castle in March 1315 (his initial main residence). Pál Engel argued Charles resided in the Szepesség region in late 1314 and dismissed his former loyal barons, the brothers Kakas and Henry Tarkői from their positions in Szepes and Sáros counties, respectively. Following that Charles appointed Philip Drugeth and Mikcs Ákos as the new heads of the aforementioned counties. In contrast, Kristó considered Charles arrived to the region to strengthen his royalist faction in Northeast Hungary, and there is no record of any military activities in the region in that year. Kristó argued Drugeth fought against Matthew Csák, when he was already ispán. Drugeth held both offices until his death. With this appointment, he became one of the barons of the realm, granting his first landholdings and "office fiefs" (or honors). He is considered founder and first member of the Drugeth de Homonna family, which had integrated into the Hungarian nobility.

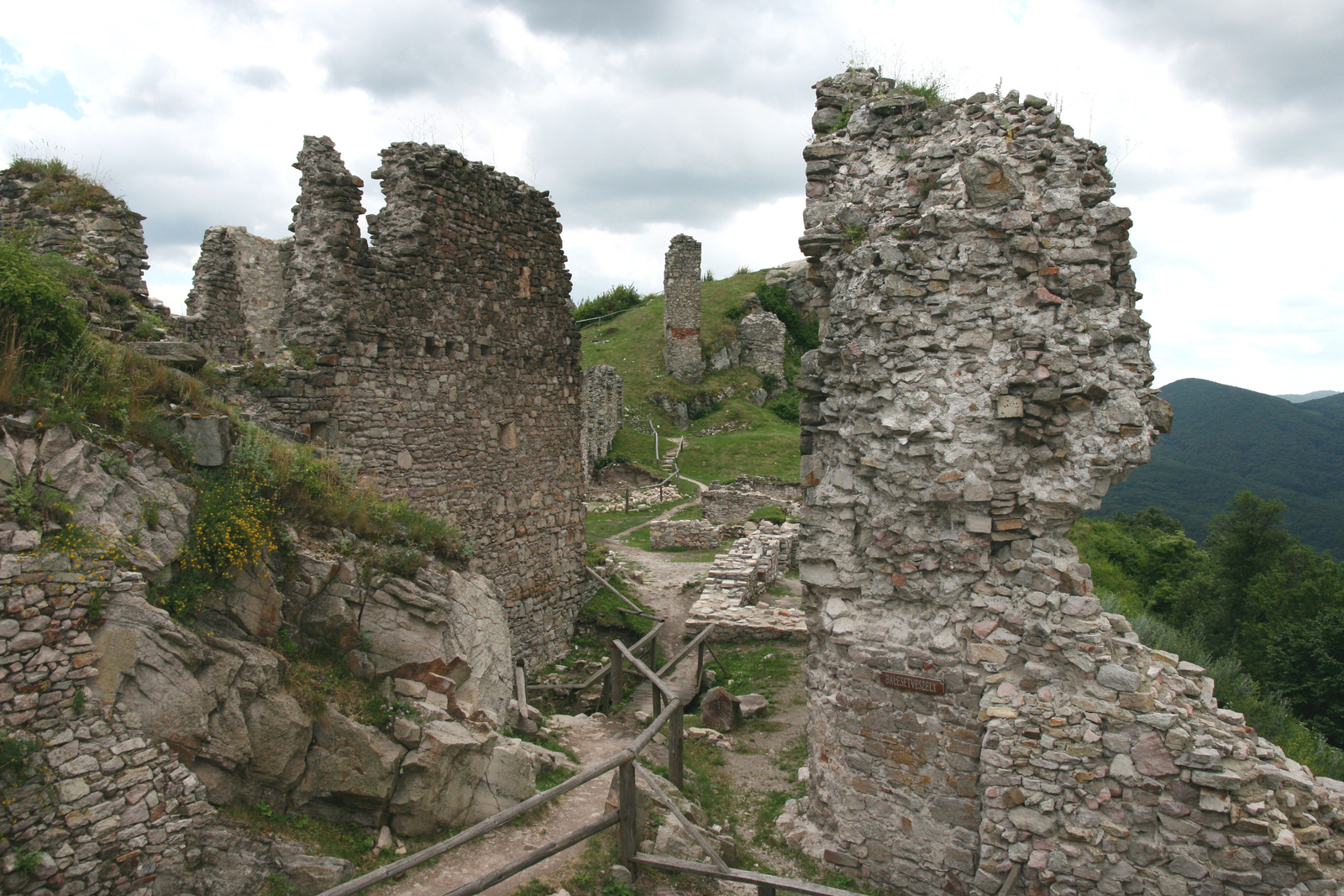
The ruins of Regéc Castle, which was captured by Philip Drugeth in 1317

The influential Borsa clan, in alliance with Peter, son of Petenye rebelled against Charles I in the second half of 1316. Peter – initially a loyal soldier of the king – rose to prominence in Northeast Hungary, exploiting that political vacuum, which emerged following the dissolution of the Abas' dominion. In response, Charles appointed Philip Drugeth as ispán of Abaúj County (or Újvár) in late 1316, replacing John Aba, who could not hinder Peter's rapid expansion in the region. In contemporary documents, Drugeth first appeared as head of the county in March 1317. Charles immediately responded to the unfavorable developments and launched a multi-faceted war against James Borsa and his allies in early 1317. The king initiated a royal campaign first against Peter, the weakest member of the anti-Charles coalition. Philip Drugeth and Mikcs Ákos simultaneously led troops against Peter's forts in Ung County in the first months of 1317. Around March, Drugeth captured Gönc, then his army marched in front of Regéc Castle, also joined by Ladislaus Baksa's auxiliary troops due to a threatening leaf by Drugeth. Regéc was besieged and seized in April. In the same time, Mikcs Ákos crushed Peter's power in Zemplén County, capturing the castles Barkó (Brekov), Borostyán and Bodrogszög (Klin nad Bodrogom) within few weeks. Peter's last stronghold Jeszenő (Jasenov) was taken by Philip Drugeth in the last days of April or early May 1317 (according to Engel, Matthew Csák's surprise attack against Szepsi also occurred around that time). Attila Zsoldos proposes Drugeth took the title ispán of Zemplén County after Peter's defeat, holding the dignity until 1320, potentially in parallel with his local rival, Ladislaus Baksa. Drugeth was present in the royal camp, when Charles invaded Matthew Csák's domains and captured Visegrád and Komárom (now Komárno in Slovakia) in the autumn of 1317. The sons of the late Amadeus Aba rebelled against the king again in late 1317, because their political and social status has declined against the emerging new nobility in the region, including Philip Drugeth and Mikcs Ákos, who were sent to crush their rebellion. Drugeth captured their forts at Boldogkő and their possessions in Sáros County.

Philip Drugeth participated in the military expedition against Serbian king Stefan Milutin in the summer of 1319, during which Charles retook Belgrade and restored the Banate of Macsó. Thereafter, Dózsa Debreceni and Drugeth eliminated the power of the sons of the late oligarch Stephen Ákos in Borsod and Gömör counties since the autumn of 1319. Drugeth besieged and captured their castle at Dédes. The war against the Ákos sons continued until the next year. Around August, Dózsa and Drugeth seized another forts in Heves, Gömör and Nógrád counties. Drugeth was present at the sieges of Sirok and Fülek (today Fiľakovo, Slovakia). Drugeth was made ispán of Gömör and Torna counties in 1320, holding both offices until his death. It is plausible that he also became ispán of Borsod and Heves counties around that time. After Matthew Csák died in March 1321, the royal army invaded the deceased lord's province, which soon disintegrated because most of his former castellans yielded without resistance. Drugeth's troops joined the royal army in late April. Drugeth and his several familiares – including Nicholas Perényi and Blaise Fonyi – participated in the sieges of the castles of Tapolcsány and Trencsén (now Topoľčany and Trenčín in Slovakia, respectively).

== Formation of the Drugeth Province ==
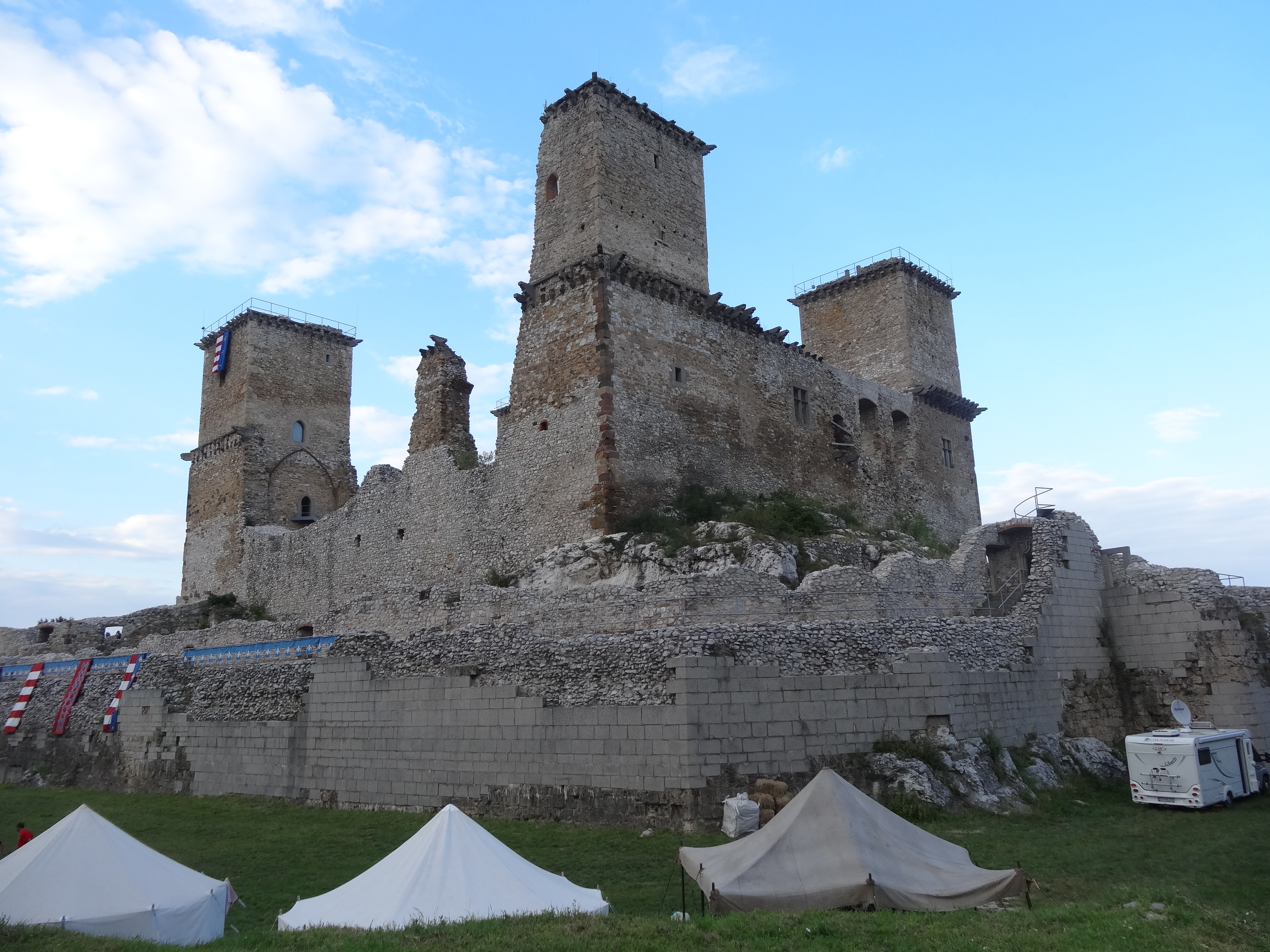
Castle of Diósgyőr, an important stronghold in Borsod County, part of Philip Drugeth's "office fief" (honor)

By the beginning of the 14th century, a political tradition had emerged that holders of the major royal dignities (barons) also governed one or more counties as ispán at the same time. However, among them, geographically well defined group of counties were permanently assigned only to the jurisdiction of the Voivode of Transylvania, the Ban of Slavonia and later the Ban of Macsó. In Northeast Hungary, where Philip Drugeth gradually expanded his influence by acquiring personal landholdings and gaining positions (ispánates), there was no a separate administrative unit (province). By 1320, Drugeth served as representative of the royal power in Szepes, Abaúj, Borsod, Gömör, Torna and Heves counties, holding the title ispán in these territories. As "office fiefs" (or honors), which secured the income of his offices, Drugeth also acted as castellan of the royal castles Szepes in Szepes County, Füzér, Regéc, Gönc, Boldogkő, Jászó (Jasov), Somodi (Drienovec) in Abaúj County, Dédes and Diósgyőr (after 1323) in Borsod County and Szádvár in Torna County. Previously, these forts belonged to the oligarchic provinces of Amadeus Aba, Stephen Ákos and Peter, son of Petenye and their families, which were defeated one after another by 1320. Beyond the six counties, Drugeth was also granted honors, for instance the castle of Fülek (Fiľakovo) in Nógrád County, close to the southwestern part of his province. In Sáros County, which did not belong to his province, Drugeth also became castellan of Makovica (Zborov) and Szokoly (Sokoľ). In the latter case, former historiography incorrectly claimed that Drugeth possessed Szokoly in a hereditary right. Sometime between 1328 and 1330, Drugeth's heir William was indeed granted the fort by the monarch, becoming a Drugeth property. There were also opposite phenomena regarding the honors. For instance, despite Drugeth functioning as ispán of Heves County, which was part of his province, its only castle Sirok was guarded by royal castellan Emeric Visontai in the name of the king. With these honors associated with his county positions, the Drugeth Province began to take shape in Northeast Hungary, comparable with Transylvania and Slavonia both in its size and its institutions. Drugeth moved his provincial seat (residence) in Újvár in Abaúj County in 1320.

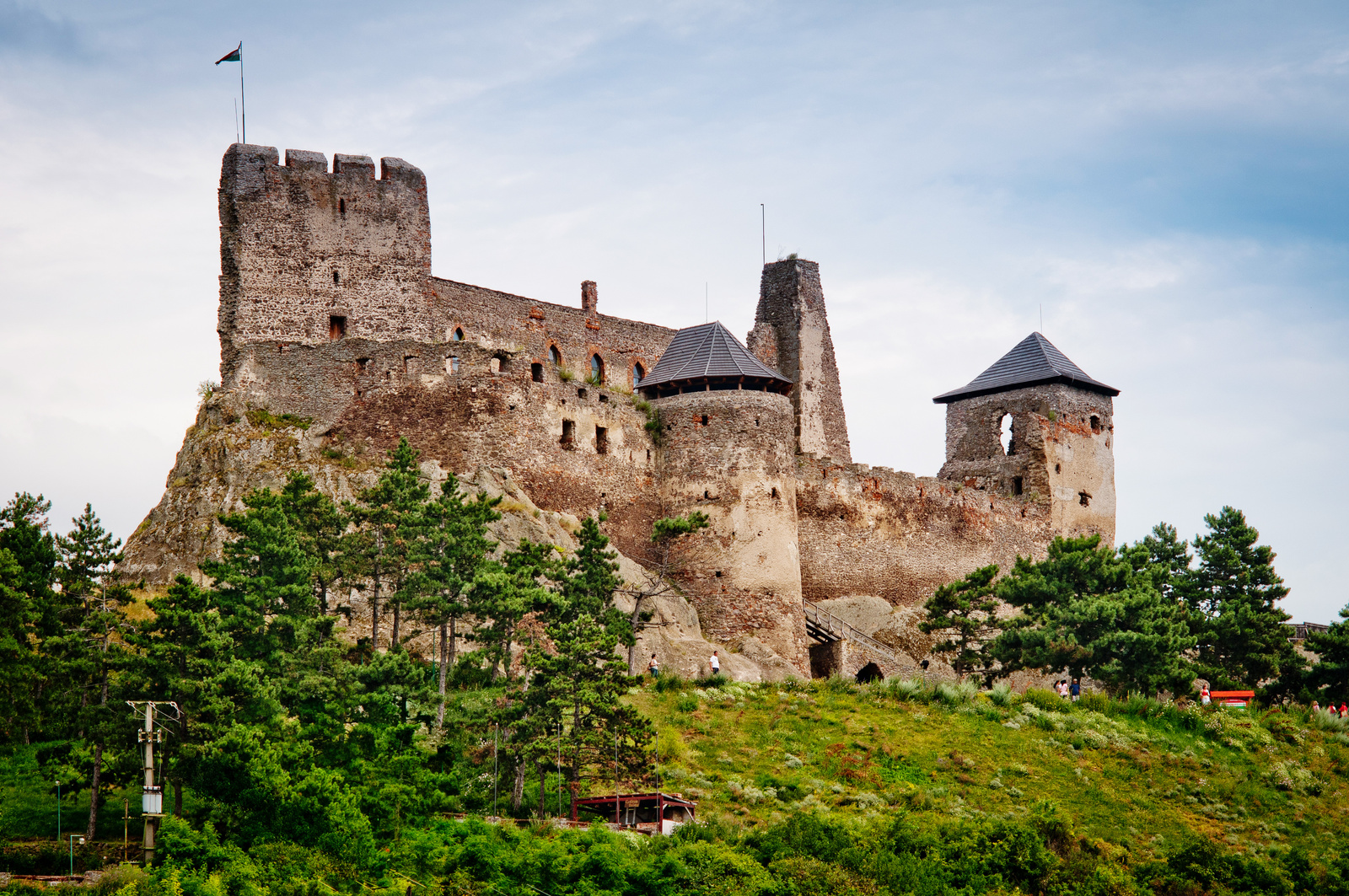
The castle of Boldogkő, seized by Drugeth from the Clan Aba in 1317. Thereafter, the fort became part of his honor ("office fief)

The close relationship among the counties, of which the province was composed, was initiated by an institution, a peculiar office that first appeared in the 1310s, simultaneously with the restoration of the royal power. It did not have a permanent name, it was usually referred to as "the judge appointed by the king" (Latin: iudex a domino rege deputatus), while modern historiography refers to them as "royal judge" (Hungarian: királybíró); not to be confused with the dignity Judge royal). These ispáns, who were called royal judges received extra power and have been given the authority of the position of Palatine in their respected territories. This proved to be a temporary solution until Charles consolidated his rule over Hungary by 1323. The institution of "royal judge" only subsisted permanently in the case of the Banate of Macsó and the Drugeth Province. When Drugeth was appointed Palatine in 1323, he abandoned that title (effectively, his existing palatinal authority in his province were extended to the entire territory of the country), however when William inherited his province, he was also styled as royal judge until his own installment as Palatine in 1334. Zsoldos argues the formation of a separate pro-royal province in Northeast Hungary was established in order to counterbalance and isolate the expansionist policy of Matthew Csák, the king's most ardent enemy during the unification war. When another royal judge Dózsa Debreceni died suddenly in late 1322, Drugeth took over his counties of Szabolcs, Szatmár and Bereg as an "empty honor", while Thomas Szécsényi governed the remaining two counties, Szolnok and Kraszna.

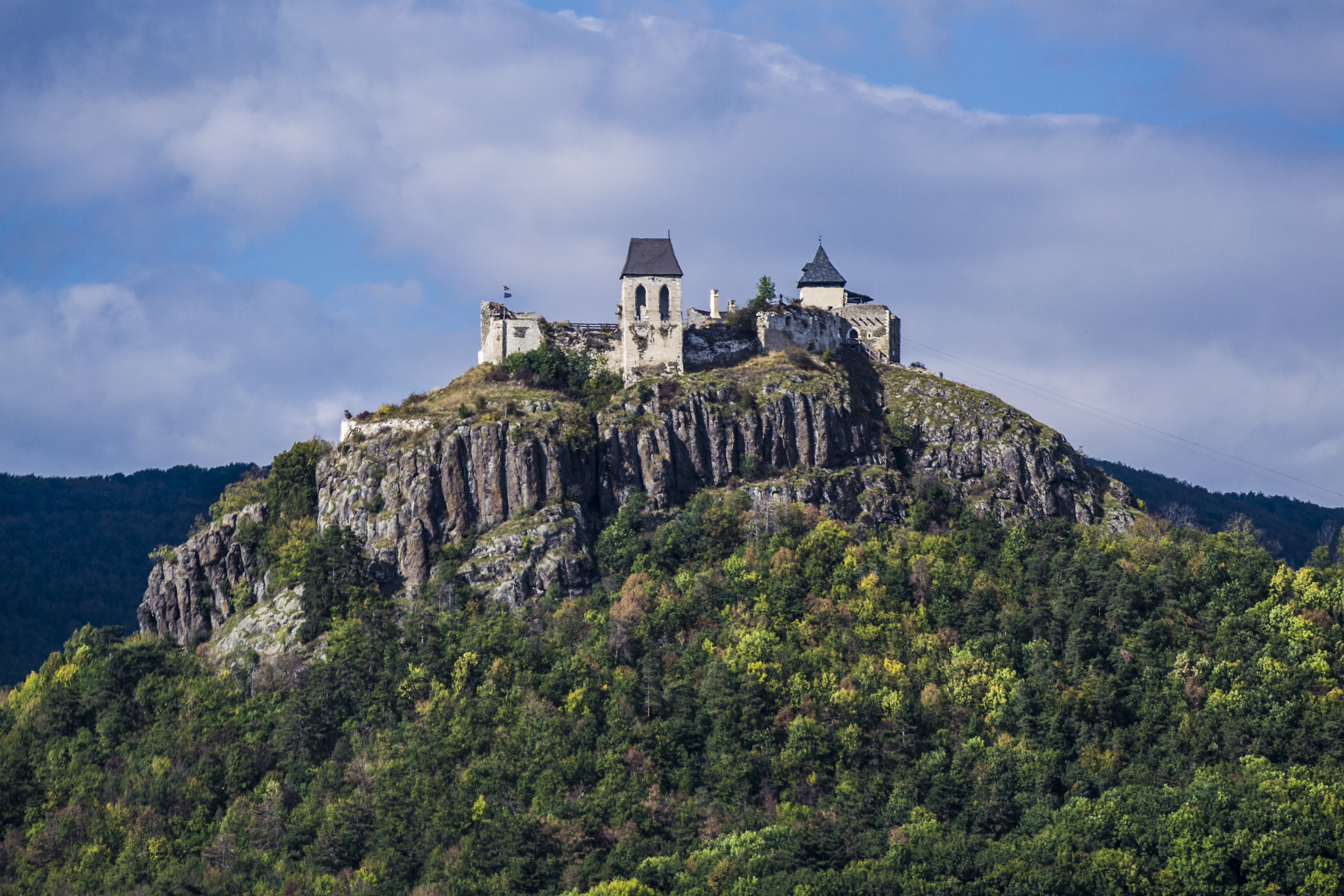
The royal castle of Füzér, an important fort in Drugeth province

The formation of the Drugeth Province did not affect the county level administration. Each county was linked to a royal castle, which number increased as the province was expanding. Drugeth followed the same government practices as other barons of the realm; although he functioned as ispán of the aforementioned counties, the practical duties of county government were attended to by his local deputies, the vice-ispáns and (vice-)castellans, who were belonged to his familia. In provincial level, Drugeth had two known officials: the treasurer of the province (Latin: magister tavernicarum) managed his revenues, while the judge of the Court of Vizsoly served Drugeth in the field of justice. Drugeth also had to cooperate with privileged groups in his territory, the Zipser Germans and the ten-lanced nobles. However, Charles I did not give any settlement full municipal privileges in the territory of the Drugeth Province, because of the maximization of the royal income. Drugeth made an unsuccessful attempt to acquire the lordship of Lónya in Bereg County to annex it to his province, falsely claiming that it formerly belonged to the accessories of Füzér Castle.

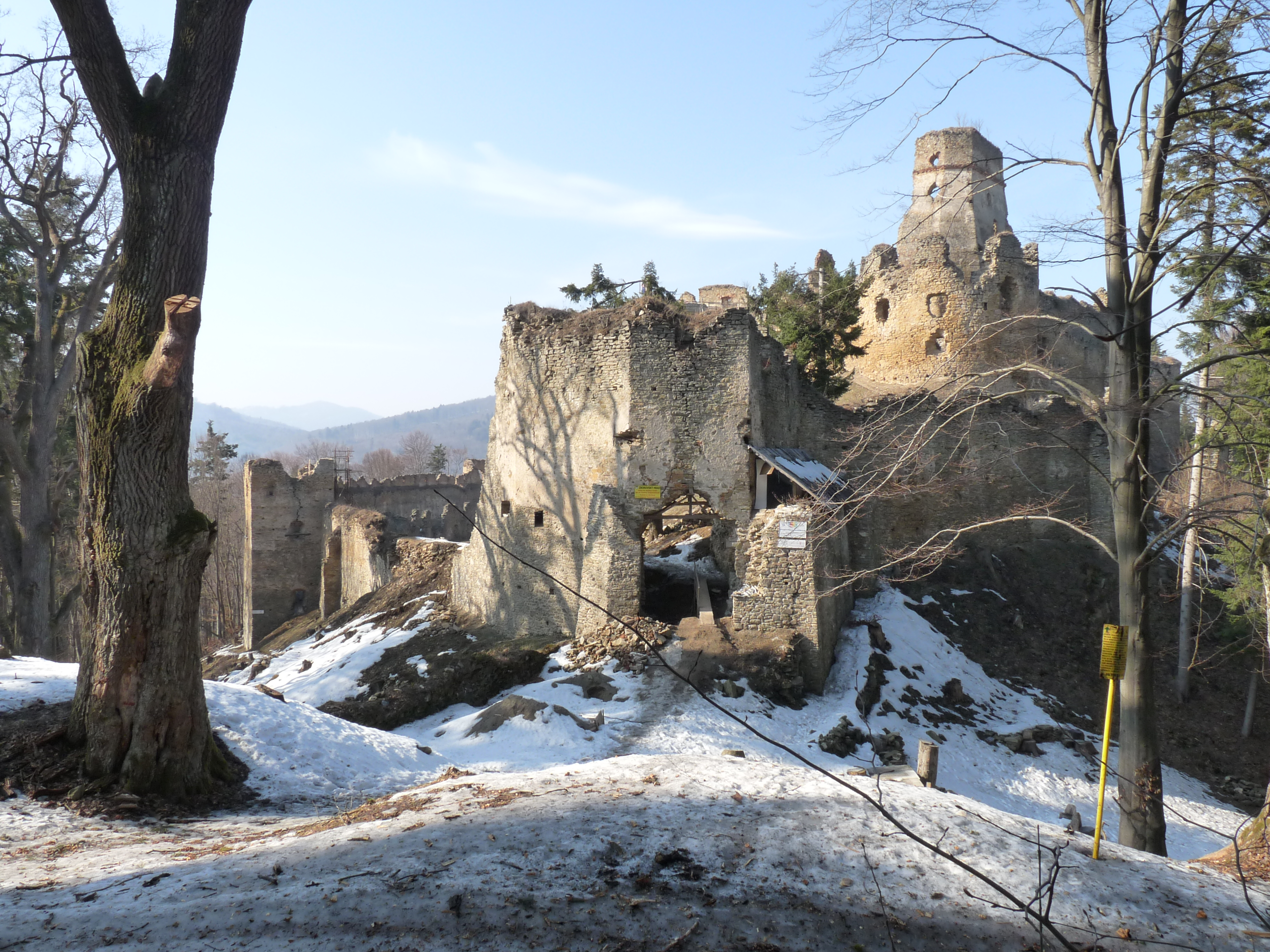
The castle of Zborov (Makovica), one of the few forts outside his province, where Philip Drugeth was granted royal honor and acted as castellan

A professional staff had emerged in the provincial administration of Philip Drugeth. Among them, Stephen Zoárd was styled as treasurer of the province in the period from 1325 to 1326. Drugeth's deputy in Szepes County was Thomas Semsei, who served as vice-ispán and vice-castellan there throughout from 1315 to 1327. Michael, son of Lampert (ancestor of the Újfalusi family) acted as castellan of Füzér between 1320 and 1330, while Lucas "the German" functioned as vice-ispán of Abaúj County from 1321 to 1329 and castellan of Gönc from 1321 to 1324. Another prominent servants were brothers Blaise and John Fonyi from the gens Csák, who held various offices in the province. Drugeth's notary was Matthias, who continued his profession under William's lordship. Several members of Drugeth's familia formerly swore allegiance to Amadeus Aba and his clan, including Nicholas Perényi, John Forrói and Stephen Zoárd. The Court of Vizsoly already had a tradition from the oligarchic province of Amadeus Aba since the 1290s. Philip Drugeth revived the institution around 1318. His most loyal familiaris Nicholas Perényi headed the court from the beginnings until 1334. He was styled as judge of the court, then vice-judge. When Drugeth was made Palatine in early 1323, he temporarily made Perényi as his "provincial" vice-palatine, while a certain John became the new judge of the Court of Vizsoly. By the summer of that year, Drugeth restored the old situation and Perényi became head of the Court of Vizsoly with the title vice-judge. Perényi was responsible for the judicial affairs in the Drugeth Province and those counties – Szabolcs, Bereg, Szatmár and Zemplén –, where Drugeth acted as interim royal judge, obtaining "empty honors".

== Possessions ==
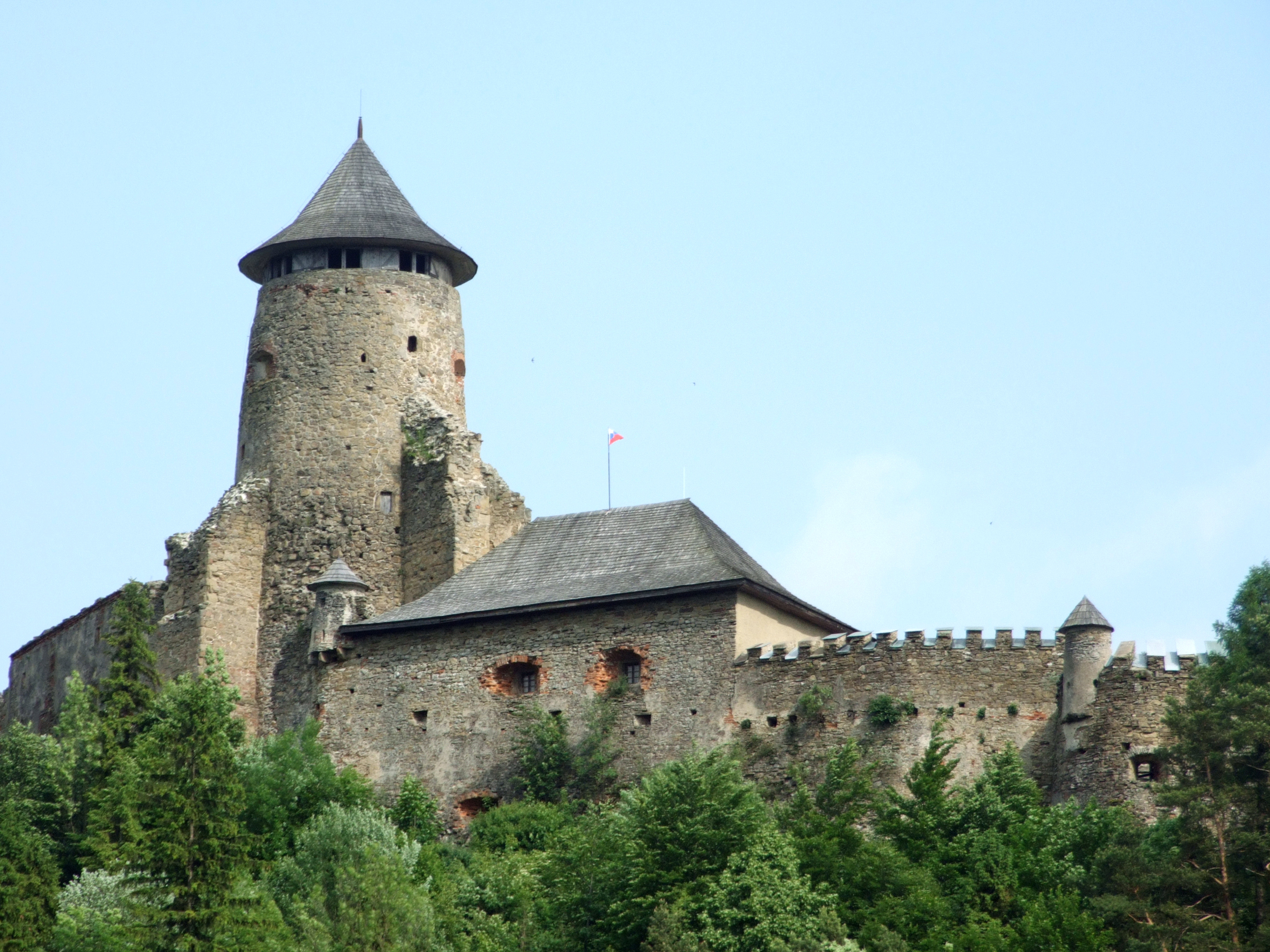
Philip Drugeth possessed Lubló Castle in Szepes County (today in Stará Ľubovňa, Slovakia)

In just over a decade, Philip Drugeth became one of the richest landowners in the Kingdom of Hungary. When he died without male heir in 1327, his possessions (personal wealth) were reverted to the Crown, but Charles I made Drugeth's nephew William as his heir and he renewed and transcribed the previous land donations to him in August 1327. William was inducted to his new properties in February 1328. This document itemizes his inherited (i.e. not honor) estates (iure perpetuo). Accordingly, when Drugeth died, he was considered the owner of the following castles and possessions with its accessories: the castles of Lubló and the nearby town Podolin in Szepes County (present-day Stará Ľubovňa and Podolínec in Slovakia, respectively), the castle of Palocsa (Plaveč) with six villages, Bertót (Bertotovce), Újfalu (Vámosújfalu, present-day Chminianska Nová Ves), Frics (Fričovce), Hedri (Hendrichovce), Siroka (Široké), Vitézfalva (Víťaz) in Sáros County, the castle of Parics with the village Terebes (Trebišov, Slovakia), along with the castles of Barkó and Jeszenő in Zemplén County. Among the castles that Drugeth possessed by the right of inheritance, only Lubló in Szepes County was within the borders of the Drugeth Province, all the others were located in Zemplén and Sáros counties, which did not belong to the province at that time (later William extended his territorial rule to these counties too).

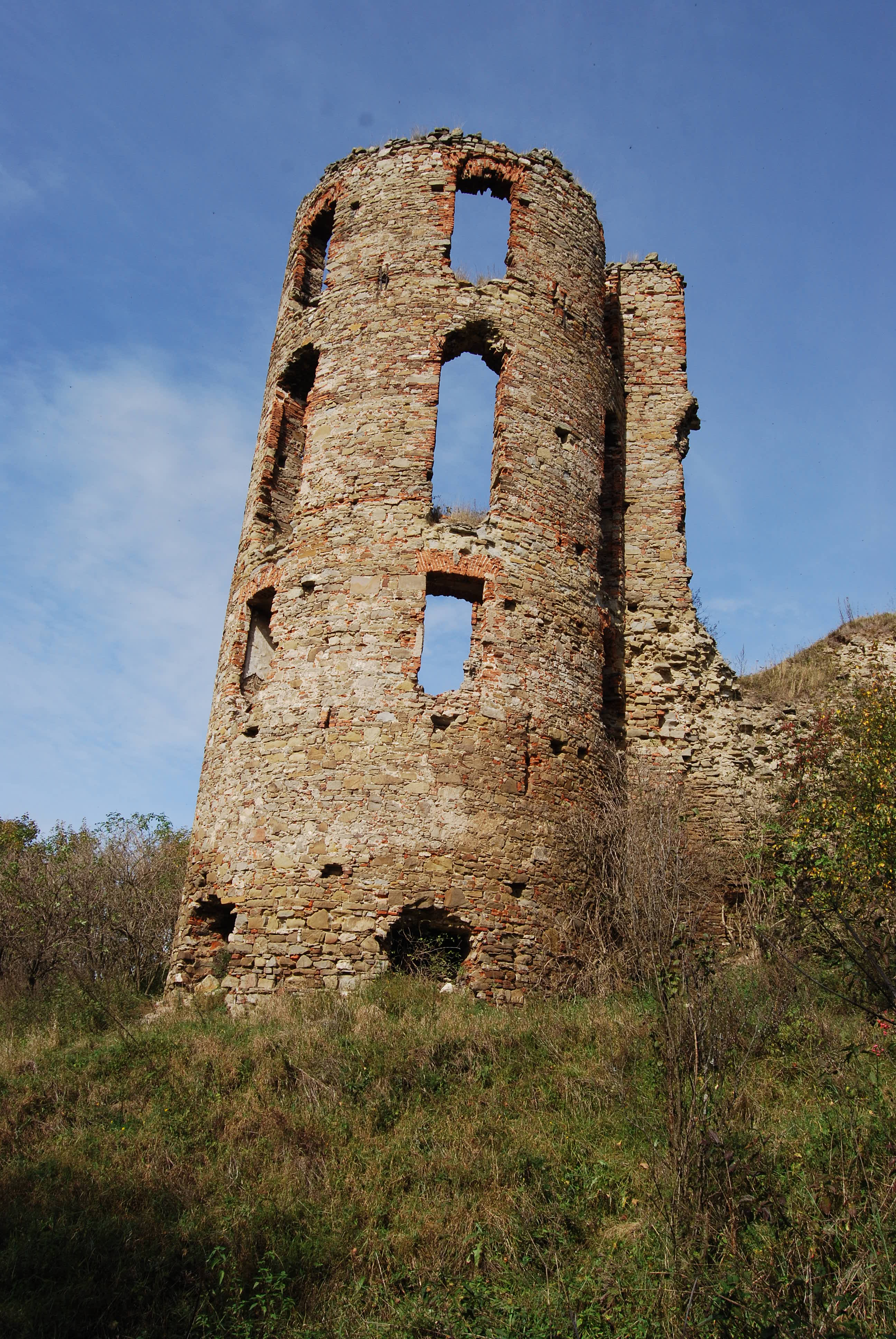
The ruins of Plaveč (Palocsa) Castle, which Philip Drugeth was granted by King Charles I in 1317

There are uncertainties as to exactly when he acquired the above-mentioned possessions. Charles I donated Palocsa Castle to him in that royal charter on 3 November 1317, which preserved some details of Drugeth's early life and career. The king confirmed the land donation in 1323, when he began to use a new royal seal. By that time, Drugeth also owned Lubló Castle with its accessory Podolin. He acquired the castles in Zemplén County – Barkó and Jeszenő – following the defeat and fall of Peter, son of Petenye in 1317. According to a 1831 register of a charter that have now been lost, Drugeth also became the owner of additional twenty-one possessions in Zemplén County, which had formerly belonged to Peter's oligarchic province: Peticse (Ptičie), Kemence (Kamenica nad Cirochou), Szinna (Snina), Tavarna (Tovarné), Sztakcsin (Stakčínska Roztoka), Zubna (Zubné), Papfalva (Papín), Jankóc (Jankovce), Hankóc (Hankovce), Lácfalva (Lackovce), Hazsina (Hažín nad Cirochou), Homonna (Humenné), Porubka (Krajná Porúbka), Göröginye (Ohradzany), Kajna (Slovenská Kajňa), Lukasóc (Lukačovce), Holcsikóc (Holčíkovce), Vadna, Tankafalva, Plempnafalva and Kepla, later all belonged to the Homonna lordship in present-day Slovakia (the last four villages are unidentified). Drugeth also granted minor possessions from the collapsing wealth of Peter, son of Petenye after 1317, including Pihnye in Zemplén County (Pichne, Slovakia) and Salamon in Ung County (Solomonovo, Ukraine). He also owned Záhony in Szabolcs County (later Ung County).

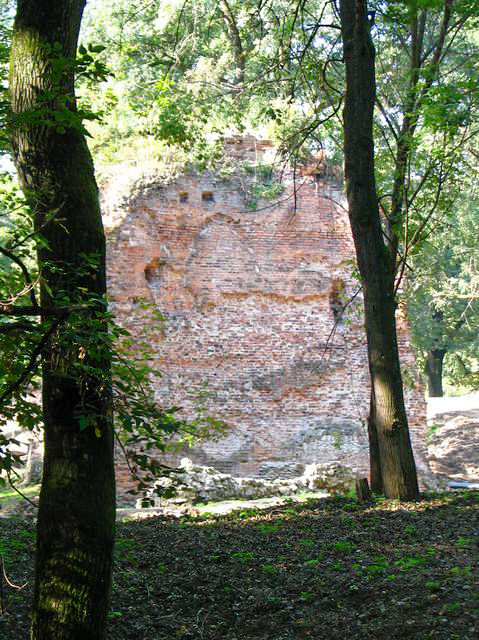
Ruins of Parič (Parics) Castle in the Trebišov park, Slovakia

According to another 19th-century register of a lost document, Drugeth was granted Parics Castle and its accessory, the village of Terebes in 1319. Prior to that, the six villages in Sáros County belonged to the ownership of the Szinyei noble family, according to a division contract of their lands in 1320. Ten years later, William Drugeth mentioned that they were acquired by his uncle through "exchange and purchase". The Szinyeis supported Charles in his struggle for the Hungarian throne, they also participated the Battle of Rozgony, therefore, their loss of grace can be ruled out. According to Attila Zsoldos, Drugeth judged over a lengthy lawsuit between the Szinyeis and Mérais, and during that time (around 1324–26) he forced the sale of the six villages, which he later legalized in the royal chancellery. Vámosújfalu was important place of collection customs in the trade route between Lőcse and Eperjes (present-day Levoča and Prešov in Slovakia, respectively), and Drugeth sought to gain control over the Branisko mountain range between his landholdings in Szepes and Sáros counties. Drugeth gained control over the trade routes which connected the region of Kassa with Poland and Galicia. The Mérais belonged to the kinship of Drugeth's wife, thus his involvement in the lawsuit collided with the principle of conflict of interest. Later, Drugeth even imprisoned Peter Szinyei, because he filed a lawsuit against John Mérai over the ownership of village Szilva (Veľký Slivník) in Sáros County. According to Rikalf Tarkői's complaint from 1324, Drugeth forced him to hand over his landholdings, which laid near Palocsa Castle along the rivers Poprad and Lubotin in Sáros County, who has fulfilled this for "fear of his [Drugeth's] wrath". Drugeth sought to settle German (Saxon) immigrants to his rarely inhabited villages in Sáros County, around the town Bártfa (Bardejov). He donated two unencumbered lands to each soltész officials in six villages in the county in 1324. He also granted liberties to his official, a certain Peter in Vámosújfalu two years later, who was responsible for conducting further settlements. His another known local official (bailiff) was Benedict Berencsi in one of the three villages called Németi in Abaúj County.

Beyond to Northeast Hungary, Drugeth owned some lands too, including Őrsziget along the river Danube in Fejér County and the neighboring Besenyő in Pest County. After learning that the estate of Őrsziget was previously part of the family heritage of Nicholas Hahót, he handed over the land to his friend and political ally, but kept the village Besenyő for himself. Due to his judicial activity as ispán then Palatine, according to which he benefited from part of the estate in question during a lawsuit (court fines and confiscations), he also owned several lands for longer or shorter periods – including, for instance Demecser, Vaja, Laskod, Hangony or Felfalu (Chvalová, Slovakia) –, which he passed into the hands of his familiares or allowed the original owners to redeem them in exchange for money.

== Palatine of Hungary ==
When Thomas Szécsényi was installed as Voivode of Transylvania, Philip Drugeth succeeded him in the position of Treasurer of the Queen's Court in 1321. Although Drugeth nominally became a member of the household of Queen Elizabeth of Poland, the third (or fourth) wife of Charles, he remained a partisan of the king, who also exercised the right of appointment over the officials of the Queen's Court. With this appointment, Drugeth elevated into the group of "major barons", who held one of the great officers of state in the Kingdom of Hungary. Following the sudden death of Dózsa Debreceni in late 1322 or early 1323, Drugeth was made Palatine of Hungary, the most powerful secular position after the monarch, sometime between 14 and 20 January 1323. Based on a document, it is possible that Philip already took the dignity in December 1322, according to historian Tibor Szőcs. Drugeth first appeared in this capacity, when summoned a palatinal assembly in Gáva in Szabolcs County on 18 January, according to Enikő Spekner. For a few weeks, Drugeth simultaneously served as Palatine of Hungary and Treasurer of the Queen's Court, in the latter position he was replaced by Mikcs Ákos in February 1323. Drugeth was also referred to as ispán of Fejér County by a single document in March 1323. According to Hardi, Drugeth became the frontrunner of the new Angevin aristocracy, which had emerged after Charles had taken "full possession" of his kingdom by 1323. His appointment as Palatine was also a huge step forward for his family; after five decades of service, one of the Drugeths raised himself from the status of court nobility to the rank of barons of the realm. Former Hungarian historiography, which mistakenly assumed the introduction of Neapolitan elements in Charles' government system, also linked this "reform effort" to the person of Philip Drugeth. However, he was still a child when he left behind his homeland forever, thus he could not have been its initiator in the absence of experience in government in the Kingdom of Naples.

Shortly after his appointment as Palatine of Hungary, Philip Drugeth joined the military expedition of Ban of Slavonia Nicholas Felsőlendvai to Croatia in late summer of 1323, who launched an offensive against Ivan Nelipić, a rebellious Croatian lord, who established a sovereign power after the fall of the oligarchic Šubić family. The campaign eventually failed after short-lived successes, although, it did rise up George II Šubić against Nelipić. Under the command of the monarch, Drugeth also participated in the military campaign against the disloyal Transylvanian Saxons in the summer of 1324.

Philip Drugeth established his palatinal court at Vizsoly in Abaúj County, which laid in the territory of his province. During his four-year term as palatine, Drugeth summoned county assemblies predominantly in the northeastern part of Hungary; for the counties of Abaúj, Szabolcs, Bereg, Ugocsa, Szatmár, Bihar in 1323, for Szabolcs and Ung in 1324, for Szatmár in 1325 and for Zemplén, Szabolcs and Szatmár in 1326. He also presided over an assembly in Békés County in an unspecified time, according to a later record. According to historian Attila Zsoldos, he performed his jurisdiction arising out of the office over the whole kingdom. In contrast, Tibor Szőcs considers his competence did not extend to Transdanubia and Western Hungary. His vice-palatine was a certain Thomas, who resided in Óbuda, and represented his lord in the western part of the kingdom. For instance, Thomas presided an assembly in Zala County in October 1325. He also judged over lawsuits in Fejér, Tolna, Baranya, Somogy and Zala counties throughout the four years, but only to a limited extent, according to Szőcs, thus the palatinal court was more active in Northeast Hungary during Drugeth's tenure. Drugeth also nominated a vice-palatine in his permanent residence in Vizsoly, where his loyal familiaris Nicholas Perényi was styled as vice-judge, which resulted the establishment of two parallel palatinal courts with permanent seats in Óbuda and Vizsoly (however, Perényi had only limited decision-making powers, contrary to Thomas). Consequently, his already existing personal rule in Northeast Hungary (where he already exercised judicial ["palatinal"] powers and was referred to as "royal judge" or "the judge appointed by the king") and the palatinal institution were combined altogether after 1323. Spekner considers the jurisdiction of his two palatinal courts in Óbuda and Vizsoly territorially covered Western and Eastern Hungary, respectively. In contrast, Attila Zsoldos argues Drugeth kept a vice-palatine in Óbuda, while the provincial court functioned in Vizsoly was independent from the palatinate and Perényi served his lord not as vice-palatine but as the (vice)-judge of the province. Drugeth introduced the system of twelve jurors as a novelty in these – palatinal and provincial – courts in 1324. Two documents in the same year referred to Drugeth as "Judge of the Cumans and Pechenegs" (Latin: iudex Cumanorum et Byssenorum). It is plausible that Philip also governed Zemplén County again, possessing "empty honor" from 1325 to 1327, following Mikcs Ákos was appointed Ban of Slavonia.

== Personal life ==
Philip Drugeth – a typical representative of the foreigner or "newcomer" (Latin: advena) nobility – built strong personal relationships with the new Angevin aristocracy in Hungary. His honorary father was Demetrius Nekcsei, who was a key figure of the development of financial reforms as long-time Master of the treasury, who also acknowledged Drugeth as his adoptive son. Drugeth maintained a friendly relationship with Thomas, Archbishop of Esztergom, the head of the Hungarian Catholic Church, too. Another influential prelate and royal chaplain Csanád Telegdi (later also Archbishop of Esztergom) functioned as his personal confessor. All of them studied in Italian universities. A Latin-language letter with personal tone, handwritten by Demetrius Nekcsei to Drugeth was preserved, which also demonstrates Drugeth's high literacy and education. Drugeth also maintained a close relationship with Nicholas Hahót. Another political ally and later family-in-law was Mikcs Ákos, the Ban of Slavonia from 1325 to 1343. Drugeth was also an early representative of the Western chivalry and courtly culture in Hungary. It is plausible that he was a founding member of the Order of Saint George, the first secular chivalric order in the world, which was established by Charles I in 1326. His two surviving seals (1322, 1324) also depicted a mounted knight. Historian Đura Hardi considers a fresco from 1317 in St Martin's Cathedral in Spišská Kapitula (Hungarian: Szepeshely) depicts the 1310 coronation of Charles, also represents Philip Drugeth, holding the royal sword during the ceremony. Majority of the historians – based on a 19th-century pseudo-inscription – previously believed it depicts one of Drugeth's vassal Thomas Semsei, the vice-ispán of Szepes County and deputy castellan of Szepes Castle from 1315 to 1327. The four F letters on his stylized shield could relate to his Latinized name (Filippus). Drugeth was also patron of the Augustinian chapel consecrated to St. Ladislaus I of Hungary in the village Perény (present-day part of Perín-Chym in Slovakia). When Visegrád became capital in 1323, Drugeth lingered there several times, where he also possessed a palace in the neighborhood of Mikcs Ákos' residence.

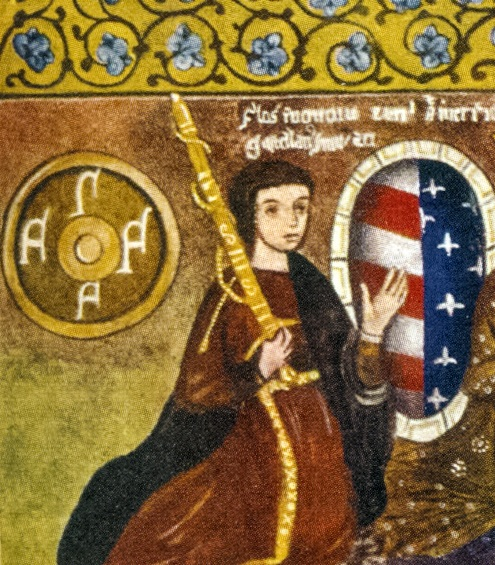
According to Serbian historian Đura Hardi, a fresco in Spišská Kapitula, present-day Slovakia, which represents the coronation of Charles I (detail), also depicts Philip Drugeth with a sword and a shield with four F letters

Around 1318, Philip Drugeth married a certain Margaret of bourgeois origin. She descended from the lineage of Menna, who served as a nursemaid and maid of honour in the court of Queen Elizabeth the Cuman in the 1260–1270s and cared for several children of the royal couple, including Ladislaus IV and Mary, the future Queen consort of Naples (paternal grandmother of Charles I). For their service, Menna and her husband Michael were granted the queenly estates Alnémeti, Felnémeti and Középnémeti in Abaúj County by Queen Elizabeth and Queen Isabella, Ladislaus IV's consort (all three villages belong to present-day Milhosť in Slovakia). They had a daughter Elizabeth, whose daughter was Clara, the mother of Margaret. She married a certain Nicholas, a burgher in Buda (possibly the son of Veydunerius). Margaret first appeared in contemporary records in late 1324, when she owned third portions in the above-mentioned villages as her dowry with the consent of her relatives. She was already the wife of Drugeth by then, who financially supported the erection of a Pauline chapel dedicated to St. Ladislaus near Középnémeti in 1319. Drugeth and Margaret had no surviving sons. Their marriage produced two daughters; Clara became the wife of Ákos, the son of Mikcs Ákos, while Margaret married to Nicholas II Felsőlendvai, who died in October 1346. Clara passed away sometime before 1354, thereafter, her sister, the widow Margaret married to her former brother-in-law Ákos Mikcsfi. Drugeth's widow Margaret was still alive in 1351. She resided in the private residence Újvár, after Charles donated her following her husband's death. She also owned Felnémeti, Középnémeti, in addition to Somogy (Smižany) in Szepes County and the custom at Őr (Strážky, today a borough of Spišská Belá).

Drugeth's health had deteriorated by the middle of 1327. He last appeared as an active person on 7 June 1327, when judged over a lawsuit in Vizsoly. His court ceased its activities for the upcoming weeks, as possible evidence of deterioration in his health. He was last mentioned as a living person on 22 June. He died by 11 July. As one of the few non-royal persons, he was buried in the Basilica of the Assumption of the Blessed Virgin Mary in Székesfehérvár, the burial place of the kings of Hungary. His signet ring with the family coat-of-arms and the circumscription "S. PH[ILIPHI] PALATINI" was excavated by archaeologists there in the 1930s. Attila Zsoldos identified the jewel as a burial ring because the size of the seal impressions preserved on Philip's charters are different from that. Since the basilica was destroyed by fire in that year, it is possible that Philip's corpse was later transferred there after a first burial in an unknown location. Drugeth died without legitimate male heirs. Shortly after (or before) his death, his brother John I and his nephews – William, Nicholas I and John II – were invited from Naples to Hungary in order to inherit his wealth and power. After sewing the threads permanently in South Italy, John I was installed as Palatine of Hungary by Charles I in 1328, after almost a year of vacancy. William, who already resided in Hungary in August 1327, became the heir and new lord of the Drugets' province in Northeast Hungary, and later also succeeding his father as Palatine, who died in 1333. Later offsprings of the Drugeth family, which became extinct in 1684 with the execution of Sigismund II by Prince Emeric Thököly (the last male member Bishop Valentine II died in 1691), descended from the youngest son John II, preserving properties in Ung County after the decline in political influence during the reign of Louis I.

== Sources ==
- Csukovits, Enikő (2009). "Az Anjou-kori intézményi újítások nápolyi párhuzamai [Neapolitan Parallels of the Institutional Reforms in Angevin Hungary]". In Neumann, Tibor; Rácz, György (eds.). Honoris causa. Tanulmányok Engel Pál tiszteletére (Analecta mediaevalia III) (in Hungarian). PPKE Történettudományi Intézete. pp. 19–62. ISBN 978-963-9627-25-3.
- Engel, Pál (1988). "Az ország újraegyesítése. I. Károly küzdelmei az oligarchák ellen (1310–1323) [Reunification of the Realm. The Struggles of Charles I Against the Oligarchs (1310–1323)]". Századok (in Hungarian). 122 (1–2). Magyar Történelmi Társulat: 89–146. ISSN 0039-8098.
- Engel, Pál (1996). Magyarország világi archontológiája, 1301–1457, I. [Secular Archontology of Hungary, 1301–1457, Volume I] (in Hungarian). História, MTA Történettudományi Intézete. ISBN 963-8312-44-0.
- Hardi, Đura (2012). Drugeti. Povest o usponu i padu porodice pratilaca Anžujskih kraljeva [Drugeths. The History of the Rise and Decline of the Escorts of Angevin Kings] (in Serbo-Croatian (Latin script)). Faculty of Philosophy, University of Novi Sad. ISBN 978-86-6065-108-4.
- Kristó, Gyula, ed. (2000). Középkori históriák oklevelekben (1002–1410) [Medieval Stories in Charters (1002–1410)] (in Hungarian). Szegedi Középkorász Műhely. ISBN 963-482-423-4.
- Kristó, Gyula (2003). "I. Károly király harcai a tartományurak ellen (1310–1323) [The Struggles of Charles I Against the Oligarchs (1310–1323)]". Századok (in Hungarian). 137 (2). Magyar Történelmi Társulat: 297–347. ISSN 0039-8098.
- Markó, László (2006). A magyar állam főméltóságai Szent Istvántól napjainkig: Életrajzi Lexikon [Great Officers of State in Hungary from King Saint Stephen to Our Days: A Biographical Encyclopedia] (in Hungarian). Helikon Kiadó. ISBN 963-208-970-7.
- Spekner, Enikő (2015). Hogyan lett Buda a középkori Magyarország fővárosa? A budai királyi székhely története a 12. század végétől a 14. század közepéig [How did Buda become the capital of medieval Hungary? The history of the royal seat of Buda from the end of the twelfth century to the middle of the fourteenth] (in Hungarian). Budapesti Történeti Múzeum. ISBN 978-615-5341-19-9.
- Szőcs, Tibor (2014). A nádori intézmény korai története, 1000–1342 [An Early History of the Palatinal Institution: 1000–1342] (in Hungarian). Magyar Tudományos Akadémia Támogatott Kutatások Irodája. ISBN 978-963-508-697-9.
- Zsoldos, Attila (2017). A Druget-tartomány története 1315–1342 [The History of the Druget Province 1315–1342] (in Hungarian). MTA Bölcsészettudományi Kutatóközpont Történettudományi Intézete. ISBN 978-963-4160-63-2.
- Zsoldos, Attila (2024). "Druget Fülöp Fehérváron [Philip Druget in Székesfehérvár]". Ars Hungarica (in Hungarian). 50 (4): 357–368. ISSN 0133-1531.

Philip House of Drugeth Born: c. 1288 Died: June/July 1327
Political offices
New office	Lord of the Drugeth Province; 1315–1327	Succeeded by William Drugeth
Preceded by Thomas Szécsényi	Treasurer of the Queen's Court; 1321–1323	Succeeded by Mikcs Ákos
Preceded by Dózsa Debreceni	Palatine of Hungary; 1323–1327	Succeeded by John Drugeth
