= Novosad =

Village and municipality in Slovakia

- Municipality
- Flag

- Location of Novosad in the Košice Region Location of Novosad in Slovakia
- Coordinates: 48.53°N 21.73°E
- Country: Slovakia
- Region: Košice Region
- District: Trebišov District
- First mentioned: 1318

Area
  - Total: 15.25 km^{2} (5.89 sq mi)
- Elevation: 114 m (374 ft)

Population (2025)
  - Total: 1,038
- Time zone: UTC+1 (CET)
  - Summer (DST): UTC+2 (CEST)
- Postal code: 760 2
- Area code: +421 56
- Vehicle registration plate (until 2022): TV
- Website: www.obecnovosad.sk

Novosad (Hungarian: Bodzásújlak) is a village and municipality in the Trebišov District in the Košice Region of south-eastern Slovakia.

== History ==
In historical records the village was first mentioned in 1318.

== Geography ==
The municipality lies at an altitude of 114 metres (374 ft) and covers an area of 15.25 km^{2} (5.89 sq mi) (2025).

== Population ==
Population statistic (10 years)
Year	1995	2005	2015	2025
Count	928	1034	1023	1038
Difference		+11.42%	−1.06%	+1.46%

Population statistic
Year	2024	2025
Count	1040	1038
Difference		−0.19%

It has a population of 1038 people (31 December 2025).

=== Ethnicity ===
Census 2021 (1+ %)
Ethnicity	Number	Fraction
Slovak	980	96.36%
Romani	119	11.7%
Not found out	28	2.75%
Total	1017	

In year 2021 was 1017 people by ethnicity 980 as Slovak, 119 as Romani, 28 as Not found out, 10 as Rusyn, 6 as Hungarian, 5 as Czech, 2 as Other and 1 as Russian.

Note on population: The difference values of population numbers in the table "Population statistic" and in the sections "Ethnicity" & "Religion" is caused by the use of various statistical methods.

=== Religion ===
Census 2021 (1+ %)
Religion	Number	Fraction
Greek Catholic Church	441	43.36%
Roman Catholic Church	391	38.45%
Not found out	52	5.11%
None	51	5.01%
Calvinist Church	49	4.82%
Evangelical Church	14	1.38%
Total	1017	

In year 2021 was 1017 people by religion 441 from Greek Catholic Church, 391 from Roman Catholic Church, 52 from Not found out, 51 from None, 49 from Calvinist Church, 14 from Evangelical Church, 9 from Eastern Orthodox Church, 5 from Jehovah's Witnesses, 3 from Ad hoc movements, 1 from Islam and 1 from Buddhism.

== Facilities ==
The village has a public library and a soccer pitch.
