= Krajná Porúbka =

- Municipality
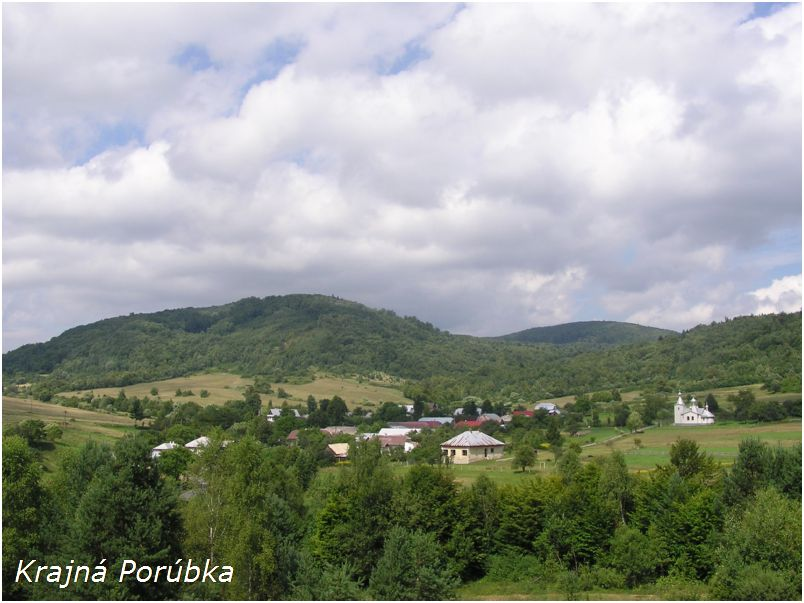

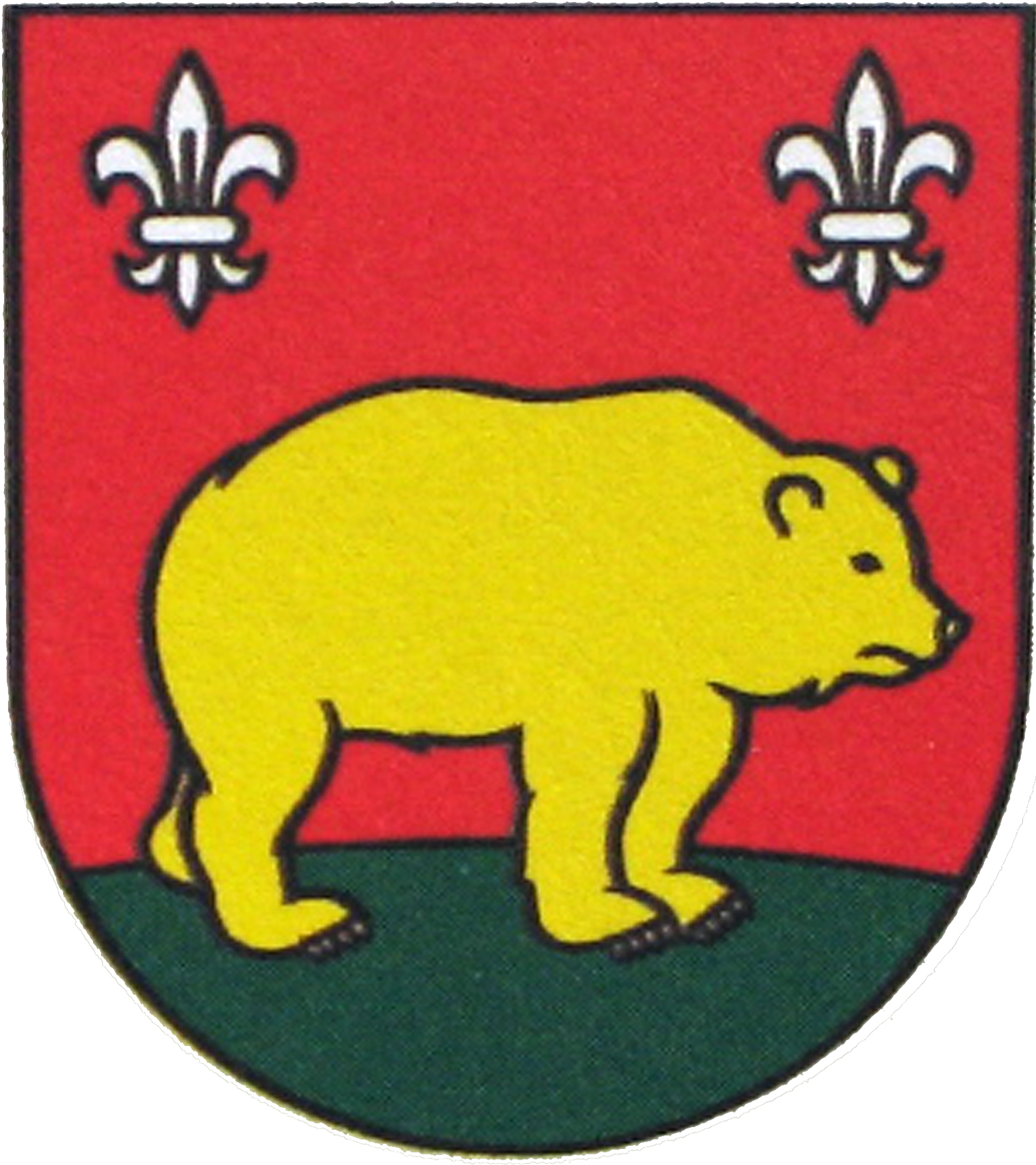
- Flag Coat of arms

- Location of Krajná Porúbka in the Prešov Region Location of Krajná Porúbka in Slovakia
- Coordinates: 49.40°N 21.65°E
- Country: Slovakia
- Region: Prešov Region
- District: Svidník District
- First mentioned: 1582

Area
  - Total: 3.72 km^{2} (1.44 sq mi)
- Elevation: 414 m (1,358 ft)

Population (2025)
  - Total: 33
- Time zone: UTC+1 (CET)
  - Summer (DST): UTC+2 (CEST)
- Postal code: 900 4
- Area code: +421 54
- Vehicle registration plate (until 2022): SK
- Website: www.krajnaporubka.dcom.sk

Krajná Porúbka (Rusyn: Крайня Порубка; Hungarian: Végortovány, until 1899: Krajnó-Porubka) is a village and municipality in Svidník District in the Prešov Region of north-eastern Slovakia.

== History ==
In historical records the village was first mentioned in 1582.

== Geography ==
The municipality lies at an altitude of 414 metres (1,358 ft) and covers an area of 3.72 km^{2} (1.44 sq mi) (2025).

== Population ==
Population statistic (10 years)
Year	1995	2005	2015	2025
Count	60	53	49	33
Difference		−11.66%	−7.54%	−32.65%

Population statistic
Year	2024	2025
Count	34	33
Difference		−2.94%

It has a population of 33 people (31 December 2025).

=== Ethnicity ===
Census 2021 (1+ %)
Ethnicity	Number	Fraction
Rusyn	29	82.85%
Slovak	23	65.71%
Total	35	

In year 2021 was 35 people by ethnicity 29 as Rusyn and 23 as Slovak.

Note on population: The difference values of population numbers in the table "Population statistic" and in the sections "Ethnicity" & "Religion" is caused by the use of various statistical methods.

=== Religion ===
Census 2021 (1+ %)
Religion	Number	Fraction
Eastern Orthodox Church	29	82.86%
Greek Catholic Church	3	8.57%
None	2	5.71%
Roman Catholic Church	1	2.86%
Total	35	

In year 2021 was 35 people by religion 29 from Eastern Orthodox Church, 3 from Greek Catholic Church, 2 from None and 1 from Roman Catholic Church.

== Genealogical resources ==
The records for genealogical research are available at the state archive "Statny Archiv in Presov, Slovakia"

- Greek Catholic church records (births/marriages/deaths): 1787-1950 (parish B)

== See also ==
- List of municipalities and towns in Slovakia
