= Holčíkovce =

- Municipality
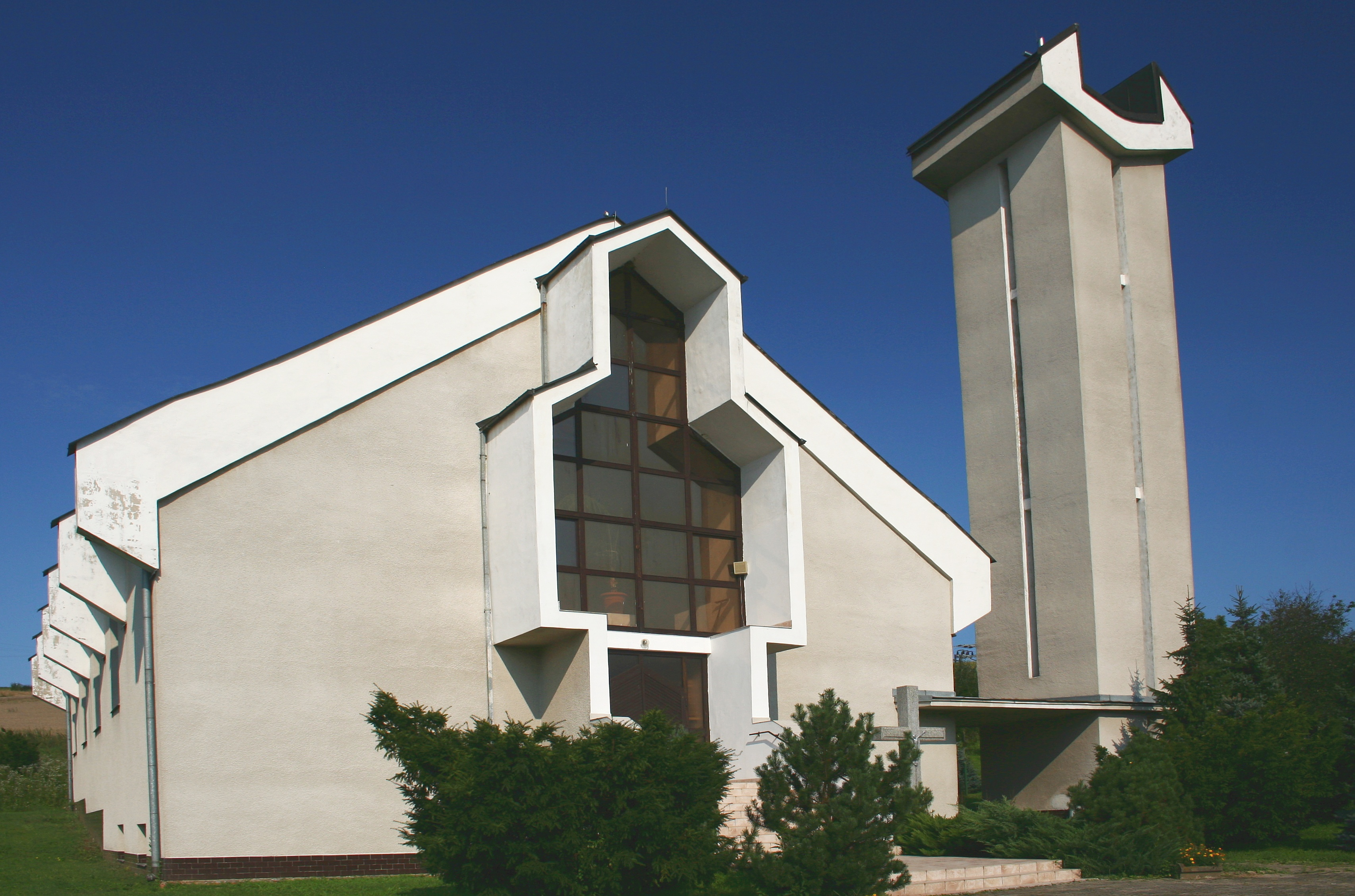

- Flag

- Location of Holčíkovce in the Prešov Region Location of Holčíkovce in Slovakia
- Coordinates: 49.02°N 21.73°E
- Country: Slovakia
- Region: Prešov Region
- District: Vranov nad Topľou District
- First mentioned: 1408

Area
  - Total: 12.54 km^{2} (4.84 sq mi)
- Elevation: 153 m (502 ft)

Population (2025)
  - Total: 417
- Time zone: UTC+1 (CET)
  - Summer (DST): UTC+2 (CEST)
- Postal code: 940 5
- Area code: +421 57
- Vehicle registration plate (until 2022): VT
- Website: www.holcikovce.sk

Holčíkovce (Hungarian: Holcsík, until 1899: Holcsikócz) is a village and municipality in Vranov nad Topľou District in the Prešov Region of eastern Slovakia.

In historical records the village was first mentioned in 1408.

The municipality lies at an altitude of 165 metres and covers an area of 12.546 km². It has a population of about 464 people.

== Geography ==
The municipality lies at an altitude of 153 metres (502 ft) and covers an area of 12.54 km^{2} (4.84 sq mi) (2025).

== Population ==
Population statistic (10 years)
Year	1995	2005	2015	2025
Count	466	474	431	417
Difference		+1.71%	−9.07%	−3.24%

Population statistic
Year	2024	2025
Count	419	417
Difference		−0.47%

It has a population of 417 people (31 December 2025).

=== Ethnicity ===
Census 2021 (1+ %)
Ethnicity	Number	Fraction
Slovak	412	98.32%
Rusyn	16	3.81%
Not found out	7	1.67%
Total	419	

In year 2021 was 419 people by ethnicity 412 as Slovak, 16 as Rusyn, 7 as Not found out, 2 as Czech, 2 as Polish and 1 as Russian.

Note on population: The difference values of population numbers in the table "Population statistic" and in the sections "Ethnicity" & "Religion" is caused by the use of various statistical methods.

=== Religion ===
Census 2021 (1+ %)
Religion	Number	Fraction
Roman Catholic Church	344	82.1%
Greek Catholic Church	53	12.65%
None	11	2.63%
Total	419	

In year 2021 was 419 people by religion 344 from Roman Catholic Church, 53 from Greek Catholic Church, 11 from None, 4 from Eastern Orthodox Church, 4 from Not found out, 1 from Other, 1 from Evangelical Church and 1 from Ad hoc movements.

== See also ==
- List of municipalities and towns in Slovakia
