= Tovarné =

- Municipality
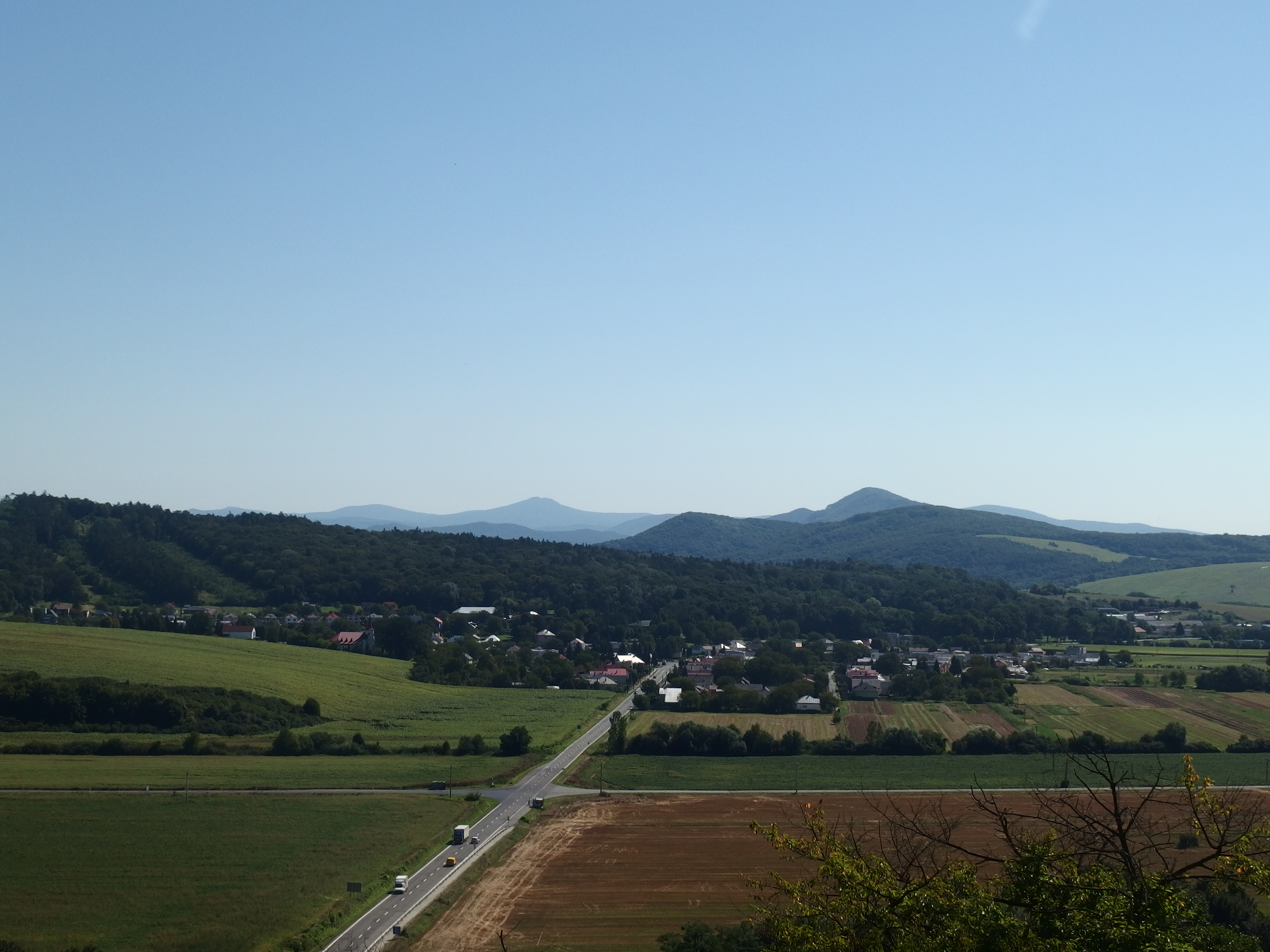

- Flag

- Location of Tovarné in the Prešov Region Location of Tovarné in Slovakia
- Coordinates: 48.92°N 21.77°E
- Country: Slovakia
- Region: Prešov Region
- District: Vranov nad Topľou District
- First mentioned: 1479

Area
  - Total: 7.70 km^{2} (2.97 sq mi)
- Elevation: 127 m (417 ft)

Population (2025)
  - Total: 964
- Time zone: UTC+1 (CET)
  - Summer (DST): UTC+2 (CEST)
- Postal code: 940 1
- Area code: +421 57
- Vehicle registration plate (until 2022): VT
- Website: tovarne.sk

Tovarné (Hungarian: Tavarna) is a village and municipality in Vranov nad Topľou District in the Prešov Region of eastern Slovakia.

== History ==
In historical records the village was first mentioned in 1479.

== Geography ==
The municipality lies at an altitude of 127 metres (417 ft) and covers an area of 7.70 km^{2} (2.97 sq mi) (2025).

== Population ==
Population statistic (10 years)
Year	1995	2005	2015	2025
Count	1049	1080	988	964
Difference		+2.95%	−8.51%	−2.42%

Population statistic
Year	2024	2025
Count	977	964
Difference		−1.33%

It has a population of 964 people (31 December 2025).

=== Ethnicity ===
Census 2021 (1+ %)
Ethnicity	Number	Fraction
Slovak	975	98.28%
Rusyn	24	2.41%
Not found out	16	1.61%
Total	992	

In year 2021 was 992 people by ethnicity 975 as Slovak, 24 as Rusyn, 16 as Not found out, 6 as Romani, 4 as Russian, 2 as Czech, 2 as Hungarian, 1 as Ukrainian, 1 as Other and 1 as English.

Note on population: The difference values of population numbers in the table "Population statistic" and in the sections "Ethnicity" & "Religion" is caused by the use of various statistical methods.

=== Religion ===
Census 2021 (1+ %)
Religion	Number	Fraction
Roman Catholic Church	717	72.28%
Greek Catholic Church	161	16.23%
None	48	4.84%
Evangelical Church	25	2.52%
Not found out	18	1.81%
Eastern Orthodox Church	15	1.51%
Total	992	

In year 2021 was 992 people by religion 717 from Roman Catholic Church, 161 from Greek Catholic Church, 48 from None, 25 from Evangelical Church, 18 from Not found out, 15 from Eastern Orthodox Church, 2 from Paganism and natural spirituality, 2 from Christian Congregations in Slovakia, 2 from Ad hoc movements, 1 from Jehovah's Witnesses and 1 from United Methodist Church.
