= Papín =

- Municipality
- Flag

- Location of Papín in the Prešov Region Location of Papín in Slovakia
- Coordinates: 49.10°N 22.07°E
- Country: Slovakia
- Region: Prešov Region
- District: Humenné District
- First mentioned: 1451

Area
  - Total: 25.87 km^{2} (9.99 sq mi)
- Elevation: 260 m (850 ft)

Population (2025)
  - Total: 869
- Time zone: UTC+1 (CET)
  - Summer (DST): UTC+2 (CEST)
- Postal code: 673 3
- Area code: +421 57
- Vehicle registration plate (until 2022): HE
- Website: www.obecpapin.sk

Papín is a village and municipality in Humenné District in the Prešov Region of north-east Slovakia.

== Geography ==
The municipality lies at an altitude of 260 metres (850 ft) and covers an area of 25.87 km^{2} (9.99 sq mi) (2025).

== Population ==
Population statistic (10 years)
Year	1995	2005	2015	2025
Count	1115	1066	969	869
Difference		−4.39%	−9.09%	−10.31%

Population statistic
Year	2024	2025
Count	869	869
Difference		+0%

It has a population of 869 people (31 December 2025).

=== Ethnicity ===
Census 2021 (1+ %)
Ethnicity	Number	Fraction
Slovak	877	96.58%
Rusyn	39	4.29%
Not found out	16	1.76%
Total	908	

In year 2021 was 908 people by ethnicity 877 as Slovak, 39 as Rusyn, 16 as Not found out, 5 as Ukrainian, 4 as Czech, 1 as Polish and 1 as German.

Note on population: The difference values of population numbers in the table "Population statistic" and in the sections "Ethnicity" & "Religion" is caused by the use of various statistical methods.

=== Religion ===
Census 2021 (1+ %)
Religion	Number	Fraction
Roman Catholic Church	751	82.71%
Greek Catholic Church	77	8.48%
None	44	4.85%
Not found out	14	1.54%
Eastern Orthodox Church	11	1.21%
Total	908	

In year 2021 was 908 people by religion 751 from Roman Catholic Church, 77 from Greek Catholic Church, 44 from None, 14 from Not found out, 11 from Eastern Orthodox Church, 5 from Ad hoc movements, 2 from Christian Congregations in Slovakia, 2 from Other, 1 from Calvinist Church and 1 from Other and not ascertained christian church.
