= Lackovce =

- Municipality
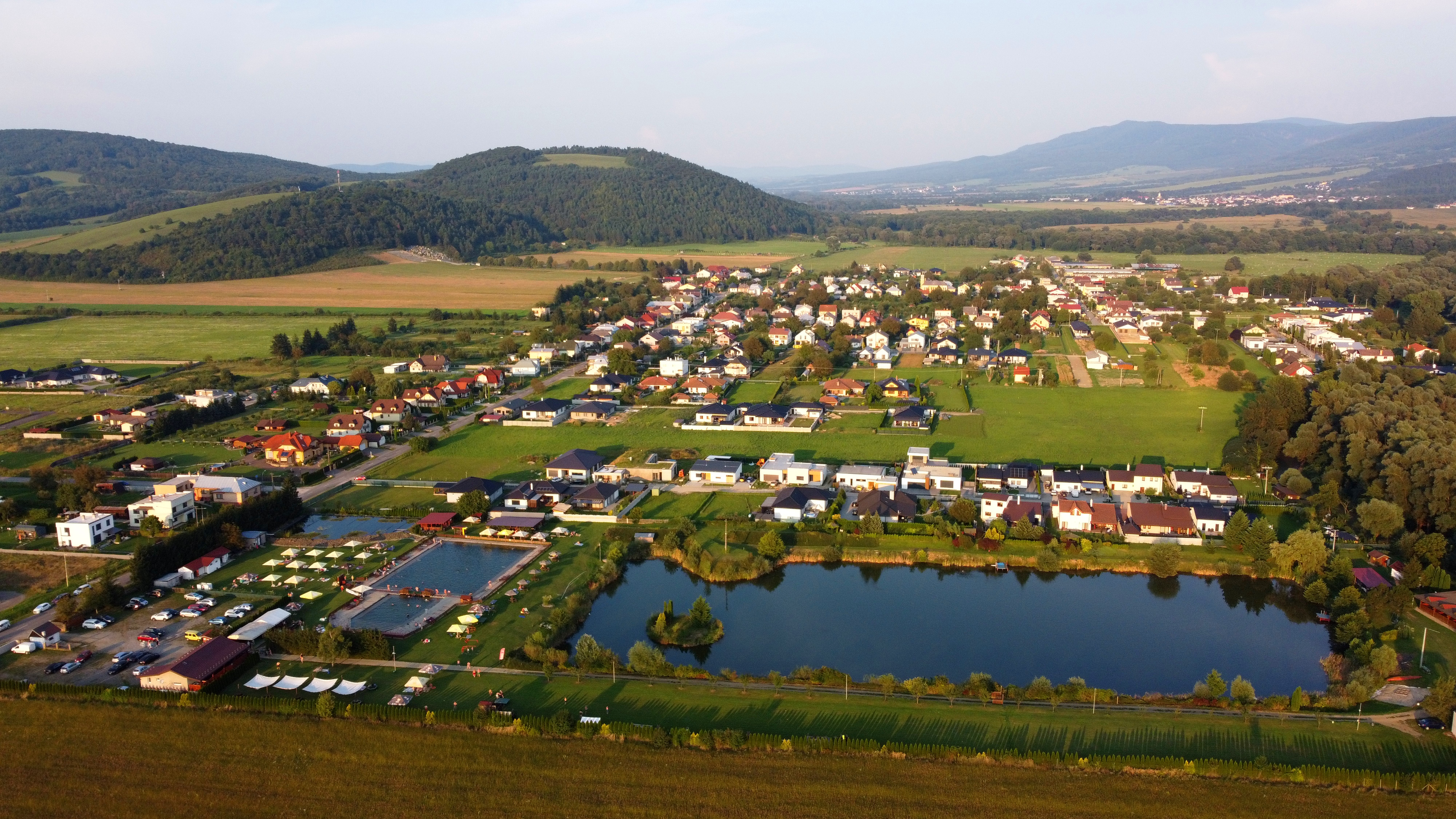

- Flag

- Location of Lackovce in the Prešov Region Location of Lackovce in Slovakia
- Coordinates: 48.94°N 21.96°E
- Country: Slovakia
- Region: Prešov Region
- District: Humenné District
- First mentioned: 1451

Area
  - Total: 0.00 km^{2} (0 sq mi)
- Elevation: 157 m (515 ft)

Population (2025)
  - Total: 953
- Time zone: UTC+1 (CET)
  - Summer (DST): UTC+2 (CEST)
- Postal code: 660 1
- Area code: +421 57
- Vehicle registration plate (until 2022): HE
- Website: www.lackovce.sk

Lackovce (Hungarian: Lácfalva) is a village and municipality in Slovakia.

== Geography ==
The municipality lies at an altitude of 157 metres (515 ft) and covers an area of 0.00 km^{2} (0 sq mi) (2025). Lackovce is situated at the confluence of the Laborec and a side stream.

== History ==
The first mention of the village was in 1451. Until the Treaty of Trianon the community belonged to the Kingdom of Hungary, to Zemplén, a district of Humenné, later to Czechoslovakia, during World War II and from 1993 to Slovakia.

== Population ==
Population statistic (10 years)
Year	1995	2005	2015	2025
Count	0	580	707	953
Difference		–	+21.89%	+34.79%

Population statistic
Year	2024	2025
Count	927	953
Difference		+2.80%

It has a population of 953 people (31 December 2025).

=== Ethnicity ===
Census 2021 (1+ %)
Ethnicity	Number	Fraction
Slovak	798	95.68%
Rusyn	70	8.39%
Not found out	13	1.55%
Total	834	

In year 2021 was 834 people by ethnicity 798 as Slovak, 70 as Rusyn, 13 as Not found out, 8 as Ukrainian, 5 as Albanian, 4 as Czech, 4 as German, 3 as Russian, 2 as Polish, 1 as Chinese, 1 as Italian, 1 as Hungarian, 1 as Other and 1 as English.

Note on population: The difference values of population numbers in the table "Population statistic" and in the sections "Ethnicity" & "Religion" is caused by the use of various statistical methods.

=== Religion ===
Census 2021 (1+ %)
Religion	Number	Fraction
Roman Catholic Church	528	63.31%
Greek Catholic Church	153	18.35%
None	86	10.31%
Eastern Orthodox Church	29	3.48%
Jehovah's Witnesses	16	1.92%
Not found out	9	1.08%
Total	834	

In year 2021 was 834 people by religion 528 from Roman Catholic Church, 153 from Greek Catholic Church, 86 from None, 29 from Eastern Orthodox Church, 16 from Jehovah's Witnesses, 9 from Not found out, 8 from Evangelical Church, 2 from Ad hoc movements, 1 from Jewish community, 1 from Other and not ascertained christian church and 1 from Christian Congregations in Slovakia.
