= Zubné =

- Municipality
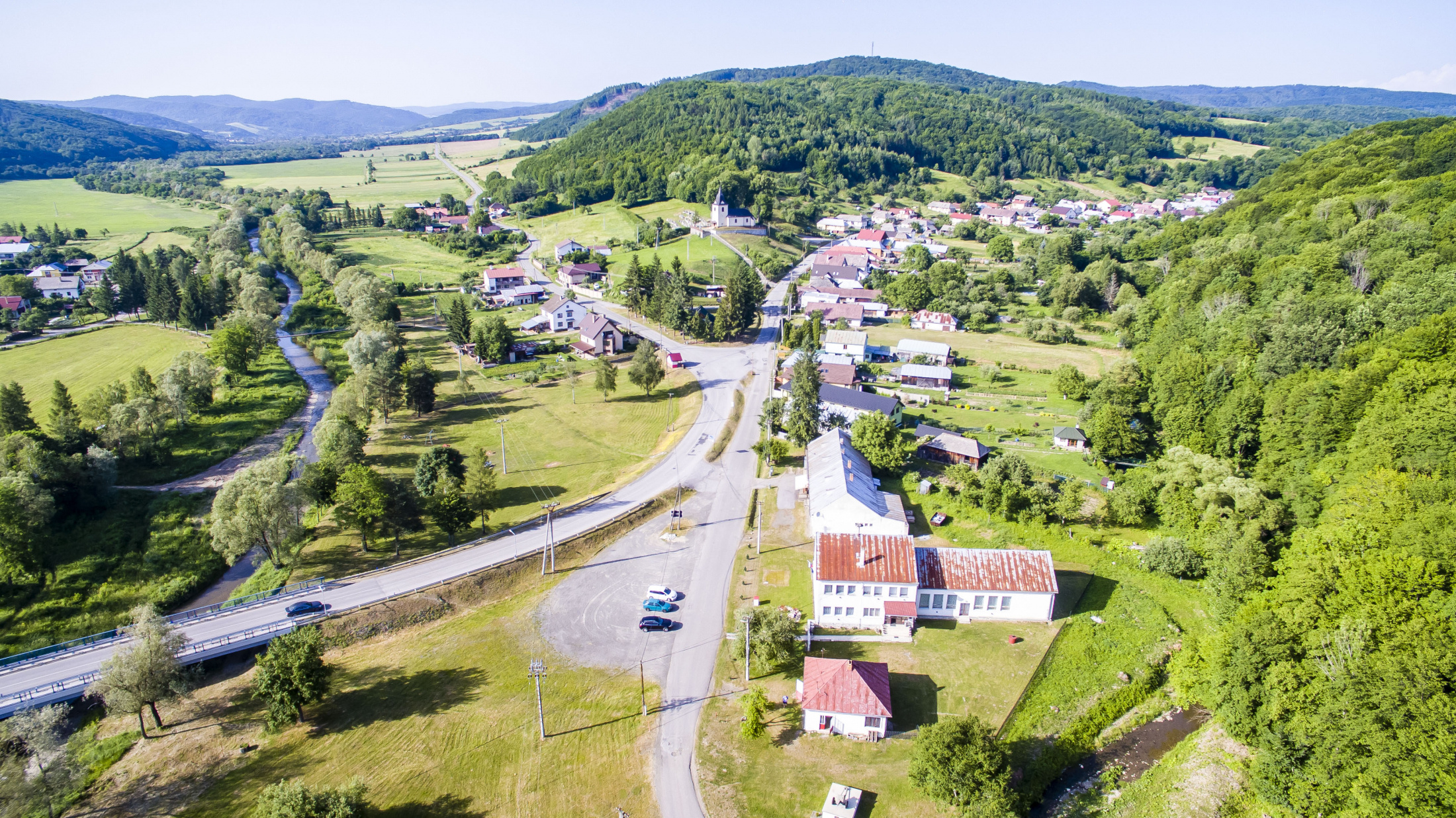

- Flag

- Location of Zubné in the Prešov Region Location of Zubné in Slovakia
- Coordinates: 49.05°N 22.07°E
- Country: Slovakia
- Region: Prešov Region
- District: Humenné District
- First mentioned: 1557

Area
  - Total: 19.55 km^{2} (7.55 sq mi)
- Elevation: 233 m (764 ft)

Population (2025)
  - Total: 342
- Time zone: UTC+1 (CET)
  - Summer (DST): UTC+2 (CEST)
- Postal code: 673 3
- Area code: +421 57
- Vehicle registration plate (until 2022): HE
- Website: www.obeczubne.sk

Zubné is a village and municipality in Humenné District in the Prešov Region of north-east Slovakia.

== History ==
In historical records the village was first mentioned in 1557.

== Geography ==
The municipality lies at an altitude of 233 metres (764 ft) and covers an area of 19.55 km^{2} (7.55 sq mi) (2025).

== Population ==
Population statistic (10 years)
| Year | 1995 | 2005 | 2015 | 2025 |
|---|---|---|---|---|
| Count | 398 | 374 | 363 | 342 |
| Difference | | −6.03% | −2.94% | −5.78% |

Population statistic
| Year | 2024 | 2025 |
|---|---|---|
| Count | 349 | 342 |
| Difference | | −2.00% |

It has a population of 342 people (31 December 2025).

=== Ethnicity ===
Census 2021 (1+ %)
| Ethnicity | Number | Fraction |
|---|---|---|
| Slovak | 310 | 87.57% |
| Rusyn | 166 | 46.89% |
| Not found out | 5 | 1.41% |
| Total | 354 | |

In year 2021 was 354 people by ethnicity 310 as Slovak, 166 as Rusyn, 5 as Not found out, 2 as Irish, 1 as Czech, 1 as Romani, 1 as Romanian, 1 as Moravian and 1 as Hungarian.

Note on population: The difference values of population numbers in the table "Population statistic" and in the sections "Ethnicity" & "Religion" is caused by the use of various statistical methods.

=== Religion ===
Census 2021 (1+ %)
| Religion | Number | Fraction |
|---|---|---|
| Greek Catholic Church | 280 | 79.1% |
| Roman Catholic Church | 57 | 16.1% |
| Eastern Orthodox Church | 7 | 1.98% |
| None | 7 | 1.98% |
| Total | 354 | |

In year 2021 was 354 people by religion 280 from Greek Catholic Church, 57 from Roman Catholic Church, 7 from Eastern Orthodox Church, 7 from None, 1 from Other and not ascertained christian church, 1 from Jehovah's Witnesses and 1 from Not found out.
