= Jankovce =

- Municipality
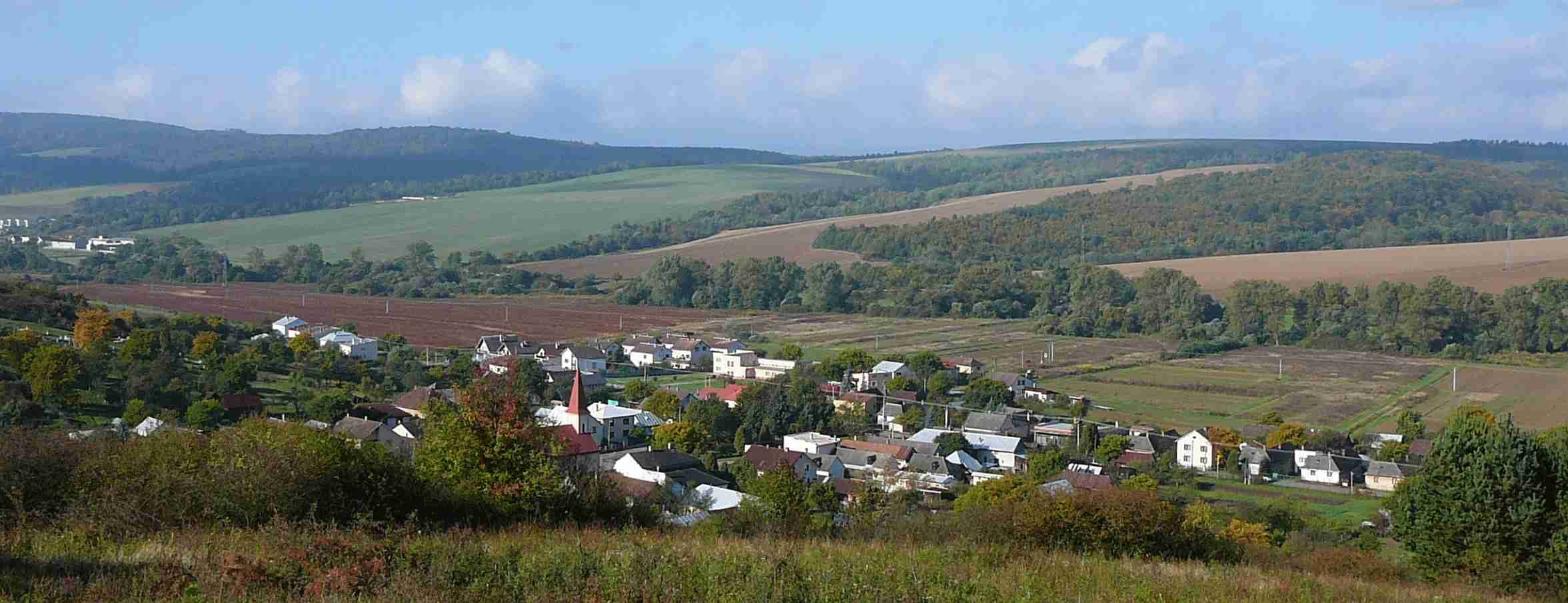

- Flag

- Location of Jankovce in the Prešov Region Location of Jankovce in Slovakia
- Coordinates: 49.07°N 21.80°E
- Country: Slovakia
- Region: Prešov Region
- District: Humenné District
- First mentioned: 1317

Area
  - Total: 5.69 km^{2} (2.20 sq mi)
- Elevation: 178 m (584 ft)

Population (2025)
  - Total: 269
- Time zone: UTC+1 (CET)
  - Summer (DST): UTC+2 (CEST)
- Postal code: 672 4
- Area code: +421 57
- Vehicle registration plate (until 2022): HE
- Website: www.jankovce.sk

Jankovce is a village and municipality in Humenné District in the Prešov Region of north-east Slovakia.

== History ==
In historical records the village was first mentioned in 1317.

== Geography ==
The municipality lies at an altitude of 178 metres (584 ft) and covers an area of 5.69 km^{2} (2.20 sq mi) (2025).

== Population ==
Population statistic (10 years)
Year	1995	2005	2015	2025
Count	279	268	271	269
Difference		−3.94%	+1.11%	−0.73%

Population statistic
Year	2024	2025
Count	269	269
Difference		+0%

It has a population of 269 people (31 December 2025).

=== Ethnicity ===
Census 2021 (1+ %)
Ethnicity	Number	Fraction
Slovak	259	97%
Rusyn	8	2.99%
Not found out	3	1.12%
Total	267	

In year 2021 was 267 people by ethnicity 259 as Slovak, 8 as Rusyn, 3 as Not found out and 1 as Hungarian.

Note on population: The difference values of population numbers in the table "Population statistic" and in the sections "Ethnicity" & "Religion" is caused by the use of various statistical methods.

=== Religion ===
Census 2021 (1+ %)
Religion	Number	Fraction
Roman Catholic Church	243	91.01%
None	12	4.49%
Greek Catholic Church	10	3.75%
Total	267	

In year 2021 was 267 people by religion 243 from Roman Catholic Church, 12 from None, 10 from Greek Catholic Church, 1 from Not found out and 1 from Evangelical Church.
