= Ptičie =

- Municipality
- Flag

- Location of Ptičie in the Prešov Region Location of Ptičie in Slovakia
- Coordinates: 48.90°N 21.96°E
- Country: Slovakia
- Region: Prešov Region
- District: Humenné District
- First mentioned: 1451

Government
  - Mayor Starosta: Martin Dzemján (SMER-SD)

Area
  - Total: 10.46 km^{2} (4.04 sq mi)
- Elevation: 212 m (696 ft)

Population (2025)
  - Total: 645
- Time zone: UTC+1 (CET)
  - Summer (DST): UTC+2 (CEST)
- Postal code: 674 1
- Area code: +421 57
- Vehicle registration plate (until 2022): HE
- Website: www.pticie.sk

Ptičie is a village and municipality in Humenné District in the Prešov Region of north-east Slovakia.

== History ==
In historical records the village was first mentioned in 1451.

== Geography ==
The municipality lies at an altitude of 212 metres (696 ft) and covers an area of 10.46 km^{2} (4.04 sq mi) (2025).

== Population ==
Population statistic (10 years)
Year	1995	2005	2015	2025
Count	646	636	651	645
Difference		−1.54%	+2.35%	−0.92%

Population statistic
Year	2024	2025
Count	640	645
Difference		+0.78%

It has a population of 645 people (31 December 2025).

=== Ethnicity ===
Census 2021 (1+ %)
Ethnicity	Number	Fraction
Slovak	605	94.82%
Not found out	26	4.07%
Rusyn	17	2.66%
Total	638	

In year 2021 was 638 people by ethnicity 605 as Slovak, 26 as Not found out, 17 as Rusyn, 3 as Other, 2 as Romani, 1 as Czech, 1 as Ukrainian and 1 as Polish.

Note on population: The difference values of population numbers in the table "Population statistic" and in the sections "Ethnicity" & "Religion" is caused by the use of various statistical methods.

=== Religion ===
Census 2021 (1+ %)
Religion	Number	Fraction
Roman Catholic Church	497	77.9%
Greek Catholic Church	59	9.25%
None	35	5.49%
Not found out	32	5.02%
Eastern Orthodox Church	9	1.41%
Total	638	

In year 2021 was 638 people by religion 497 from Roman Catholic Church, 59 from Greek Catholic Church, 35 from None, 32 from Not found out, 9 from Eastern Orthodox Church, 3 from Evangelical Church, 1 from Jehovah's Witnesses, 1 from Christian Congregations in Slovakia and 1 from Apostolic Church.

== Notable people ==
Paul Newman's mother was born in this village.
