= William Drugeth =

Hungarian Palatine

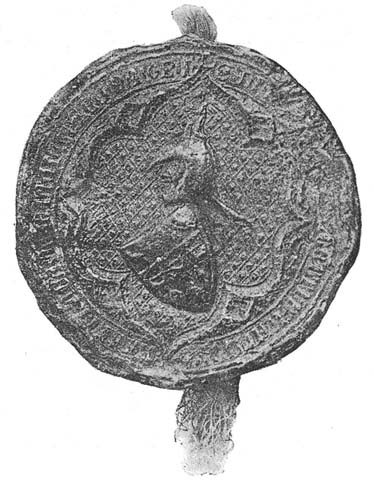
- Seal of William Drugeth

Palatine of Hungary
- Reign: 1334–1342
- Predecessor: John Drugeth
- Successor: Nicholas Zsámboki
- Born: 1300s
- Died: September 1342; Visegrád, Hungary
- Buried: St. Anne Chapel, Sáros Castle (?)
- Noble family: House of Drugeth
- Spouse: Maria Follia
- Issue: daughters
- Father: John Drugeth
- Mother: Pasqua de Bononensi

William Drugeth (also Druget, Hungarian: Druget Vilmos, Slovak: Viliam Druget, Ukrainian: Вілмош Другет; 1300s – September 1342) was a distinguished Neapolitan-born Hungarian baron and military leader in the first half of the 14th century. Along with his family, he was a courtier of Clementia of Hungary, Queen consort of France since his childhood. Upon the invitation of Charles I of Hungary, William arrived to Hungary in 1327, inheriting his uncle, Philip's wealth, who died without male descendants in that year. In the same time, William's father John Drugeth succeeded him as Palatine of Hungary.

As a foreigner, William also inherited his uncle's large-scale province in Northeast Hungary, instantly becoming the richest and most powerful magnate in the Kingdom of Hungary. He retained this social status towards the second half of the reign of Charles. After his father's departure to Naples and subsequent death, William also elevated as Deputy Palatine from 1333 to 1334, then Palatine of Hungary from 1334 until his death, further extending his political power and enormous wealth, which, however, also increased the number of his enemies within the royal court. At the peak of his power, William ruled over nine counties and twenty-three castles, and his province territorially exceeded even the "office fiefs" of the Voivode of Transylvania and the Ban of Slavonia. Charles I died in July 1342. A couple of weeks later, William also died in early September, which heavily affected the fate of the Drugeth family, after the new monarch Louis I – under the influence of their opponents – decided to abolish the Drugeth Province, deprive the dignity Palatine from them and confiscate overwhelming majority of their wealth, ignoring William's last will and testament.

== Early life ==
William (or Willerm) was born in the 1300s as the eldest son of John I Drugeth and Pasqua de Bononensi. The Drugeth family belonged to those Neapolitan elite of Ultramontane (French or Provençal) origin, who arrived to Apulia (Southern Italy) with Charles I of Anjou in 1266. By the first decade of the 14th century, brothers Philip and John – William's father – were considered as the most important members of the family. While John entered the service of Clementia, briefly Queen consort of France and Navarre, Philip joined the accompaniment of Clementia's brother Charles in the journey to Hungary, where laid claim to the throne and successfully acquired it by 1310.

John and his wife, Pasqua were important courtiers of Queen Clementia, who resided in her household at Paris (except for some years in Aix-en-Provence) after she became widow following her husband Louis X's death in 1316. William and his siblings – Nicholas I, John II, Philip II and Clementia – grew up together in the queenly court. In her last will and testament (1328), Queen Clementia referred to William as her shield bearer, a relatively minor dignity for squires in her court. By his arrival to Hungary in 1327, William married Italian noblewoman Maria Follia. His last will in 1330 referred to her as "demoiselle" (Latin: domicella), consequently their wedding occurred shortly before that. They were childless at the time of compilation of the document. After 1330, the marriage produced two or more daughters, but William had no male descendants at the time of his death.

== Lord of Northeast Hungary ==
=== A newcomer baron ===
Philip Drugeth's health had deteriorated by the middle of 1327. He died either in June or July. Shortly after (or before) his death, his brother John I and his nephews – William, Nicholas I and John II – were invited from Naples to Hungary in order to inherit his wealth and power. William and his wife already resided in Hungary in August 1327, when he inherited his uncle's large-scale province in the northeastern part of the kingdom in accordance with the king's decision. Formally, Philip's possessions (personal wealth) were reverted to the Crown, but Charles I made William as the new owner, when he renewed and transcribed the previous land donations to him. William was inducted to his new properties in February 1328. This document itemizes his inherited (i.e. not "office fief" or honor) estates (iure perpetuo). Accordingly, when Philip died, William instantly became the owner of the following castles and possessions with its accessories: the castle of Lubló and the nearby town Podolin in Szepes County (present-day Stará Ľubovňa and Podolínec in Slovakia, respectively), the castle of Palocsa (Plaveč) with six villages, Bertót (Bertotovce), Újfalu (Vámosújfalu, present-day Chminianska Nová Ves), Frics (Fričovce), Hedri (Hendrichovce), Siroka (Široké), Vitézfalva (Víťaz) in Sáros County, the castle of Parics with the village Terebes (Trebišov, Slovakia), along with the castles of Barkó and Jeszenő in Zemplén County (present-day Brekov and Jasenov in Slovakia, respectively).

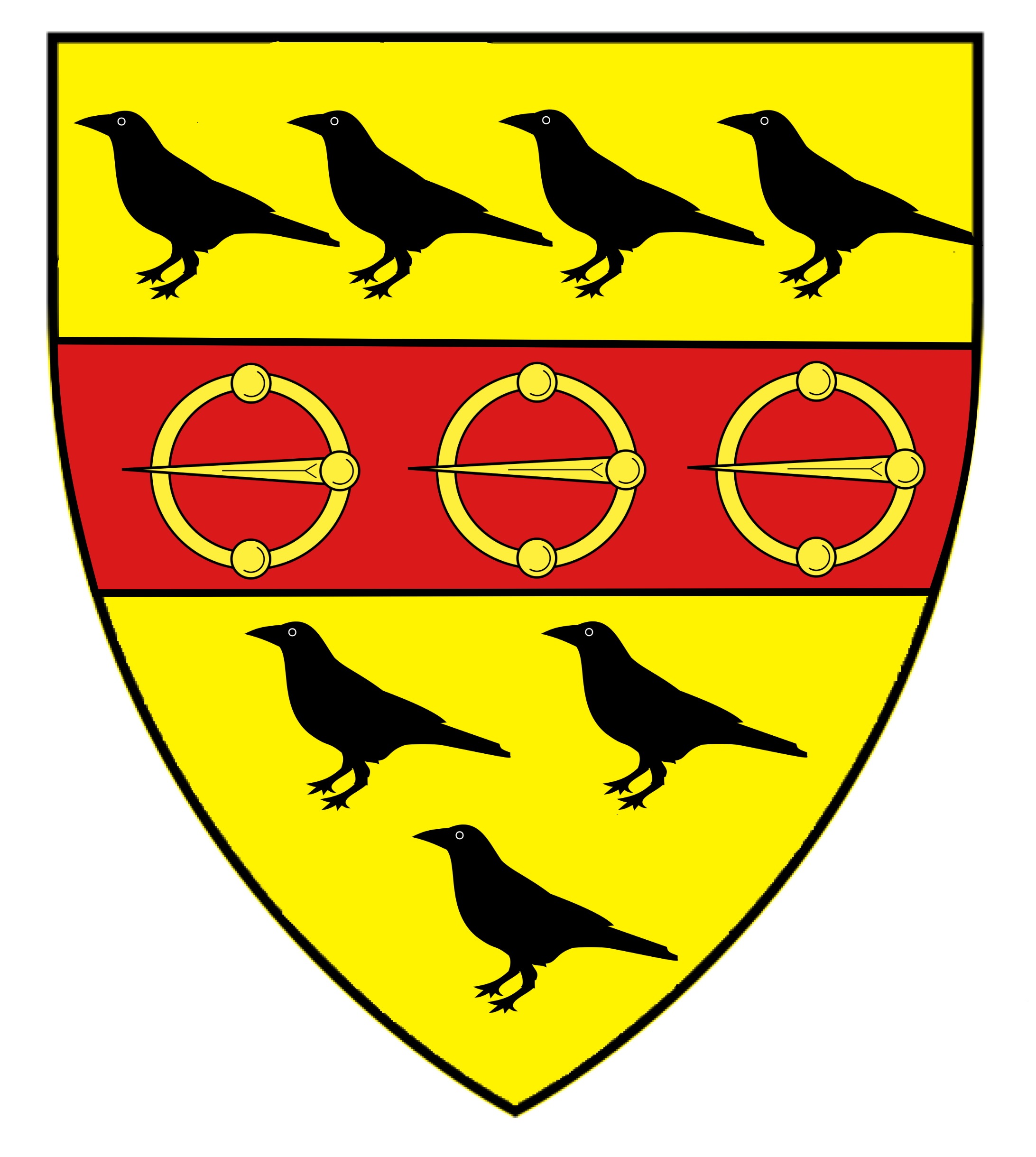
Coat-of-arms of the Drugeth family

In addition to this, William also inherited additional twenty-four possessions in Zemplén County from his uncle: Peticse (Ptičie), Kemence (Kamenica nad Cirochou), Szinna (Snina), Tavarna (Tovarné), Sztakcsin (Stakčínska Roztoka), Zubna (Zubné), Papfalva (Papín), Jankóc (Jankovce), Hankóc (Hankovce), Lácfalva (Lackovce), Hazsina (Hažín nad Cirochou), Homonna (Humenné), Porubka (Krajná Porúbka), Göröginye (Ohradzany), Kajna (Slovenská Kajňa), Lukasóc (Lukačovce), Holcsikóc (Holčíkovce), Pihnye (Pichne) Vadna, Tankafalva, Plempnafalva and Kepla, later all belonged to the Homonna lordship in present-day Slovakia (the last four villages are unidentified), in addition to Salamon (Solomonovo, Ukraine) and Záhony in the southeast part of the county.

More prominently, William took over the governance of those counties, which were belonged to the "office fiefs" of his late uncle. Consequently, he became ispán of Szepes, Abaúj (or Újvár), Borsod, Gömör, Heves and – plausibly – Torna counties since the second half of 1327, according to historian Pál Engel. In accordance with the honor system, numerous royal castles – which mostly secured his revenues – and its accessories were also assigned to William's province in Northeast Hungary ("pro honore" estates). William became castellan of the castles of Szepes (Spiš) in Szepes County, Füzér, Regéc, Gönc, Boldogkő, Jászó (Jasov), Somodi (Drienovec) in Abaúj County, Dédes and Diósgyőr in Borsod County and Szádvár in Torna County. William also took over his uncle's honors outside the Drugeth Province; the castles of Fülek (Fiľakovo) in Nógrád County, Makovica (Zborov) and Szokoly (Sokoľ) in Sáros County. Regarding his inherited personal wealth and "office fiefs", the newcomer and young William Drugeth instantly elevated as one of the most powerful barons in the Kingdom of Hungary, despite his foreign origin and the lack of political and social antecedents. Meanwhile, his father John succeeded Philip as Palatine of Hungary, the most prestigious position in the royal court. After Philip's death, the arriving Drugeth kinship owed their rise and positions of power exclusively by the grace of the king, at that time they were not yet embedded to the native Hungarian nobility, which later became a source of many tensions. In the subsequent years, William gradually expanded his territorial province and private equity, simultaneously.

=== Drugeth Province ===
Still in the first half of 1328, Charles also transferred the authority to William in Sáros County – where he owned lands in a hereditary right and two castles as honors too –, together with its most important namesake fort. Following his father's death in 1334, William succeeded him as Palatine of Hungary. In the same time, he took over the governance of Ung and Zemplén counties, where a significant portion of his private property laid. Charles I attached Patak Castle – without the town – in Zemplén County (near Sátoraljaújhely) to William's office fief in the same year. This could be a compensation for him, because, shortly before, the monarch retook Diósgyőr Castle and donated to his wife, Queen Elizabeth of Poland. Following that the castle became permanent holiday residence for the queens of Hungary. At the end of his life, the castle of Sirok in Heves County was given to the Drugeth Province in 1339. In 1342, the year of his death, William possessed twenty-three castles; within the border of his province thirteen pro honore and nine castles possessed by the right of inheritance and only one outside of his province, the fort of Fülek in Nógrád County, a pro honore possession. The Drugeth Province in Northeast Hungary was comparable with the historical regions Transylvania and Slavonia in its size, the number of counties and forts and its institutions at the peak of William's career. Similarly to his uncle's title until the holding the position of Palatine, William initially governed his province as the ispán of these counties with the increased jurisdiction of "royal judge" (Hungarian: királybíró) received extra power and have been given the authority of the position of Palatine in their respected territories. After himself was appointed Palatine too in 1334, William abandoned this title. William was among those appointed noble judges in May 1330, who has ruled over the kindred Záh, which one of notable members, Felician Záh had attempted to assassinate the royal family on 17 April 1330 in Visegrád (his son, Nicholas was one of those courtiers, who defended the lives of the young princes).

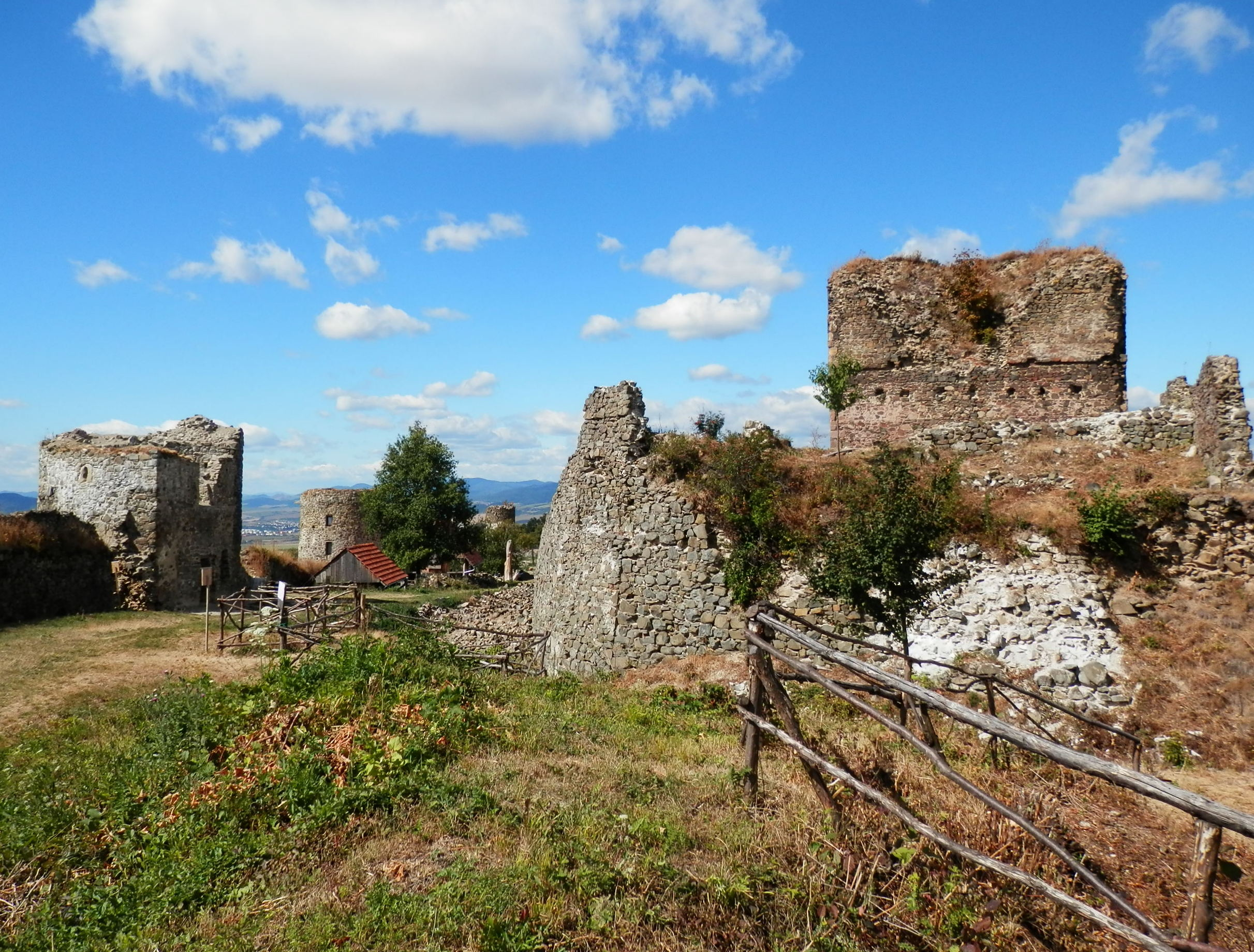
The ruins of Šariš (Sáros) Castle, an early permanent residence of William Drugeth in Northeast Hungary (present-day Slovakia)

During the first phase – until 1333/34 – of his reign as lord of Northeast Hungary, William mostly resided in his permanent seat Sáros Castle, which functioned practically as the capital of the province. He stored his charters – royal donations, privilege letters, appointment documents etc. – in Gönc, while his treasury was located in the fortress of Regéc. His personal residence was in Terebes. In Szepes County, the core territory of the Drugeth Province, two privileges groups, the Zipser Germans and the ten-lanced nobles tenaciously defended their previously acquired privileges against William's efforts in order to integrate them into the administrative institution of the province. Unlike his uncle, William did not recognize their privileges, territorial and judicial separation. As ispán of Szepes County, he clearly considered the two groups to be under his jurisdiction, and violently drew them under his suzerainty. After their complaints, Charles I warned William that his deputy – vice-ispán Peter of Siena – should not force the Saxons under his judgment in 1330. A similar violation was recorded in 1336. During a prolonged lawsuit between the provost of Szepes and the settlers of Szepesváralja (Spišské Podhradie) in 1338–39, the litigants did not recognize William's right of jurisdiction in the case, and they brought the case to Lőcse (Levoča), instead of Szepes Castle, where William intended to settle the conflict. Exceptionally, Charles did not support William in his effort to eliminate the privileged territories in his province, and in the absence of royal support he had to acquiesce to this, at most he could only push the superiors of the two groups into the background. Despite that Charles I did not give any settlement full municipal privileges in the territory of the Drugeth Province, because of the maximization of the royal income. Only Gölnicbánya (Gelnica) and Szomolnokbánya (Smolník) had mining town privileges until the abolition of the Drugeth Province in Northeast Hungary. At the discretion of William, he had control over all royal income during the administration of the province. For instance, he provided relief from duty for certain goods to burghers of Eperjes (Prešov) in 1331.

The Court of Vizsoly, the judicial body of the Drugeth Province, continued its activity after Philip's death and William's succession. A faithful familiaris, Nicholas Perényi maintained his position of vice-judge of the court until 1334. There was a change in the function of the court when William was appointed Deputy Palatine in 1333. The Court of Vizsoly has now also ruled in cases outside the province, for instance in Bihar County. Nicholas Perényi practically served as the deputy palatine's vice-palatine in this context. After William was made Palatine in 1334, he appointed a "rural" vice-palatine to his province – James, son of Denis – and himself administered the province from Vizsoly, abolishing the court. This resulted in an extension of the time of the decision-making service, as the deadlines were adjusted to when William resided in the province. Historian Attila Zsoldos argues William decided to abolish the court, because he convened regular assemblies ("congregatio generalis") for the counties of the province, considering the coexistence of the two authorities as unnecessary. After a five-year hiatus, the Court of Vizsoly was re-established in the summer of 1339. Izsép Ruszkai became vice-judge of the court; he was mentioned in this capacity from 1339 to 1341. Similarly to his predecessor, Ruszkai judged over cases in the counties of the Drugeth Province, with a few exceptions of his involvement in other counties (including Bihar in 1341, where William, however, was possessor of its "empty" honor following the death of Demetrius Nekcsei). Zsoldos considers William reconstituted the Court of Vizsoly, after he moved his permanent seat to the royal capital Visegrád in the spring of 1337, which resulted in an increasingly rare personal presence in his province thereafter. However, the court had never regained its long-standing operation at that time, and its jurisdiction was constantly eroded. Zsoldos considers the Court of Vizsoly de facto ceased to exist by late 1341. This is also not independent from the fact that the completion of the palatinal court in Nagymaros occurred in the same year and simultaneously with the withering of the Court of Vizsoly. Before the researches of Attila Zsoldos, earlier academic works stated the court of Vizsoly was equivalent to the "rural" palatinal court after 1334, consequently there were two parallel palatinal courts with permanent seats in Óbuda (then Visegrád) and Vizsoly.

William inherited a large number of household from his uncle, an existing professional staff thus formed. Beside Nicholas Perényi, notary Matthias also continued his service under William. He was appointed castellan of Füzér in 1340, as a reward for decades of notarial work. Several other members belonged to his personal court, including drayman Nicholas, stablemen Paul and Kolynus, valet Walter and chaplain Benedict, who was also parson of Forró, and steward Lucas. His personal physician was Meynard. Among his vice-ispáns and castellans, several members of his staff already served Philip in this capacity; among them were Michael, son of Lampert, Lucas "the German" and brothers Blaise and John Fonyi. Beside that, William was accompanied in 1327 to Hungary by several confidants of Italian descent from their native land. One of them was Gery "the Italian" ("Gallicus"), who functioned as treasurer of the province in 1330. Another confidant was magister Perroto, also originated from Naples. John "the Italian" served as castellan of Boldogkő from 1335 to 1342 – however, he perhaps originated from local Italian or Walloon (Latinus) community, which was widespread in the Szepes region. Another familiares Simoneth and the aforementioned Kolynus were also of possible Italian origin. Brothers Peter and Nicholas were goldsmiths by their craft and they originated from Siena (the sons of a certain Simon). Peter served as vice-ispán of Szepes County and castellan of Lubló (William's hereditary possession) from 1327 to 1335. Following his death, his brother Nicholas succeeded him in both positions, holding those until 1342, William's death. While other Italian members of the household – including Gery and Perroto – returned to their homeland after a time, Peter and Nicholas settled down permanently, their sister Joanna also arrived to Hungary together with her children sometime later. After John Drugeth's death, some of his familiares – e.g. God Ellési – also entered the service of William. Overall, the social status of William's familiares was already higher than in his uncle's time. After the consolidation of royal power, the service of the province was more attractive to members of illustrious local families than before.

=== Acquisitions ===
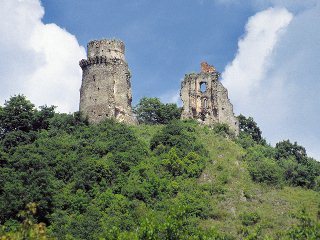
William Drugeth acquired the fort of Slanec (Szalánc) in 1330

As lord of the Drugeth Province, William exploited his status unscrupulously in order to increase his own personal wealth, acquiring hereditary possessions (iure perpetuo), which mostly laid in the territory of his province, but not exclusively. William was granted one of his honors, the castle of Szokoly in a hereditary right by Charles I sometime between 1328 and 1330, after Sáros County was attached to the Drugeth Province. After his father John died in 1334, William also inherited his personal possessions in Ung and Zemplén counties. Despite Hungarian customary law, the inheritance was not shared among the brothers (William, Nicholas and John Jr.), exercising the principle of primogeniture, which had characterized the social structure in Western Europe. Consequently, William became the owner of Nevicke Castle (present-day Nevytske, Ukraine) and its accessories, the villages of Nagykapos and Mocsár (present-day Veľké Kapušany and Močiar in Slovakia, respectively), in addition to the village of Zemplén (today Zemplín, Slovakia) with its fair, and Göbölfalva (also Schreibersdorf, today Buglovce, Slovakia) in Szepes County. Beyond the royal donations and heritages of Philip and John's fortune, William increased the number of his estates to the detriment of neighboring owners. Although, summarizing the evolution of his private wealth, there were some complaints against his efforts to acquire lands in his province, compared to some of his contemporaries – for instance, Mikcs Ákos –, he was not to be considered a violent landlord at all. Based on a former dispute between Philip Drugeth and the Görgei family in Szepes County, William Drugeth filed a lawsuit against them regarding their estates in 1329. The lawsuit ended with a forced settlement; the Görgeis had to give up the estates of Kistoporc (Toporec), Kislomnic (Lomnička) and Beles in favor of William. Thereafter, the Görgei family petitioned to the royal court, and through the mediation of the king they redeemed their three ancient possessions from William for 352 marks of valuable fabrics in 1330.

It was a much more lasting acquisition of property for William, when local strongman Kakas Tarkői pledged his estates – Ófalu (Spišská Stará Ves, Slovakia), Mátyásvágása (Matiašovce, Slovakia), Nedec (Niedzica, Poland) and Fridmannvágása (Frydman, Poland) – along the river Dunajec in the northernmost part of Szepes County in early 1328. Kakas died shortly thereafter, still in that year. Under the pressure of William, the Chapter of Szepes (Spišská Kapitula) transcribed the pledge certificate. In another document issued by the chapter, the heirs of Kakas Tarkői complained that William wants to force the said estates to become his property permanently. They stated if they are to transfer the property, they will do so only because of their fear of William's "indignation". A later document, however, nuances the situation; accordingly King Charles confiscated these lands from the Tarkői family because of Kakas' huge debts and "other offenses", and handed over to William Drugeth, excluding the brothers of Kakas from the heritage. William built his fortified stone castle at his own expense in the estate of Nedec (present-day in the southernmost part of Poland) by 1330 – in his last will in that year, he referred to the fort as his "new castle".

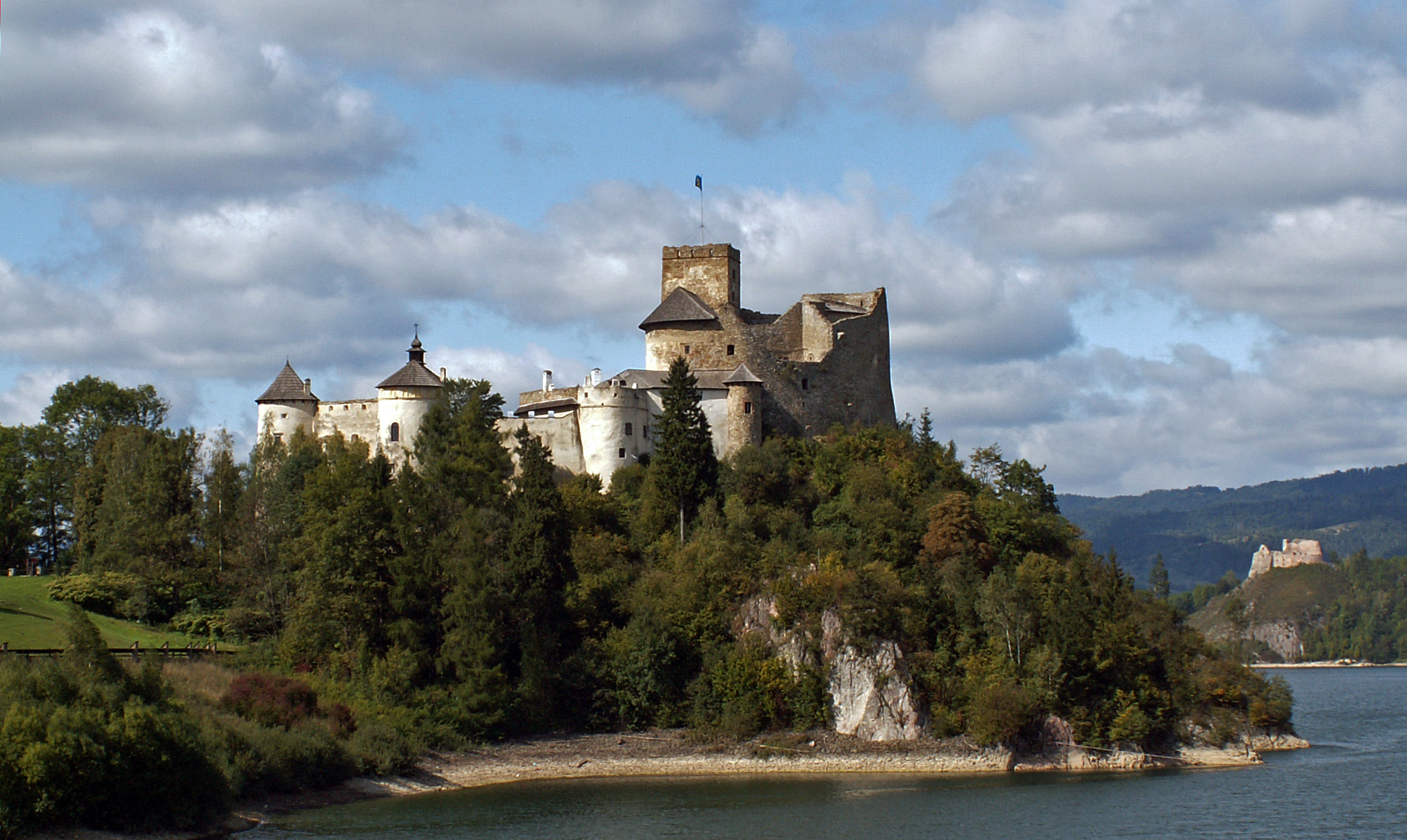
Dunajec Castle in present-day Poland, built by William Drugeth shortly before 1330

William exchanged his aforementioned inherited six villages in Szepes County for the castle of Szalánc (Slanec, Slovakia) in Abaúj County with the Szalánci family of the once prestigious Aba clan in 1330. After violent and coercive attempts, William also bought the estates of the Somosi family of the same kindred in Sáros County in 1332 – he acquired the villages Miklósvágása (Miklušovce), Szedlice (Sedlice), Szopotnyica and Szopotnyicafő in the process. When Dominic Nádasdi from the Aba clan died without male heirs, William petitioned to the royal court for his lordship, which consisted of twelve possessions to the east of Kassa (Košice) in Abaúj and Sáros counties. Charles fulfilled his request in 1335, thus William became the owner of Nádasd (Trstené pri Hornáde), Zsadány (Ždaňa), Szkáros (Skároš), Alsócsáj (Nižný Čaj), Felsőcsáj (Vyšný Čaj; as well as another estate laid between the two), Ósva (Olšovany), Bogdány (Bohdanovce), Lengyelfalva (Košická Polianka), Felnádasd (Trsťany), a portion in Széplak (Krásna) and Luzsány (today part of Kojatice), present-day all locate in Slovakia. Following a successful litigation of Dominic's widow (Clara, daughter of the late Dózsa Debreceni) and sisters, William was forced to return some estates – Alsócsáj, Felsőcsáj and Ósva – to them in 1337. William also acquired the village of Újlak (Novosad) in Zemplén County at some time, possibly after the death of his father. William unsuccessfully tried to seize the Balog lordship in Gömör County in 1336, when captured and imprisoned its lord Doncs Balog, who himself was the nephew of Felician Záh, who attempted to assassinate the royal family six years earlier. William requested Charles to grant his lordship, which consisted of eight possessions, but he was confronted with this step with the Szécsi family of the Balog clan, who were also strong confidants of the Hungarian monarch. Finally, William was forced to retreat.

He also possessed some lands outside Northeast Hungary. According to his last will and testament from 1330, he owned Újbécs ("New Vienna"), a settlement north of Pest and some unidentified lands in Szatmár County. He also inherited Besenyő in Pest County from his uncle Philip. He donated the village to one of his familiares, Peter, son of Körös in 1337. One year later, William was granted Pécel in the same county by Charles, but soon he handed over to Peter too in 1338. Following William moved his permanent seat to the capital Visegrád in the spring of 1337, he bought several real estates and palaces in the town. He also leased some estates – for instance, Kajászó and Solymár – for ten years from the Dominican nuns of the Margaret Island, which laid near Visegrád in the neighboring Nógrád, Esztergom and Fejér counties.

=== Personal assets and business interests ===
His last will and testament from 1330 provides a number of additions to his financial situation, religiosity and business interests. He compiled the testament during a preparation of his military campaign to the Kingdom of Poland (see below). He announced his testament in Sáros Castle on 9 August 1330, where he designated as the heir of all of his possessions his younger brother Nicholas, again under the principle of primogeniture (i.e. the youngest brother John II was excluded from the inheritance). He requested Charles to become the executer of the testament. During the first half of the 14th century, the Hungarian nobility was not in the habit of writing a last testament; possessions were divided among the sons and other branches of the families by the customary law. The document indicated William's origin, its tone and form the testament did not differ from the testaments of the aristocracy in those Western European countries, which fully adopted Roman law. William had no children in the autumn of 1330, and fearing the likelihood of losing his estates made him name his brother to be heir.

In addition to 1000 marks of fine silver, William bequeathed 32 pieces of luxurious silverware, a gold crown decorated with jewels (worth 100 marks), three silver belts, a gilded cross with precious stones, an unspecified amount of jewelry and 29 bales of costly silk fabrics woven with gold to his wife, Maria Follia. According to art historian Ágnes Kurcz, these items do not just reveal the wealth of the Drugeth family, but also show their sense of refinement and the quality of life, which distinguished them from the other noble families in Hungary. In the document, William also confessed his previous "sins", including dominations against the possessions of neighboring lords, the imprisonment of John, the villicus of Lőcse and that he had hanged Perengerius, the judge of Gölnicbánya in his wrath, even though he deserved his fate anyway. He also ordered the Görgei family to be compensated from his property in order to settle their previously detailed conflict. His religiosity also appeared in the document; he allocated funds to the church where his body will be buried, in addition to those churches where prayers will be said for his spiritual salvation.

William's seals were preserved from 1328, 1329, 1334, 1337, 1340 and 1342. After his appointment as Palatine of Hungary, he began to use hanging seal with a depiction of portrait portrayal seeking authenticity with a crest decoration of angel holding a horseshoe. The portrait depiction, which is probably intended to capture William's face, can be traced back to early 14th-century Italian origin, resembling the face of Dante Alighieri. Ágnes Kurcz considered the depiction of angel with horseshoe expresses loyalty to the Capetian House of Anjou, which also represented themselves with horseshoes and ostriches on the crest of their coat-of-arms. Kurcz also argued William's seals were designed and prepared by his familiares, the goldsmiths Peter and Nicholas of Siena.

Continuing Philip's effort, William settled German (Saxon) immigrants to his rarely inhabited possessions in Szepes County. For instance, in 1329, he granted liberties to soltész officials in two villages, Giermp (Jarabina) and Őr (Strážky, today a borough of Spišská Belá), both belonged to the Lubló lordship. His familiares – for example, God Ellési, the castellan of Nevicke – also invited Ruthenians to the Drugeth landholdings in Ung County. William appointed bailiffs to administrate and manage those possessions, which did not belong to any castle lordships in his province. Beside his possessions and taxes and revenues associated, William also had diversified business interests. According to his last will, he leased tithes in Buda and was involved in the prosperous wine trade in Syrmia, associated with a local burgher, Raphael, a goldsmith. However, in addition to income, William also accumulated debt during the activity. During a contract with his unidentified creditor, Arnold, the judge of Kassa vouched for him. In 1332, William also entered into a contract with Csanád Telegdi, Archbishop of Esztergom, a long-time friend and ally of the Drugeth family, in order to lease the one-third portion of mining revenues (urbura) at Rozsnyóbánya (Rožňava). William had a share in the revenues of the silver mining at Szomolnokbánya too. In his last will, he provided this income as collateral to settle any debts after his death. In the document, he entrusted his servants, magister Fricskó and Gery the Italian to pay off the creditors in the allotted time, in addition to financial beneficiaries – his wife, Gery himself, Perroto, notary Matthias, his personal servitor Walter, other servants, draymen, shield bearers etc. – of his will from this revenue, which was worth at least 370 marks. Additionally, he also provided the custom duties at Lubló, if the aforementioned payments were not covered by his assets. William had business ties with ispán Wulving, a wealthy merchant in Buda.

== Deputy Palatine ==
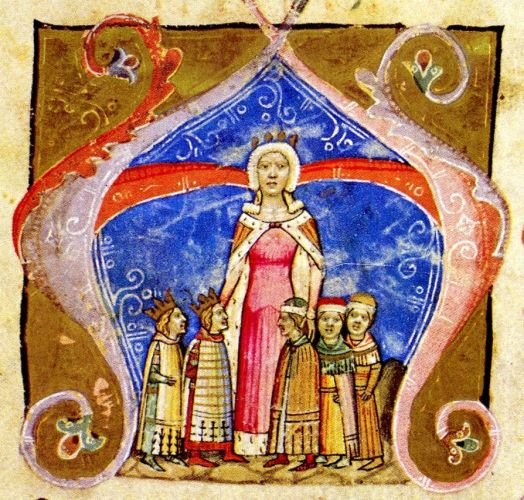
Queen Elizabeth with her children, as depicted in the Illuminated Chronicle

After years of negotiations, Charles visited his uncle, Robert, in Naples in the summer of 1333. Because of his existing relationships in his homeland, John Drugeth also escorted his monarch – despite palatines often substituted the kings during their absence for foreign military campaigns. During his absence, John's son William Drugeth was appointed Deputy Palatine of Hungary, an entirely unique position in the kingdom, and also took over the governance of his father's counties and castles in this capacity. Due to his so far unknown position, his dignity did not have a uniform title. William was referred to as "palatine" by the chapter of Lelesz (Leles) in May 1333. He was styled himself as "palatine and judge of the Cumans" in late July – possibly an arbitrary adoption of his title in his province –, and later "deputy palatine" (Latin: vices gerens palatini) in early September. The monastery of Váradelőhegy (today part of Oradea, Romania) titled him "vice-palatine". His close associates, including Nicholas Perényi, also referred to him as "deputy palatine". Queen Elizabeth, however, did not recognize his dignity and she called him simply ispán of Szepes and Újvár counties in her letter of command.

Despite his formal title, William did not play a serious role in the central government of the kingdom in the absence of the king. In contrast, Queen Elizabeth took the initiative and began to issue commands and measures – for instance, in August, she entrusted Thomas Szécsényi, the Voivode of Transylvania, and Ladislaus Jánki, the Archbishop of Kalocsa to transcribe a donation letter as appointed judges for Pozsony and Nyitra counties. According to a document from November, the queen learned that public security had deteriorated in several parts of the country since the king left, as a result Judge royal Paul Nagymartoni ordered the convening of county assemblies to compile a list of "evildoers", the first deadline was early October. Charles was still in Dalmatia when Elizabeth had already reported the turmoil, thus Zsoldos considers these reports were unfounded and were fabricated to blacken William before the king, who was still on the border of the realm during that time. William's rapid political rise irritated the old Angevin Hungarian elite, who fought Charles' unifying wars against the oligarchs in the previous decades. Already the appointment of John Drugeth as Palatine caused a break in the elite unity, but the selection of William, who had no antecedents in Hungary, as royal governor has finally brought the opposition to the surface. This measure provoked the jealousy of some of the oldest among the partisans of king Charles. Among them, Thomas Szécsényi felt most marginalized. He was a confidant and – through his second marriage from 1332 – relative of Queen Elizabeth, who opposed the Neapolitan thread. The queen and Szécsényi sent Paul Nagymartoni to the military camp of Charles near Topusko. There, the Judge royal presented the fabricated charges against William. The single most important consideration for Charles must have been the tranquillity of the kingdom. In order to maintain peace at Hungary during his absence, the king gave in to pressure; although William was allowed to retain his title of Deputy Palatine, but without real power and jurisdiction, the effective control of the country was conceded to his opponents.

== Palatine ==
Charles I and his escort returned to Hungary by March 1334. William was first styled as Palatine of Hungary on 17 May, consequently his father, John Drugeth was deceased by then. William was appointed to that position shortly before, as his seal was not ready then. Whether John returned to Hungary with his king in early 1334 or remained in Naples, is unknown. His appointment also proves that the Hungarian king only temporarily, for tactical reasons, yielded to pressure from his wife and her confidants. Upon his return, realizing his original intention, he appointed his dearest, main favorite baron William to fill the most important secular position in the realm. Following in his father's footsteps, William maintained the palatinal court in Óbuda, where he also functioned as castellan, just like his father. In the latter capacity, he seized and confiscated a mill at Budafelhévíz (also a borough of present-day Budapest). However, William did not succeed his father in his ispánates in Transdanubia – Fejér, Tolna and Somogy counties –, which laid outside his province at Northeast Hungary. William was present at the Congress of Visegrád in October–November 1335.

As Palatine, William convened palatinal assemblies (Latin: generalis congregatio) initially only for the counties of the eastern part of the Kingdom of Hungary. In his first year, he held and chaired assemblies at Bihar, Szabolcs, Bereg, Zemplén, Ung, Abaúj and Sáros counties. In the late spring and early summer of 1335, William made a tour to the western and northwestern part of the country; he summoned assemblies and judged over lawsuits in Nógrád, Hont, Bars, Pozsony, Moson, Sopron, Gömör, Zala and Veszprém counties. In the autumn of the same year, he again visited his province and its catchment area; assemblies were held in Bihar, Kraszna, Szatmár, Ugocsa, Szabolcs, Bereg, Zemplén, Ung, Heves, Torna and Borsod counties, while his vice-palatine, James, son of Denis also organized an event in Gömör County. Subsequent county assemblies were mostly focused only on his own province in Northeast Hungary. In 1341 there was another series of general assemblies, during which William first visited the counties of the eastern part of the country, and then visited the western counties again for this purpose through Upper Hungary (Zala, Veszprém, Győr, Komárom, Pozsony and Moson counties). The place of these assemblies was neither constant. Sometimes it changed every year, but some villages or towns became permanent locations for years. These assemblies were held for one or two, or rarely even three counties. Some counties had constant pair, for example Szabolcs and Bereg, Bihar and Kraszna, Pest and Pilis, Nógrád and Hont, Szatmár and Ugocsa, Zemplén and Ung, Trencsén and Nyitra. During this period general assemblies lasted for at least 4–6 days. William's personal activity covered only the northern half of the kingdom, but in addition to the general assemblies, in some cases he was also involved in litigation in the other part of the country as a judge, for example at the 1336–38 lawsuit of the Dominican nuns of the Margaret Island in Esztergom County. In practice, William's jurisdiction also covered the entire Western Hungary up to the Drava line, but the voivode of Transylvania, and the bans of Slavonia and Macsó exercised autonomous judicial powers in their respected territories. William also recognized the judicial privilege of the Pannonhalma Abbey in 1335, which guaranteed to the Benedictine monks that they cannot be cited before a judicial forum other than the king. William functioned as the paramount appeal forum of the privileged groups of Pechenegs, but rarely had to resort to this role. William usually confirmed his verdicts at the general assemblies with his signet ring. At times, his deputies also used his insignia.

William moved his palatinal court from Óbuda to Visegrád – the capital of the Kingdom of Hungary – in the spring of 1337, but a small branch office remained in Óbuda until around 1340. He possessed several houses and palaces in the town of Visegrád. Sometime between October 1340 and September 1341 – after his final departure from the settlement –, he was also replaced as castellan of Óbuda by Stephen Sáfár, according to historian Attila Zsoldos. Since then, William visited his province in Northeast Hungary less and less frequently. Several historians, including Imre Hajnik and Lajos Nyers, interpreted that the relocation of the court to Visegrád meant the abolition of an independent palatine administrative and judicial court and it has been integrated into the royal courts of justice. They put these changes after the death of Charles I. Modern historians – Enikő Spekner, Attila Zsoldos and Tibor Szőcs – disputed this view. Parts of the court were relocated to Nagymaros opposite the capital Visegrád due to its wide-ranging nature of personal staff and proceedings. in his absence, substitute signet rings and seals were used in order to enshrine the verdicts at his court in Óbuda, then Visegrád and Nagymaros, with the transcription "sigillum magistri Vyllermi Drugeth comitis vices gerens palatini pro caus[is]…". Nagymaros also proved to be only a temporary court center in 1340 and 1341, when William stayed in abroad for extended periods of time. After his return to Visegrád in late 1341, his permanent personal presence made a separate judicial forum obsolete.

== Military service ==
As a newcomer, William participated in the war against the Habsburgs in the summer of 1328, when the Hungarian and Bohemian troops invaded Austria and routed the Austrian army on the banks of the Leitha River. Along with his father John – who was still without court position during that time –, William was one of the signatories of the Treaty of Bruck, in which Charles I signed a peace treaty with the three dukes of Austria (Frederick the Fair, Albert the Lame, and Otto the Merry) on 21 September 1328.

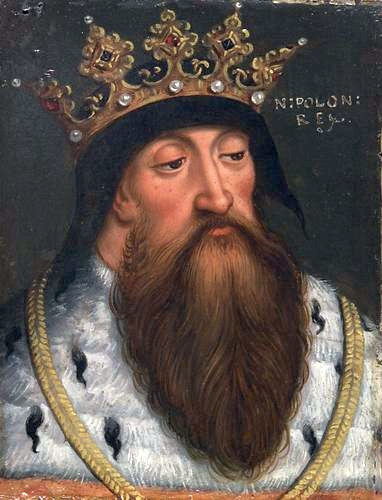
Władysław I the Elbow-high (painted by Anton Boys)

Alliance with his father-in-law, Władysław I the Elbow-high, King of Poland, became a permanent element of Charles' foreign policy in the 1320s. During the Polish–Teutonic War for the suzerainty over Pomerelia, Charles sent Hungarian auxiliary troops commanded by William Drugeth in the autumn of 1330 in order to support Władysław in his war against the Teutonic Order. Beyond his status of without a male heir, this was the other reason why William drafted his last will and testament in that year, in his late twenties. He also turned to Pope John XXII expressing his wish to be buried in the Saint Anne chapel in Szedikert (Záhradné) near Sáros Castle. Contemporary or near-contemporary Prussian (Teutonic) chroniclers – Peter of Dusburg and Wigand of Marburg – described William as a well-respected and influential figure of the events during the campaign. Peter of Dusburg stated that William's Hungarian contingent consisted of 8,000 men. The Polish and Hungarian troops pillaged the Kulmerland of Teutonic Prussia up to the Osa River near Grudziądz. These maneuvers were followed by series of counterattacks by the Teutonics. Through the mediation of the Bohemian king John and the Hungarian king Charles I, the Grand Master of the Teutonic Order Werner von Orseln signed a truce with Władysław I on 18 October 1330. According to Wigand of Marburg, "the pagan" William Drugeth escorted the Grand Master to the Polish royal camp. Following that the Hungarian troops returned to home in the following months, but over the next year, the fighting continued until the Battle of Płowce.

Ten years later, in 1340, William led a Hungarian contingent in the Galicia–Volhynia Wars, in order to provide assistance to Charles' brother-in-law, Casimir III of Poland in his fought for the throne of the Kingdom of Galicia–Volhynia against the Grand Duchy of Lithuania, and their ally, the Golden Horde. On 15 May 1340, Judge royal Paul Nagymartoni postponed a trial, originally scheduled for 15 May, because two plaintiffs, Peter and Ladislaus Rozgonyi participated in William's campaign. Based on contemporary records, Serbian historian Đura Hardi considers, operation of the Hungarian army in Ruthenia, which was led by William Drugeth, had most likely started after 1 May 1340 and they returned to Visegrád before 11 June; the Hungarian army could have actively been at war for about ten days. William's army fought against the Tatars of the Golden Horde, who even pillaged the north-easternmost corner of the kingdom along the Ruthenian border, where a significant portion of the Drugeths' possessions also laid, as chronicler John of Winterthur reported. The Hungarian royal army caused severe damage in Sáros County when it marched through the area in the direction of Poland.

== Death and aftermath ==
Charles I died in Visegrád on 16 July 1342. His 16-year-old son Louis I ascended the Hungarian throne without resistance five days later. Although Louis had attained the age of majority, his mother Elizabeth exerted a powerful influence on him, which resulted the immediate political marginalization of William Drugeth. This was well reflected by the fact that – according to the Illuminated Chronicle – the queen mother's most important confidant Thomas Szécsényi was that baron, who girded the new monarch with the royal sword during the coronation ceremony, despite William filled the most prestigious secular position in the court. William retired from public life. It is plausible that his health had deteriorated since the end of last year, because his personal physician Meynard began to construct a house on Vilmos' plot in Visegrád to be available to his lord as soon as possible. The last known charter of William was issued in Visegrád on 29 August 1342, but another sources from his province referred to him as a living person until mid-September. In January 1343, his widow Maria Follia stated that William died of a rapid-onset illness. Accordingly, William donated a portion of land in Visegrád to John, the parish priest of Visegrád for his own salvation and his services still in his lifetime, but he could no longer issue a certificate of donation, so the widow made up for it. A royal charter of Louis I from June 1343 mentioned the "orphans" of William. Consequently, two or more daughters were born from the marriage of William Drugeth and Maria Follia after 1330, who were still minors in 1343, but their fate is unknown.

After William's death, his estates in Northeast Hungary ought to pass back to the Crown, as he had no any legitimate male heirs. Under the influence of Queen Elizabeth and Thomas Szécsényi – the "Polish party" –, Louis rejected William's last will and testament from 1330, and his younger brother Nicholas Drugeth was not recognized as his heir. Instead of him, Nicholas Zsámboki was made Palatine of Hungary within weeks, who had held only insignificant positions before that. The Hungarian barons were fed up with the Drugeths because, based on the experiences of the previous decades, they felt they can have only secondary roles compare to them. Louis, who already was born in Hungary, did not have an emotional dimension to the place of origin – Naples – of his family, as a result the Drugeth family no longer enjoyed this special attention. The idea that Nicholas Drugeth should be the next lord of the Drugeth Province was never seriously consider. After a brief power demand of Thomas Szécsényi, the semi-autuonomus province in Northeast Hungary was partitioned and disintegrated by early 1343. The royal court also confiscated the vast majority of the Drugeths' private property. In January 1343, William's brothers Nicholas and John were given back three castles out of the nine that they used to have, and they were virtually pushed back within the territory of Ung and Zemplén counties. Margaret and Maria Follia, the widows of Philip and William Drugeth, respectively, could retain their inherited estates.

== Sources ==
- Engel, Pál (1996). Magyarország világi archontológiája, 1301–1457, I. [Secular Archontology of Hungary, 1301–1457, Volume I] (in Hungarian). História, MTA Történettudományi Intézete. ISBN 963-8312-44-0.
- Hardi, Đura (2012). Drugeti. Povest o usponu i padu porodice pratilaca Anžujskih kraljeva [Drugeths. The History of the Rise and Decline of the Escorts of Angevin Kings] (in Serbo-Croatian (Latin script)). Faculty of Philosophy, University of Novi Sad. ISBN 978-86-6065-108-4.
- Hardi, Đura (2013). "хронологија једног похода палатина виљема другета [The Chronology of a Campaign of Palatine William Drugeth]". Istraživanja: Journal of Historical Researches (in Serbian) (24): 109–118. ISSN 2406-1131.
- Kruták, Anita (2012). "A nádori congregatio intézménye Druget Vilmos nádorsága alatt [The Institution of Congregatio Generalis Palatini during the Office-holding of William Druget]". In Kiss P., Attila; Piti, Ferenc; Szabados, György (eds.). Középkortörténeti tanulmányok 7 (in Hungarian). University of Szeged. pp. 425–438. ISBN 978-963-306-160-2.
- Kurcz, Ágnes (1988). Lovagi kultúra Magyarországon a 13–14. században [Chivalric Culture in Hungary in the 13–14th Centuries] (in Hungarian). Akadémiai Kiadó. ISBN 963-05-4737-6.
- Markó, László (2006). A magyar állam főméltóságai Szent Istvántól napjainkig: Életrajzi Lexikon [Great Officers of State in Hungary from King Saint Stephen to Our Days: A Biographical Encyclopedia] (in Hungarian). Helikon Kiadó. ISBN 963-208-970-7.
- Piti, Ferenc (2006). "Az 1342. évi nádorváltás [The 1342 Change of Palatines]". Századok (in Hungarian). 140 (2). Magyar Történelmi Társulat: 435–442. ISSN 0039-8098.
- Spekner, Enikő (2015). Hogyan lett Buda a középkori Magyarország fővárosa? A budai királyi székhely története a 12. század végétől a 14. század közepéig [How did Buda become the capital of medieval Hungary? The history of the royal seat of Buda from the end of the twelfth century to the middle of the fourteenth] (in Hungarian). Budapesti Történeti Múzeum. ISBN 978-615-5341-19-9.
- Szőcs, Tibor (2014). A nádori intézmény korai története, 1000–1342 [An Early History of the Palatinal Institution: 1000–1342] (in Hungarian). Magyar Tudományos Akadémia Támogatott Kutatások Irodája. ISBN 978-963-508-697-9.
- Zsoldos, Attila (2017). A Druget-tartomány története 1315–1342 [The History of the Druget Province 1315–1342] (in Hungarian). MTA Bölcsészettudományi Kutatóközpont Történettudományi Intézete. ISBN 978-963-4160-63-2.

William House of Drugeth Born: 1300s Died: September 1342
Political offices
Preceded by Philip Drugeth	Lord of the Drugeth Province; 1327–1342	Dissolution
Preceded by John Drugeth	Palatine of Hungary; 1334–1342	Succeeded by Nicholas Zsámboki
