= Maria Follia =

14th century Hungarian noblewoman

- Died: after 1358
- Noble family: House of Drugeth (by marriage)
- Spouse: William Drugeth
- Issue: daughters

Maria Follia (died after 1358) was a Hungarian noblewoman of Italian origin in the 14th century, the wife of William Drugeth, Palatine of Hungary. She was a lady-in-waiting in the court of Elizabeth of Poland, Queen of Hungary.

== Ancestry ==
Similarly to the Drugeth family, Maria Follia (also Folia, Folya or Feulie) originated from a Neapolitan noble family of Ultramontane (French or Provençal) origin, who arrived to the Italian peninsula with Charles I of Anjou in 1266. According to Serbian historian Đura Hardi, two noble families with the surname Follia lived in San Severino in the 1320s, but her family connections beyond this are completely unknown. A certain knight Ernulfus de la Folia was mentioned in 1283, while another lord, Everaldus Follia, and his son Guillelmus de San Severino and a knight Geraldus de Follia were called on to fight by Robert, King of Naples in 1324 in the war against the Kingdom of Aragon, who had seized Sicily from the Angevins. Hardi argues Maria's father or brothers should be sought among the aforementioned noblemen and this implies that her social status was equal to the Drugeth family.

== Marriage to William Drugeth ==
Maria Follia is first appeared in contemporary records on 9 August 1330, when her husband William Drugeth drafted his last will and testament in Sáros Castle, Kingdom of Hungary (present-day Šariš, Slovakia), because he prepared for war against the Teutonic Order. The date of wedding of William and Maria is unknown; it is plausible it occurred, when William's father, John I Drugeth and his family served in the court of the former French queen Clementia, where the young William functioned as the queen's shield bearer and squire. Based on this, it is possible that Maria Follia was also a member of the household of Clementia in Paris and Aix-en-Provence. It seems probable that she arrived to Hungary along with William in the middle of 1327. William's last will in 1330 referred to her as "demoiselle" (Latin: domicella), consequently their wedding occurred shortly before that.

John Drugeth and his family – including the eldest son William – were invited from Naples to Hungary by King Charles I in order to inherit the wealth and power of Philip Drugeth (John's younger brother), who lived in Hungary for decades as the king's most loyal comrade-in-arms, and by the time of his death (June or July 1327) he had risen to be one of the most influential barons. While John succeeded his brother as Palatine of Hungary, William, who was in his twenties, inherited his late uncle's wealth and large-scale province in Northeast Hungary, instantly becoming the richest and most powerful magnate in the Kingdom of Hungary.

In addition to 1000 marks of fine silver, William Drugeth bequeathed to his wife ten large vessels of silver, twelve silver cups with one handle, three silver jugs with a long neck and one large, two smaller and four those for pouring water. Also one golden crown decorated with precious stones in the value of 100 marks of fine silver, eight small salt shakers, ten spoons of silver, ten deep red fabrics with gold plated threads, nineteen deep red silk fabrics, three silver belts, two larger and one smaller, and other jewelry which was taken to the castle of Gönc for safekeeping. Beside that, Maria Follia was to inherit also a large gilded cross decorated with precious stones that are kept in Szepes Castle (Spiš, Slovakia). Historians Ágnes Kurcz and Đura Hardi argued, these items do not just reveal the wealth of the Drugeth family, but also show their sense of refinement and the quality of life, which distinguished them from the other noble families in Hungary. Hardi considered Maria Follia in her look and appearance was a role model in terms of aristocratic fashion and culture of daily life for many ladies and courtiers at the royal court in Visegrád.

== Lady-in-waiting ==
Two months after the death of Charles I, William Drugeth died in early September 1342. In January 1343, his widow Maria Follia stated that William died of a rapid-onset illness. Accordingly, William donated a portion of land in Visegrád to John, the parish priest of Visegrád for his own salvation and his services still in his lifetime, but he could no longer issue a certificate of donation, so the widow made up for it. A royal charter of Louis I of Hungary from June 1343 mentioned the "orphans" of William. Consequently, two or more daughters were born from the marriage of William Drugeth and Maria Follia after 1330, who were still minors in 1343, but their fate is unknown. After William's death, his estates in Northeast Hungary ought to pass back to the Crown, as he had no any legitimate male heirs. Under the influence of Queen Elizabeth and Thomas Szécsényi, Louis rejected William's last will and testament from 1330, and his younger brother Nicholas Drugeth was not recognized as his heir. The semi-autuonomus province in Northeast Hungary was partitioned and disintegrated by early 1343. The royal court also confiscated the vast majority of the Drugeths' private property. As a widow 's allowance, Maria Follia was able to retain Széplak (Krásna) and Nádasd (Trstené pri Hornáde) in Abaúj County (today both villages locate in Slovakia), where she lived thereafter. She also owned two palaces and an estate in Visegrád. The palatinal archives also remained in her possession.

Despite the former political rivalry between Queen Elizabeth and the late William Drugeth, Maria Follia remained in the capital close to the royal family and enjoyed the favor of the queen. She also became a lady-in-waiting in the queenly household of Elizabeth at an unspecified time. It is plausible that Maria Follia distanced herself from her brothers-in-law – Nicholas and John II –, who have lost all their political influence in those months, while Elizabeth and her confidants exerted a powerful influence on the 16-year-old Louis. Hardi considers the queen and Maria Follia became widowed at the same time in 1342, and this might have a prominent factor in their strong relationship despite the fall of the Drugeths. When the queen visited the Kingdom of Naples in the summer of 1343 to promote the interests of her second son, claimant Andrew, who was betrothed to Joanna I, Maria Follia was among the 400 people in her company. She is the only known woman, whose name was preserved by contemporary diplomatic sources as a member of Elizabeth's accompaniment. Đura Hardi argues Maria Follia was perhaps not even among the rare but the only court lady of Elizabeth who fluently understood and spoke the language of the ruling elite in southern Italy. She could be also familiar with the court protocols and the culture of behavior at the Neapolitan royal court. Through her family, she also had direct ties to the local aristocracy. Taking advantage of the diplomatic mission and the confidential relationship with Queen Elizabeth, Maria Follia exercised her alleged widow right to William's family estate in Naples, when she was granted a portion from Pascarola, the main feudal property of the Drugeths, by Queen Joanna in January 1344, upon the intervention of Elizabeth. Hardi emphasizes Maria had no legal right to inherit the feudal estate, in comparison to her late husband's brothers, who did not receive an invitation to accompany Elizabeth on her journey to Naples.

Maria Follia returned from Naples to Hungary together with Queen Elizabeth in May 1344. She lived in her estates in Abaúj County and Visegrád. Some of William's servants remained in her service, for instance Meynard, the personal physician of her late husband, and Giacomino, who served as vice-ispán of Csongrád County, vice-palatine, then vice-castellan of Óbuda under Palatine John Drugeth. A serf from her estate Széplak was mentioned in 1347. According to a charter issued in 1353, Louis I handed over the estate Nádasd to her until for the rest of her life. On 5 June 1358, Maria Follia intended to sell her mansion at Visegrád to her brother-in-law John II Drugeth and other relatives; however she had already given it away as a gift to a Hungarian knight and baron Töttös Becsei, also an influential member of the queenly court. Becsei died prior to that, and the mansion continued to remain in Maria's hands despite legal uncertainty. This is the last mention of Maria Follia in contemporary documents.

== Sources ==
- Hardi, Đura (2012). Drugeti. Povest o usponu i padu porodice pratilaca Anžujskih kraljeva [Drugeths. The History of the Rise and Decline of the Escorts of Angevin Kings] (in Serbo-Croatian (Latin script)). Faculty of Philosophy, University of Novi Sad. ISBN 978-86-6065-108-4.
- Hardi, Đura (2018). "Maria Follia, a Court Lady of the Hungarian Queen Elizabeth Łokietek, Accompanying Her Mistress on a Journey to Italy". Istraživanja: Journal of Historical Researches (29): 48–62. doi:10.19090/i.2018.29.48-62. ISSN 2406-1131.
- Zsoldos, Attila (2017). A Druget-tartomány története 1315–1342 [The History of the Druget Province 1315–1342] (in Hungarian). MTA Bölcsészettudományi Kutatóközpont Történettudományi Intézete. ISBN 978-963-4160-63-2.
