= County House, Prešov =

Representative building in Prešov, Slovakia

County House
- Župný dom
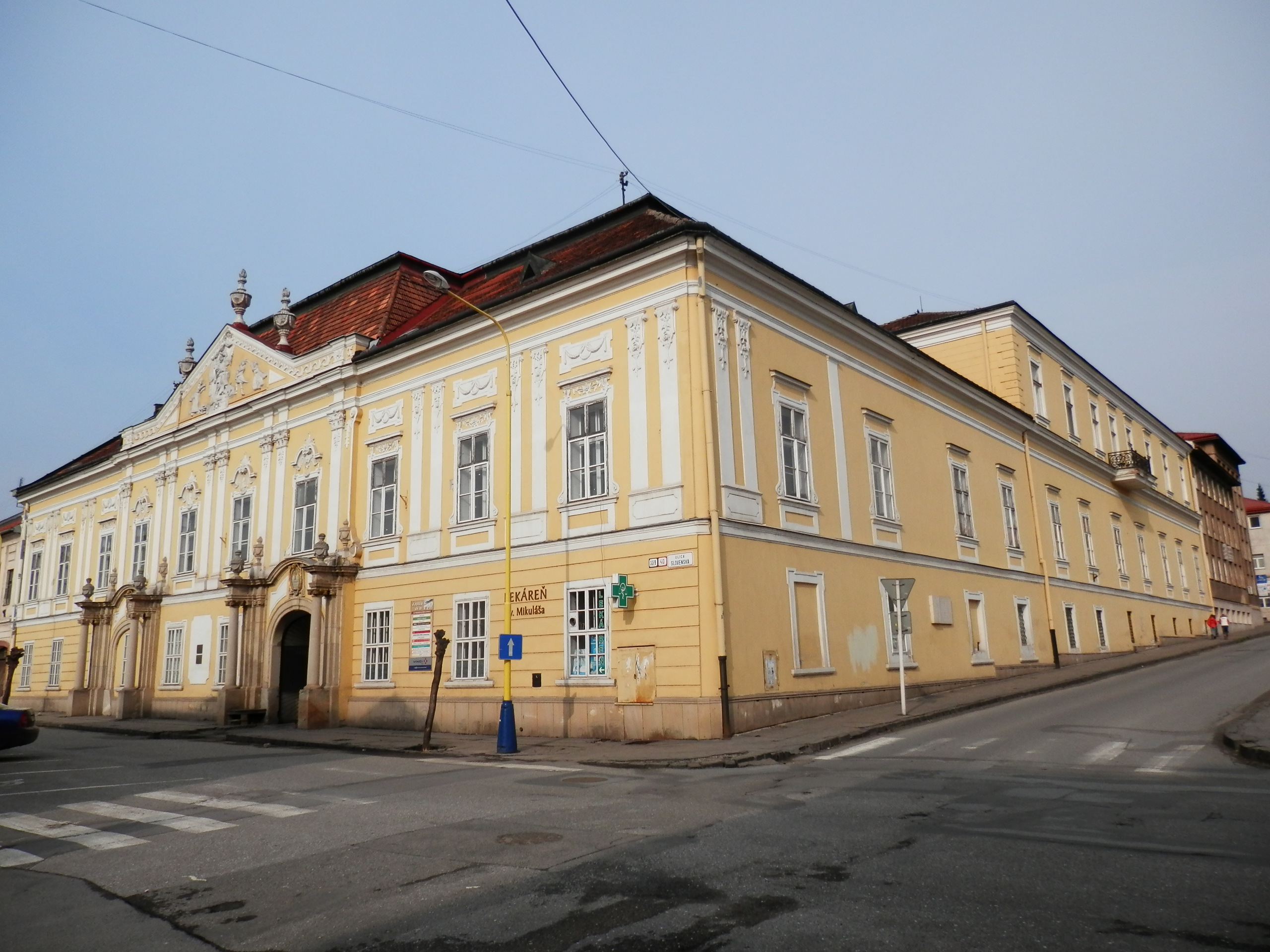
- Interactive map of the County House area

General information
- Architectural style: rococo
- Location: Prešov, Slovakia
- Coordinates: 48°59′54″N 21°14′32″E
- Year built: 1769-1770

The County House (Slovak: Župný dom) is a representative building in Prešov, Slovakia. Historically it was built to house institutions of the Sáros County. The building was constructed following the decree of Maria Theresa that requested all counties to construct new administrative buildings in the cities of their formal seats.

== History ==
The original seat of the Sáros County was in the Šariš Castle with the first the oldest known prefect being Peter who was mentioned in 1217. The seat of the county at the time was not formally established and permanent but rather moved depending on the person holding certain responsible function. In the 16th and 17th centuries the practice developed according to which most of the meetings were held in Prešov while the formal seat of the throne administration for the region moved to the city in the first half of the 17th century. At the time most of the prefect were prominent ethnic Hungarians with the first Czechoslovak county governor of the county taking office only after the 1918 establishment of the First Czechoslovak Republic when from 1920 Pavel Fábry served as the government commissioner for eastern Slovakia. The county house served its original purpose for more than a century and a half, until the end of the 1944. During the First Slovak Republic, Nazi Germany client state during the World War II, the palace served as the seat of the Šariš-Zemplín County.

== See also ==
- Sáros County
