= Nicholas Zsámboki =

Palatine of the Kingdom of Hungary in the 14th-century

Palatine of Hungary
- Reign: 1342–1356
- Predecessor: William Drugeth
- Successor: Nicholas Kont
- Noble family: Zsámboki
- Issue: Klara Zsámboki
- Father: Gilét Zsámboki

Nicholas Zsámboki was a palatine of the Kingdom of Hungary in the 14th century. He was appointed in 1342. He left his position in 1356 to hand it over to Nicholas Kont, who married his daughter Klara.
