= Drugeth Province =

Hungarian polity

Drugeth Province Druget-tartomány
- Province of the Kingdom of Hungary
- 1315–1342
- Capital: Szepes Castle; Sáros Castle; Vizsoly (court of justice)
- Government
- Lord
  - 1315–1327: Philip Drugeth
  - 1327–1342: William Drugeth
- History
  - Established: 1315
  - Disestablished: 1342
Preceded by	Succeeded by
Aba Province	Kingdom of Hungary (1301–1526)
- Today part of: Slovakia, Hungary, Ukraine

Drugeth Province (Hungarian: Druget-tartomány) is a modern historiographical term of a semi-official autonomous administrative division in the northeastern part of the Kingdom of Hungary (today in Slovakia, Hungary and Ukraine).

The formation of the province began in 1315, during the unification war of King Charles I of Hungary against the rebellious oligarchs. His protege Philip Drugeth gained large-scale domains and held the governance of various counties and castles in the region, also granting palatinal rights, which ensured judicial and administrative privileges for him. The existence of the province was based on the honor (or "office fief") system, introduced by Charles I. After Philip's death in 1327, the province was inherited by his nephew William Drugeth. At the peak of his power, William ruled over nine counties and twenty-three castles in Northeast Hungary, and the Drugeth Province was comparable with the three traditional provinces, the Voivodeship of Transylvania, the Banate of Slavonia and the Banate of Macsó in its size, the number of counties and forts and its institutions. Both Charles I and William Drugeth died in 1342. The new monarch Louis I – under the influence of their opponents – decided to abolish the Drugeth Province, confiscating the overwhelming majority of the wealth of the Drugeth family and also depriving them from political power.

== Leadership ==
=== Central administration ===
Lords of the province

Name	Period	Titles	Source
Philip Drugeth	1315–1327	Royal judge (1315–1323); Palatine (1323–1327)	
William Drugeth	1327–1342	Royal judge (1327–1333); Deputy Palatine (1333–1334); Palatine (1334–1342)	

Judges of the Court of Vizsoly

Name	Period	Titles	Source
Nicholas Perényi (1st)	1318–1323	"iudex curie"	
John	1323	"iudex curie"	
Nicholas Perényi (2nd)	1323–1334	"viceiudex"	
The Court of Vizsoly did not function (1334–1339)
Izsép Ruszkai	1339–1341	"viceiudex"	
The Court of Vizsoly ceased to exist (1341–1342)

Treasurers of the province

Name	Period	Notes	Source
Stephen "the Page"	1325–1326	from the gens (clan) Zoárd; Latin: Stephanus dictus Oproud [...], Hungarian: "Apród" István	
Gery "the Italian"	1330	Latin: Gery Gallicus, Hungarian: "Olasz" Gery	

== Sources ==
- Engel, Pál (1988). "Az ország újraegyesítése. I. Károly küzdelmei az oligarchák ellen (1310–1323) [Reunification of the Realm. The Struggles of Charles I Against the Oligarchs (1310–1323)]". Századok (in Hungarian). 122 (1–2). Magyar Történelmi Társulat: 89–146. ISSN 0039-8098.
- Engel, Pál (1996). Magyarország világi archontológiája, 1301–1457, I. [Secular Archontology of Hungary, 1301–1457, Volume I] (in Hungarian). História, MTA Történettudományi Intézete. ISBN 963-8312-44-0.
- Engel, Pál (1998). A nemesi társadalom a középkori Ung megyében [The Noble Society in Medieval Ung County] (in Hungarian). Társadalom- és művelődéstörténeti tanulmányok 25., MTA Történettudományi Intézete. ISBN 963-8312-59-9.
- Hardi, Đura (2012). Drugeti. Povest o usponu i padu porodice pratilaca Anžujskih kraljeva [Drugeths. The History of the Rise and Decline of the Escorts of Angevin Kings] (in Serbo-Croatian (Latin script)). Faculty of Philosophy, University of Novi Sad. ISBN 978-86-6065-108-4.
- Zsoldos, Attila (2017). A Druget-tartomány története 1315–1342 [The History of the Druget Province 1315–1342] (in Hungarian). MTA Bölcsészettudományi Kutatóközpont Történettudományi Intézete. ISBN 978-963-4160-63-2.
