= Košická Polianka =

Košická Polianka Lengyelfalva
- Municipality
- Flag

- Location of Košická Polianka in the Košice Region Location of Košická Polianka in Slovakia
- Coordinates: 48.69°N 21.35°E
- Country: Slovakia
- Region: Košice Region
- District: Košice-okolie District
- First mentioned: 1335

Area
  - Total: 8.21 km^{2} (3.17 sq mi)
- Elevation: 194 m (636 ft)

Population (2025)
  - Total: 1,062
- Time zone: UTC+1 (CET)
  - Summer (DST): UTC+2 (CEST)
- Postal code: 444 1
- Area code: +421 55
- Vehicle registration plate (until 2022): KS
- Website: www.kosickapolianka.sk

Košická Polianka (Slovak pronunciation: [ˈkɔʂitskaː ˈpɔlɪɐŋka]; Hungarian: Lengyelfalva [ˈlɛɲɟɛlfɒlvɒ]) is a village and large municipality in Košice-okolie District in the Kosice Region of eastern Slovakia.

== History ==
In historical records the village was first mentioned in 1335 by its Hungarian name Lengenfolua when it belonged to Drugeth and Cudar families which possessed Trstené pri Hornáde. In 1337, the village passed to Krásna nad Hornádom’s abbey. It was recorded in 1337 as Lengen, in 1427 as Lengenfalva, in 1519 as Lengelfalva, in 1630 as Lengyelfalva. The village later became a Kassa (now:Košice) town estate and successively it belonged to the Palasthy family. According to legends, the village seems to have been established by Polish settlers.

== Geography ==
The municipality lies at an altitude of 194 metres (636 ft) and covers an area of 8.21 km^{2} (3.17 sq mi) (2025).

== Population ==
Population statistic (10 years)
Year	1995	2005	2015	2025
Count	887	926	1018	1062
Difference		+4.39%	+9.93%	+4.32%

Population statistic
Year	2024	2025
Count	1066	1062
Difference		−0.37%

It has a population of 1062 people (31 December 2025).

=== Ethnicity ===
Census 2021 (1+ %)
Ethnicity	Number	Fraction
Slovak	966	93.78%
Not found out	53	5.14%
Romani	23	2.23%
Total	1030	

In year 2021 was 1030 people by ethnicity 966 as Slovak, 53 as Not found out, 23 as Romani, 6 as Hungarian, 4 as Czech, 4 as Other, 3 as German, 3 as English, 2 as Rusyn and 1 as Serbian.

Note on population: The difference values of population numbers in the table "Population statistic" and in the sections "Ethnicity" & "Religion" is caused by the use of various statistical methods.

=== Religion ===
Census 2021 (1+ %)
Religion	Number	Fraction
Roman Catholic Church	736	71.46%
None	131	12.72%
Not found out	56	5.44%
Evangelical Church	37	3.59%
Greek Catholic Church	32	3.11%
Total	1030	

In year 2021 was 1030 people by religion 736 from Roman Catholic Church, 131 from None, 56 from Not found out, 37 from Evangelical Church, 32 from Greek Catholic Church, 8 from Calvinist Church, 7 from Other and not ascertained christian church, 6 from Other, 5 from Jehovah's Witnesses, 5 from Seventh-day Adventist Church, 2 from Eastern Orthodox Church, 2 from Christian Congregations in Slovakia, 1 from Paganism and natural spirituality, 1 from Buddhism and 1 from Ad hoc movements.
