= Záhradné =

- Municipality
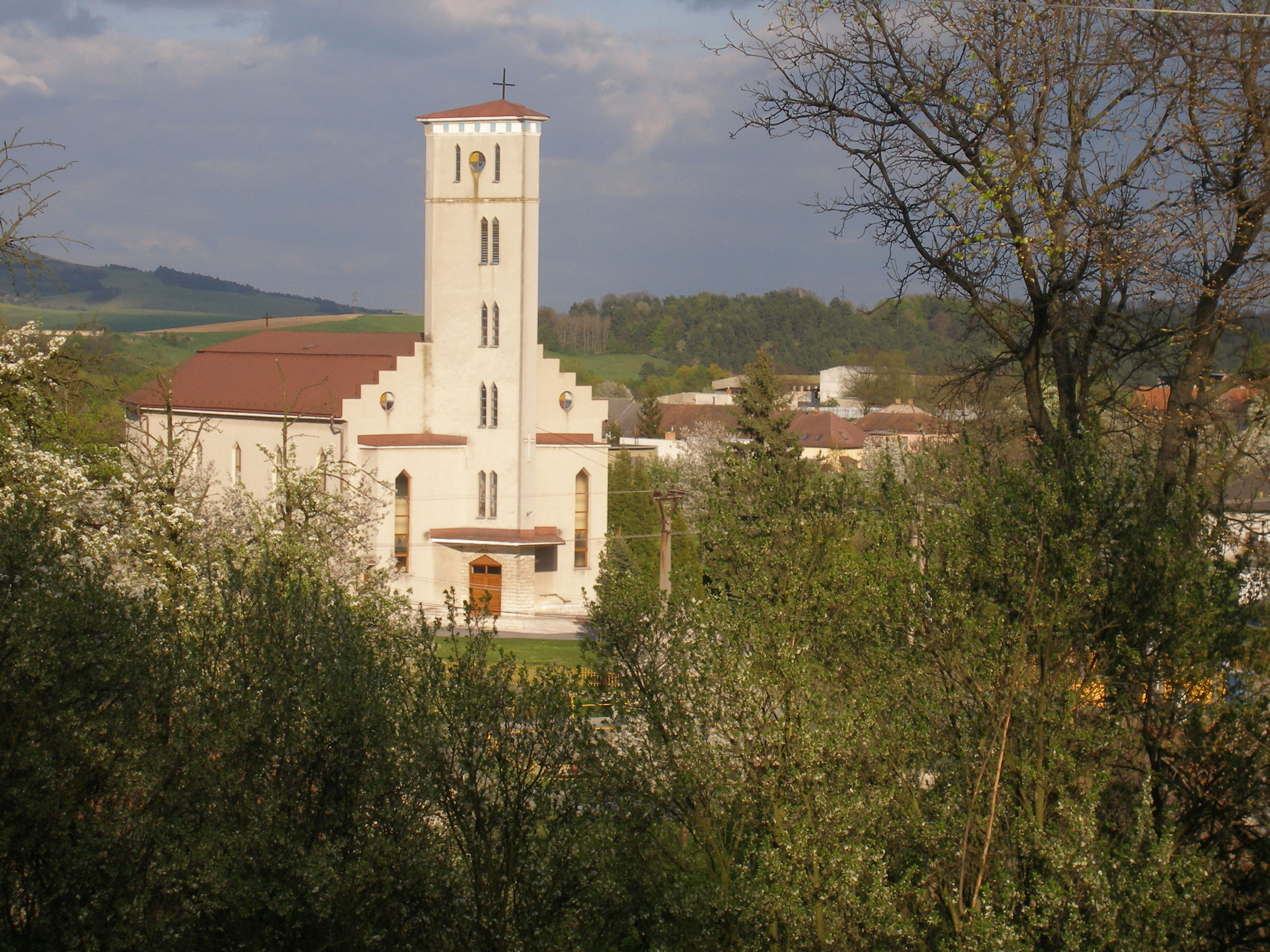

- Flag

- Location of Záhradné in the Prešov Region Location of Záhradné in Slovakia
- Coordinates: 49.08°N 21.27°E
- Country: Slovakia
- Region: Prešov Region
- District: Prešov District
- First mentioned: 1285

Area
  - Total: 8.83 km^{2} (3.41 sq mi)
- Elevation: 313 m (1,027 ft)

Population (2025)
  - Total: 1,177
- Time zone: UTC+1 (CET)
  - Summer (DST): UTC+2 (CEST)
- Postal code: 821 6
- Area code: +421 51
- Vehicle registration plate (until 2022): PO
- Website: www.obeczahradne.sk

Záhradné (Hungarian: Szedikert) is a village and municipality in Prešov District in the Prešov Region of eastern Slovakia.

== History ==
In historical records the village was first mentioned in 1285.

== Geography ==
The municipality lies at an altitude of 313 metres (1,027 ft) and covers an area of 8.83 km^{2} (3.41 sq mi) (2025).

== Population ==
Population statistic (10 years)
Year	1995	2005	2015	2025
Count	933	929	987	1177
Difference		−0.42%	+6.24%	+19.25%

Population statistic
Year	2024	2025
Count	1157	1177
Difference		+1.72%

It has a population of 1177 people (31 December 2025).

=== Ethnicity ===
Census 2021 (1+ %)
Ethnicity	Number	Fraction
Slovak	1084	98.45%
Not found out	15	1.36%
Total	1101	

In year 2021 was 1101 people by ethnicity 1084 as Slovak, 15 as Not found out, 11 as Czech, 7 as Rusyn, 1 as Ukrainian, 1 as Serbian, 1 as Hungarian and 1 as Other.

Note on population: The difference values of population numbers in the table "Population statistic" and in the sections "Ethnicity" & "Religion" is caused by the use of various statistical methods.

=== Religion ===
Census 2021 (1+ %)
Religion	Number	Fraction
Roman Catholic Church	938	85.2%
None	76	6.9%
Greek Catholic Church	38	3.45%
Evangelical Church	28	2.54%
Not found out	15	1.36%
Total	1101	

In year 2021 was 1101 people by religion 938 from Roman Catholic Church, 76 from None, 38 from Greek Catholic Church, 28 from Evangelical Church, 15 from Not found out, 3 from Eastern Orthodox Church, 1 from Jehovah's Witnesses, 1 from Christian Congregations in Slovakia and 1 from Buddhism.
