= Olšovany =

Olšovany Ósva
- Municipality
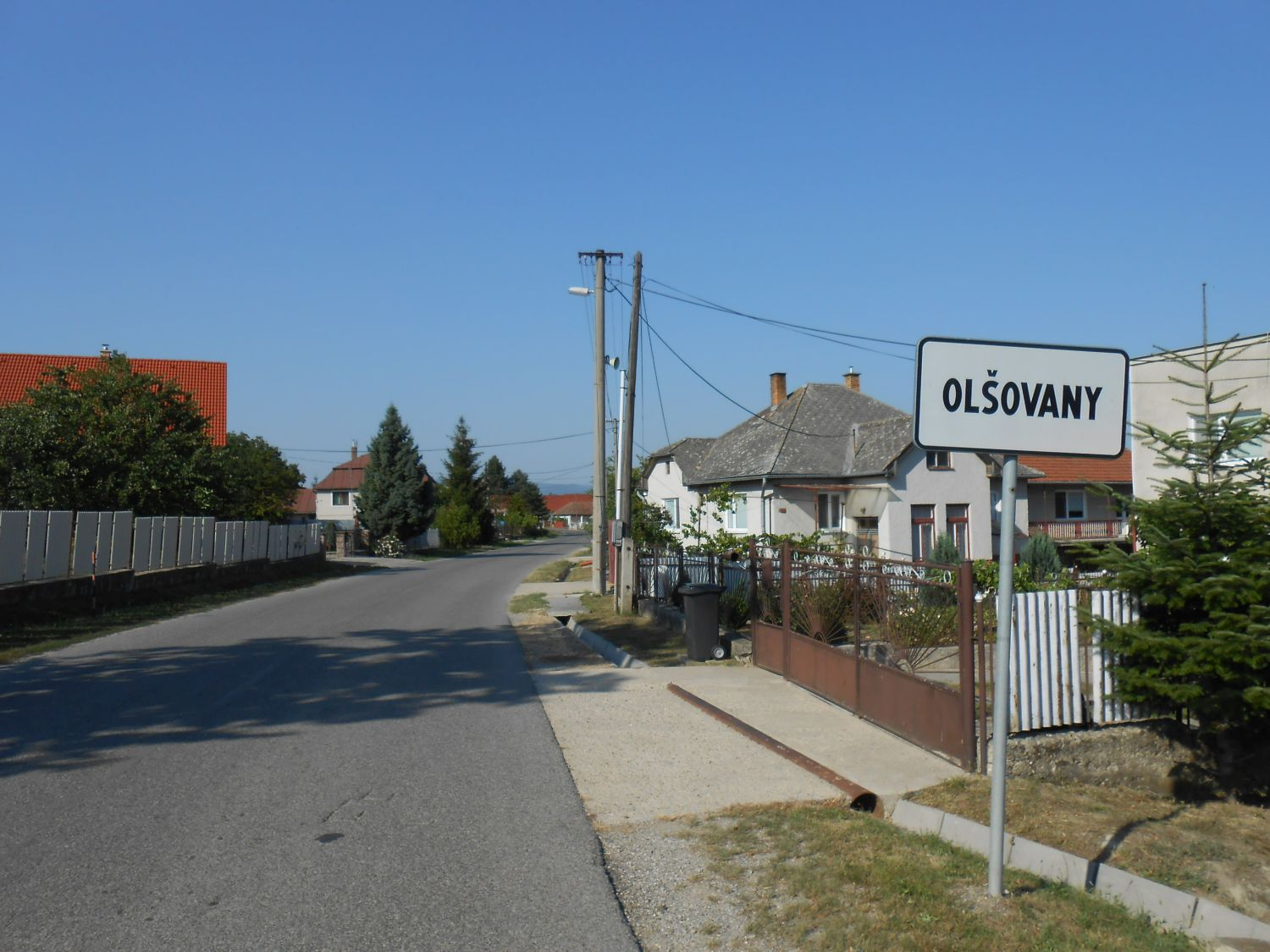

- Flag

- Location of Olšovany in the Košice Region Location of Olšovany in Slovakia
- Coordinates: 48.70°N 21.42°E
- Country: Slovakia
- Region: Košice Region
- District: Košice-okolie District
- First mentioned: 1272

Area
  - Total: 9.97 km^{2} (3.85 sq mi)
- Elevation: 224 m (735 ft)

Population (2025)
  - Total: 686
- Time zone: UTC+1 (CET)
  - Summer (DST): UTC+2 (CEST)
- Postal code: 441 9
- Area code: +421 55
- Vehicle registration plate (until 2022): KS
- Website: www.obecolsovany.sk

Olšovany (Hungarian: Ósva) is a village and municipality in Košice-okolie District in the Kosice Region of eastern Slovakia.

== History ==
In historical records the village was first mentioned in 1272.

== Geography ==
The municipality lies at an altitude of 224 metres (735 ft) and covers an area of 9.97 km^{2} (3.85 sq mi) (2025).

== Population ==
Population statistic (10 years)
Year	1995	2005	2015	2025
Count	412	550	626	686
Difference		+33.49%	+13.81%	+9.58%

Population statistic
Year	2024	2025
Count	680	686
Difference		+0.88%

It has a population of 686 people (31 December 2025).

=== Ethnicity ===
Census 2021 (1+ %)
Ethnicity	Number	Fraction
Slovak	672	99.4%
Romani	126	18.63%
Not found out	8	1.18%
Total	676	

In year 2021 was 676 people by ethnicity 672 as Slovak, 126 as Romani, 8 as Not found out, 3 as Czech, 3 as Ukrainian, 3 as Rusyn and 3 as Other.

Note on population: The difference values of population numbers in the table "Population statistic" and in the sections "Ethnicity" & "Religion" is caused by the use of various statistical methods.

=== Religion ===
Census 2021 (1+ %)
Religion	Number	Fraction
Roman Catholic Church	425	62.87%
None	158	23.37%
Calvinist Church	44	6.51%
Greek Catholic Church	22	3.25%
Evangelical Church	17	2.51%
Total	676	

In year 2021 was 676 people by religion 425 from Roman Catholic Church, 158 from None, 44 from Calvinist Church, 22 from Greek Catholic Church, 17 from Evangelical Church, 2 from Eastern Orthodox Church, 2 from Jehovah's Witnesses, 1 from Old Catholic Church, 1 from Not found out, 1 from Other, 1 from United Methodist Church, 1 from Buddhism and 1 from Ad hoc movements.

== Culture ==
The village has a public library and a number of stores including food facilities.
