= Drugeth family =

French-Hungarian noble family

House of Drugeth
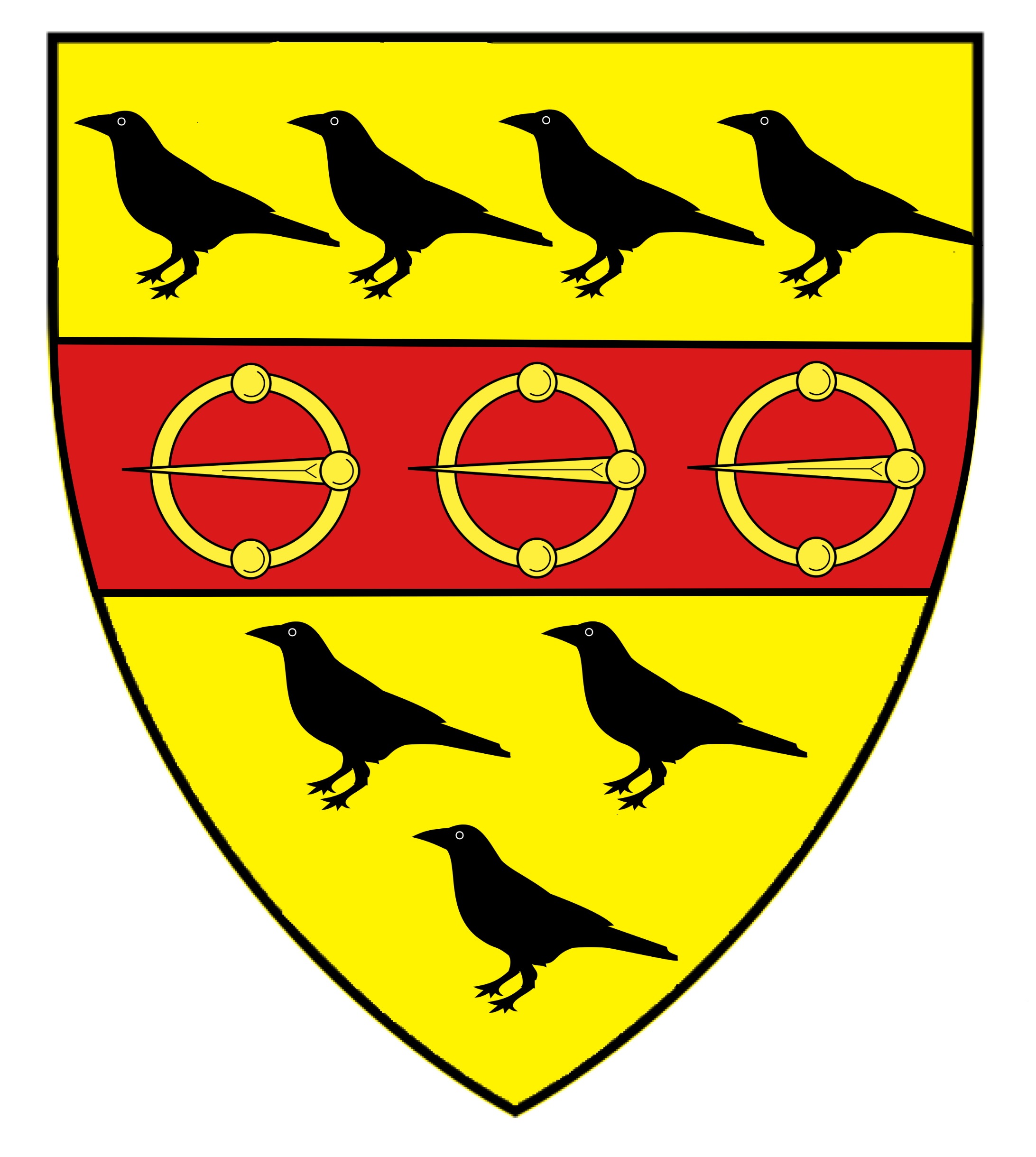
- Country: Kingdom of France; Kingdom of Naples; Kingdom of Hungary
- Founded: 1315 (in Hungary)
- Founder: Fülöp (Philip), Palatine of Hungary
- Final ruler: Zsigmond II (executed)
- Titles: Count Drugeth de Homonna
- Dissolution: 1684/1691

The House of Drugeth was a powerful noble family (of French origin) of the Kingdom of Hungary in the 14th to 17th centuries whose possessions were located in the northeastern parts of the kingdom. The ancestors of the family left Apulia (Southern Italy) for Hungary during the reign of King Charles I. Several members of the family held high offices in the first half of the 14th century and later, when the Drugeth estates were the largest in all of Hungary. The family continued to be important until the male line died out in 1691.

== Origin ==
The Drugeths (or Drugets) originated from the Kingdom of France. They belonged to the escort of Charles I of Anjou, who conquered the Kingdom of Sicily in 1266. In contemporary Italian records, they were referred to as "de Druget", "Rugeth", "Truget", "Drugetus" and "de Druetto", among others. 19th-century Hungarian historian József Hampel considered the Drugeths adopted their surname after a forename (Drugo, Druetto), and he assumed a relationship with the Merloto family of French origin due to the similarity of heraldic animals in their coats-of-arms. Based on the narration of the 16th-century poet Johannes Bocatius, who mentioned the Drugeths' "Salernitan roots", several historians, such as István Katona, Károly Wagner and genealogist Mór Wertner refused the theory of their French origin, but archivist István Miskolczy, who conducted research in the State Archives of Naples, convincingly proved the early origin of the family in the 1930s. Serbian historian Đura Hardi also argued the Drugeths belonged to those Neapolitan elite of Ultramontane (French or Provençal) origin, who arrived to Southern Italy with Charles of Anjou, because of their courtly positions which were exclusively held by non-Italian nobles during that time.

The first known member of the family was Nicholas (Niccolò), who was among the courtiers of Charles I in 1267. He was styled as royal doorkeeper in 1267 and 1270. He escorted the king to Rome around that time. His wife was Isabella, a scion of the de La Forêt family of French origin (her mother was Johanna, a lady-in-waiting in the court of Queen Beatrice of Provence). Nicholas and Isabella were granted fiefdoms in Melito di Napoli and Pascarola near the Angevins' hunting estate, Aversa on 5 October 1271. Nicholas served as castellan of the St. Erasmus Tower in Capua from 1272 to 1279 and of Nocera Inferiore from 1274 to 1276. In the latter place, Nicholas and Isabella were appointed guardians and tutors of the children of Charles, Prince of Salerno, the heir to the Neapolitan throne, and Mary of Hungary. It is plausible that Nicholas and Isabella had no children. Nicholas was entitled as "nobilis", "dominus" and "miles" in contemporary documents, reflecting his social status in the royal court. During the captivity of Charles II in 1285, Robert of Artois acted as regent, who donated an estate in Suessa to Nicholas. After Charles was freed from captivity and ascended the Neapolitan throne, he withdrew the donation, among others.

A certain Guiot (Guy, Guido or Gicottus) was also a member of the Drugeth family, who was mentioned by sources between 1272 and 1277. He was a minor member of the royal court. His name appears in Les Archives Angevines De Naples by French historian Paul Durrieu. According to József Hampel, he was a brother of Nicholas, but there is no record of that.

John ("Johannes de Trogect") was the younger brother of Nicholas, although Miskolczy identified him as his son, who died at a young age. John and his wife, Isabella from an unidentified family were first mentioned by a record in 1284, when they were granted four warehouses as a fiefdom in Naples. John was referred to as a royal valet. Both John and Isabella died by the middle of the 1290s. They had two sons, John and Philip and a daughter Matilda, who were all still minors at the turn of the 13th and 14th centuries, because their names appeared in diminutive forms in a single document around 1300 ("Joannoctus, Filippoctus et Matchtilda Drugetii"). Their uncle and aunt, Nicholas and Isabella adopted and took over the care of the children, who became their immediate heirs too. Nicholas served as Lord Steward for Charles Martel's wife Clemence from 1292 to 1295. Both died of the plague in Naples. In 1298, Nicholas was mentioned as tutor of the children of the late Charles Martel – i.e. Charles (the future King of Hungary), Clementia and Beatrice. Consequently, Nicholas' nephews John and Philip were raised together with Charles in the royal court, where they cherished their lifelong friendship and alliance. While John entered the service of Clementia (later Queen consort of France for a short time), the younger brother Philip belonged to the escort of Charles, who would have been the lawful heir to his grandfather Charles II. However the king excluded the child Charles from succeeding the throne in the Kingdom of Naples. Instead of this, Charles was sent to Hungary in order to claim the throne in 1300, and the child Philip (who was of a similar age as the prince, who was born in 1288) escorted him to the kingdom. Nicholas died prior to 1299. His widow Isabella died around 1300. Matilda was mentioned by her last will and testament. Her guardian was Theobald de Fontenay, who raised her in the monastery of the fugitive Cistercian nuns of Constantinople in Naples.

Family tree

- N
  - Nicholas (fl. 1267–95, d. before 1299) ∞ Isabella de La Forêt (fl. 1271–92, d. around 1300)
  - (?) John (fl. 1284–92) ∞ Isabella N (fl. 1284)
    - John (fl. 1299–1334†) ∞ Pasqua de Bononensi (fl. 1316–32†) → Hungarian branch
    - Philip (fl. 1300–27†) ∞ Margaret N (fl. 1340, d. before 1351)
      - Clara (fl. 1351, d. before 1354) ∞ Ákos Mikcsfi (fl. 1330–72, d. before 1376)
      - Margaret (fl. 1347–54) ∞ Nicholas II Felsőlendvai (fl. 1325–46†), then Ákos Mikcsfi
    - Matilda (fl. around 1300)
- N (?)
  - Guiot (fl. 1272–77)

== Notable members of the family ==
The first member of the family establishing himself in the Kingdom of Hungary was Philip Drugeth (Hungarian: Druget Fülöp) (c. 1288–1327) who accompanied the future King Charles I from the Kingdom of Naples to Hungary in 1300. He took part in the king's military campaigns against his opponents and the rebelling aristocrats. He led the king's armies, in 1317, against the rebellious Peter, son of Petenye (who possessed several castles in Zemplén county) and in 1320, against Matthew III Csák. He was the head (ispán) of the Counties Szepes (1315–1327), Abaúj (1317–1327), Gömör and Torna (1320–1327), establishing a large contiguous province in Northeast Hungary. Philipp was the Master of the Queen's Treasury (királynéi tárnokmester) between 1321 and 1327, when King Charles appointed him to Palatine (nádor); he hold the latter office until his death. King Charles granted him the possession of the Castles Barkó (Slovak: Brekov), Jeszenő (Slovak: Jasenov), Lubló (Slovak: Ľubovňa), Palocsa (Slovak: Plaveč), Szokoly (Slovak: Sokoľ) and Terebes (Slovak: Trebišov).

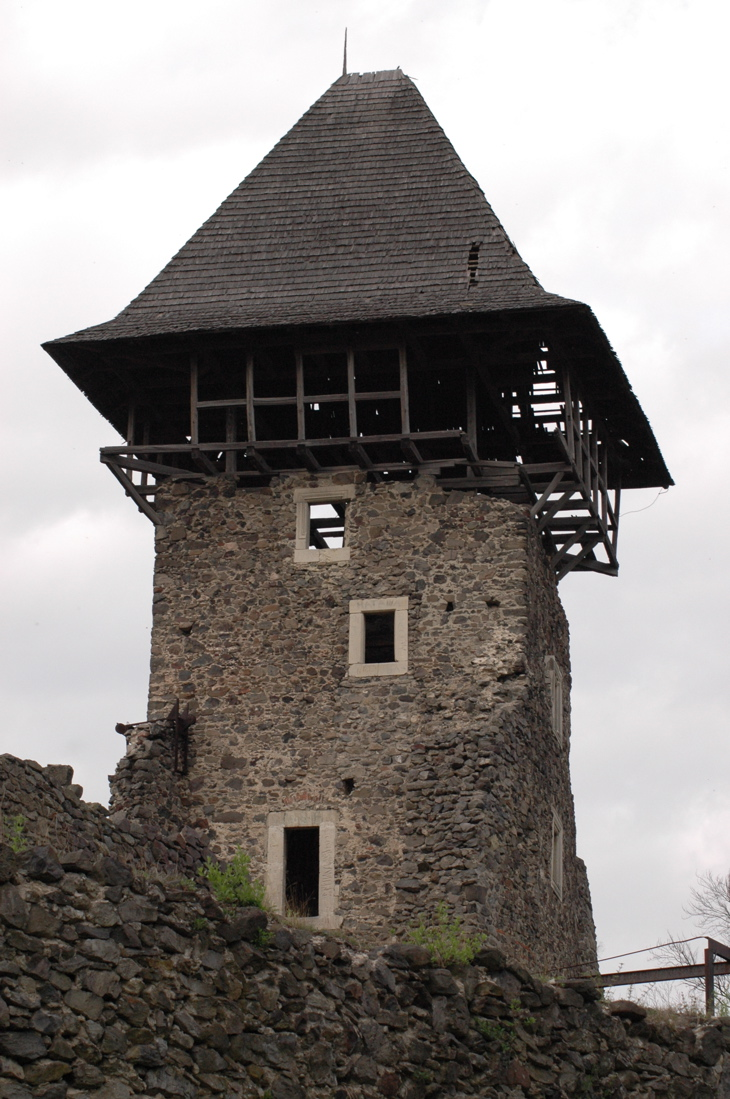
Nevickei Castle in modern-day Ukraine was the property of the Drugeth family.

Philip's older brother, John Drugeth (Hungarian: Druget János) (?–1334) arrived from the Kingdom of Naples to Hungary before Philip's death. King Charles I appointed him to Palatine in 1328. He was also the head of the Counties Bács (1330–1333), Fejér, Somogy, Tolna, Ung and Zemplén (1328–1333) and castellan of Óbuda (1328). The king granted him the Nevicke Castle in 1332. In 1333, he returned to Naples.

Palatine John's elder son, William Drugeth (Hungarian: Druget Vilmos) (?–1342) was the most powerful member of the family. He followed his uncle, Philip in his offices in 1327, and became the head of the Counties Abaúj, Gömör and Szepes, (1327–1342); and he also was the ispán of the Counties Borsod, Heves (1327–1342) and Sáros (1328–1342). He inherited his uncle's possessions on the north-eastern parts of the kingdom where he had the Dunajec Castle built before 1333. Around 1330, he acquired the Castle of Szalánc (Slovak: Slanec). When his father left for Naples in 1333, William became his deputy as Palatine, and followed him as the head of the Counties Ung and Zemplén (1333–1342). Following his father's death in 1334, William was appointed to Palatine. In 1340, he led the armies King Charles I sent to Poland in order to assist King Casimir III of Poland. In his last will, he left his possessions to his brother, Nicholas, but King Louis I of Hungary confiscated them upon the request of his mother, the Queen Dowager Elisabeth. William's wife was Italian noblewoman Maria Follia.

Palatine John's second son, Nicholas Drugeth de Gerény (Hungarian: gerényi Druget Miklós) (?–1355) was appointed to Master of the Cup-bearers (pohárnokmester) in 1332 and he became the head of Ugocsa County in 1337. When his brother, William died in 1342, King Louis I not only confiscated him of the inheritance, but also removed Nicholas from his offices. However, he regained the king's favor soon who granted Barkó and Nevicke jointly to Nicholas and his brother, John from William's legacy in 1343. In the same year, Nicholas became the head of the Ung County (1343–1354). Nicholas was appointed judge royal (országbíró) (and he became also the ispán of Turóc County) in 1354, and thus held the third office of the kingdom in his last year. The branch "Gerényi" of the Drugeth family ascended from him, but its male line died out already in the third generation.

Palatine John's third son, John Drugeth de Homonna (Hungarian: homonnai Druget János) (?–1362) founded the "Homonnai" branch of the family in what is today the town of Humenné in Slovakia. In 1343, he was granted the possession of Barkó and Nevicke jointly with his younger brother, Nicholas. John followed Nicholas as head of the Ung County (1354–1362).

== See also ==
- List of titled noble families in the Kingdom of Hungary

== Sources ==
- Csukovits, Enikő (2012). Az Anjouk Magyarországon. I. rész. I. Károly és uralkodása (1301‒1342) [The Angevins in Hungary, Vol. 1. Charles I and His Reign (1301‒1342)] (in Hungarian). MTA Bölcsészettudományi Kutatóközpont Történettudományi Intézet. ISBN 978-963-9627-53-6.
- Engel, Pál (1988). "Az ország újraegyesítése. I. Károly küzdelmei az oligarchák ellen (1310–1323) [Reunification of the Realm. The Struggles of Charles I Against the Oligarchs (1310–1323)]". Századok (in Hungarian). 122 (1–2). Magyar Történelmi Társulat: 89–146. ISSN 0039-8098.
- Engel, Pál (1996). Magyarország világi archontológiája, 1301–1457, I. [Secular Archontology of Hungary, 1301–1457, Volume I] (in Hungarian). História, MTA Történettudományi Intézete. ISBN 963-8312-44-0.
- Engel, Pál (1998). A nemesi társadalom a középkori Ung megyében [The Noble Society in Medieval Ung County] (in Hungarian). Társadalom- és művelődéstörténeti tanulmányok 25., MTA Történettudományi Intézete. ISBN 963-8312-59-9.
- Hardi, Đura (2012). Drugeti. Povest o usponu i padu porodice pratilaca Anžujskih kraljeva [Drugeths. The History of the Rise and Decline of the Escorts of Angevin Kings] (in Serbo-Croatian (Latin script)). Faculty of Philosophy, University of Novi Sad. ISBN 978-86-6065-108-4.
- Kristó, Gyula (2003). "I. Károly király harcai a tartományurak ellen (1310–1323) [The Struggles of Charles I Against the Oligarchs (1310–1323)]". Századok (in Hungarian). 137 (2). Magyar Történelmi Társulat: 297–347. ISSN 0039-8098.
- Lenčiš, Štefan (2003). Šľachtický rod Drugetovcov z Humenného [The noble Druget family of Humenné] (in Slovak). Matica slovenská. ISBN 978-8096-730-25-4.
- Markó, László (2006). A magyar állam főméltóságai Szent Istvántól napjainkig: Életrajzi Lexikon [Great Officers of State in Hungary from King Saint Stephen to Our Days: A Biographical Encyclopedia] (in Hungarian). Helikon Kiadó. ISBN 963-208-970-7.
- Miskolczy, István (1936). "A Drugetek őseiről [The Ancestors of the Drugets]". Turul (in Hungarian). 50 (1–2). Magyar Heraldikai és Genealógiai Társaság: 1–5. ISSN 1216-7258.
- Szőcs, Tibor (2014). A nádori intézmény korai története, 1000–1342 [An Early History of the Palatinal Institution: 1000–1342] (in Hungarian). Magyar Tudományos Akadémia Támogatott Kutatások Irodája. ISBN 978-963-508-697-9.
- Zsoldos, Attila (2012a). "A Drugetek és a "hét vármegye" [The Drugets and their "Seven Counties"]". In Bagi, Dániel; Fedeles, Tamás; Kiss, Gergely (eds.). "Köztes-Európa vonzásában". Ünnepi tanulmányok Font Márta tiszteletére (in Hungarian). Kronosz Kiadó. pp. 577–585. ISBN 978-615-5181-69-6.
- Zsoldos, Attila (2012b). "Nádor és helyettese: Druget János és Vilmos [The Palatine and His Deputy: János and Vilmos Druget]". Történelmi Szemle (in Hungarian). 54 (4). Hungarian Academy of Sciences: 527–541. ISSN 0040-9634.
- Zsoldos, Attila (2016). "A Druget-vagyon születése [The Birth of the Druget Wealth]". In Horn, Ildikó; Lauter, Éva; Várkonyi, Gábor; Hiller, István; Szirtes, Zsófia; Balogh, Zsuzsanna; Pásztor, Katalin; Tamás, Máté (eds.). Művészet és mesterség: Tisztelgő kötet R. Várkonyi Ágnes emlékére 1–2 (in Hungarian). L'Harmattan Kiadó. pp. 63–85. ISBN 978-963-2364-97-1.
- Zsoldos, Attila (2017). A Druget-tartomány története 1315–1342 [The History of the Druget Province 1315–1342] (in Hungarian). MTA Bölcsészettudományi Kutatóközpont Történettudományi Intézete. ISBN 978-963-4160-63-2.
