= Trsťany =

Village and municipality in Slovakia

Trsťany Füzérnádaska
- Municipality
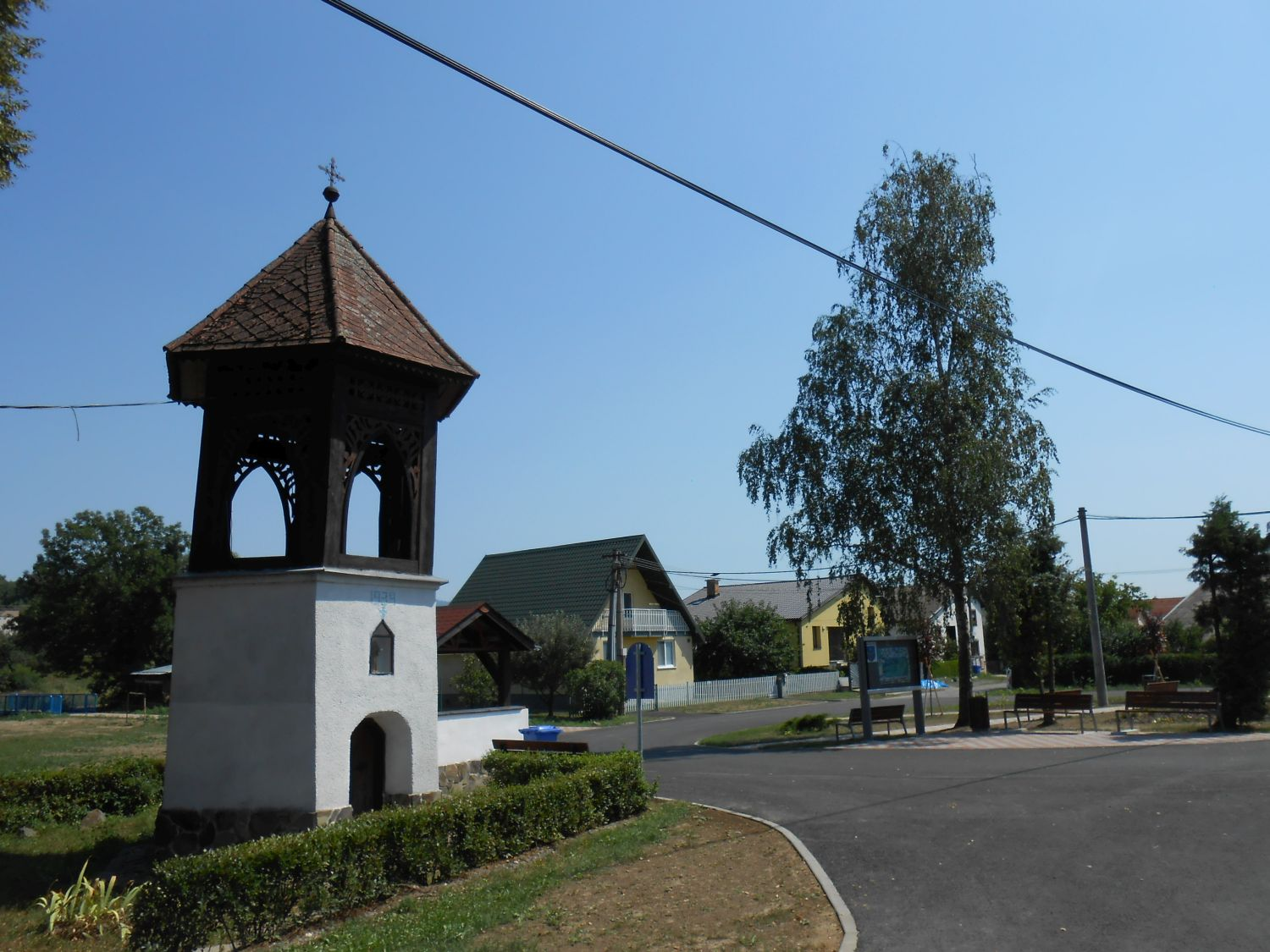

- Flag

- Location of Trsťany in the Košice Region Location of Trsťany in Slovakia
- Coordinates: 48.77°N 21.42°E
- Country: Slovakia
- Region: Košice Region
- District: Košice-okolie District
- First mentioned: 1288

Area
  - Total: 6.59 km^{2} (2.54 sq mi)
- Elevation: 249 m (817 ft)

Population (2025)
  - Total: 371
- Time zone: UTC+1 (CET)
  - Summer (DST): UTC+2 (CEST)
- Postal code: 444 5
- Area code: +421 55
- Vehicle registration plate (until 2022): KS
- Website: www.trstany.sk

Trsťany (Hungarian: Füzérnádaska) is a village and municipality in Košice-okolie District in the Kosice Region of eastern Slovakia.

== History ==
In historical records the village was first mentioned in 1288.

== Geography ==
The municipality lies at an altitude of 249 metres (817 ft) and covers an area of 6.59 km^{2} (2.54 sq mi) (2025).

== Population ==
Population statistic (10 years)
| Year | 1995 | 2005 | 2015 | 2025 |
|---|---|---|---|---|
| Count | 233 | 246 | 295 | 371 |
| Difference | | +5.57% | +19.91% | +25.76% |

Population statistic
| Year | 2024 | 2025 |
|---|---|---|
| Count | 350 | 371 |
| Difference | | +6% |

It has a population of 371 people (31 December 2025).

=== Ethnicity ===
Census 2021 (1+ %)
| Ethnicity | Number | Fraction |
|---|---|---|
| Slovak | 299 | 99% |
| Other | 4 | 1.32% |
| Total | 302 | |

In year 2021 was 302 people by ethnicity 299 as Slovak, 4 as Other, 2 as Rusyn, 2 as Not found out and 1 as Czech.

Note on population: The difference values of population numbers in the table "Population statistic" and in the sections "Ethnicity" & "Religion" is caused by the use of various statistical methods.

=== Religion ===
Census 2021 (1+ %)
| Religion | Number | Fraction |
|---|---|---|
| Roman Catholic Church | 188 | 62.25% |
| None | 53 | 17.55% |
| Evangelical Church | 36 | 11.92% |
| Greek Catholic Church | 8 | 2.65% |
| Other | 5 | 1.66% |
| Total | 302 | |

In year 2021 was 302 people by religion 188 from Roman Catholic Church, 53 from None, 36 from Evangelical Church, 8 from Greek Catholic Church, 5 from Other, 3 from Eastern Orthodox Church, 2 from Calvinist Church, 2 from Christian Congregations in Slovakia, 2 from Ad hoc movements, 1 from Not found out, 1 from Islam and 1 from Apostolic Church.
