= Šariš Castle =

- Šarišský hrad (in Slovak)
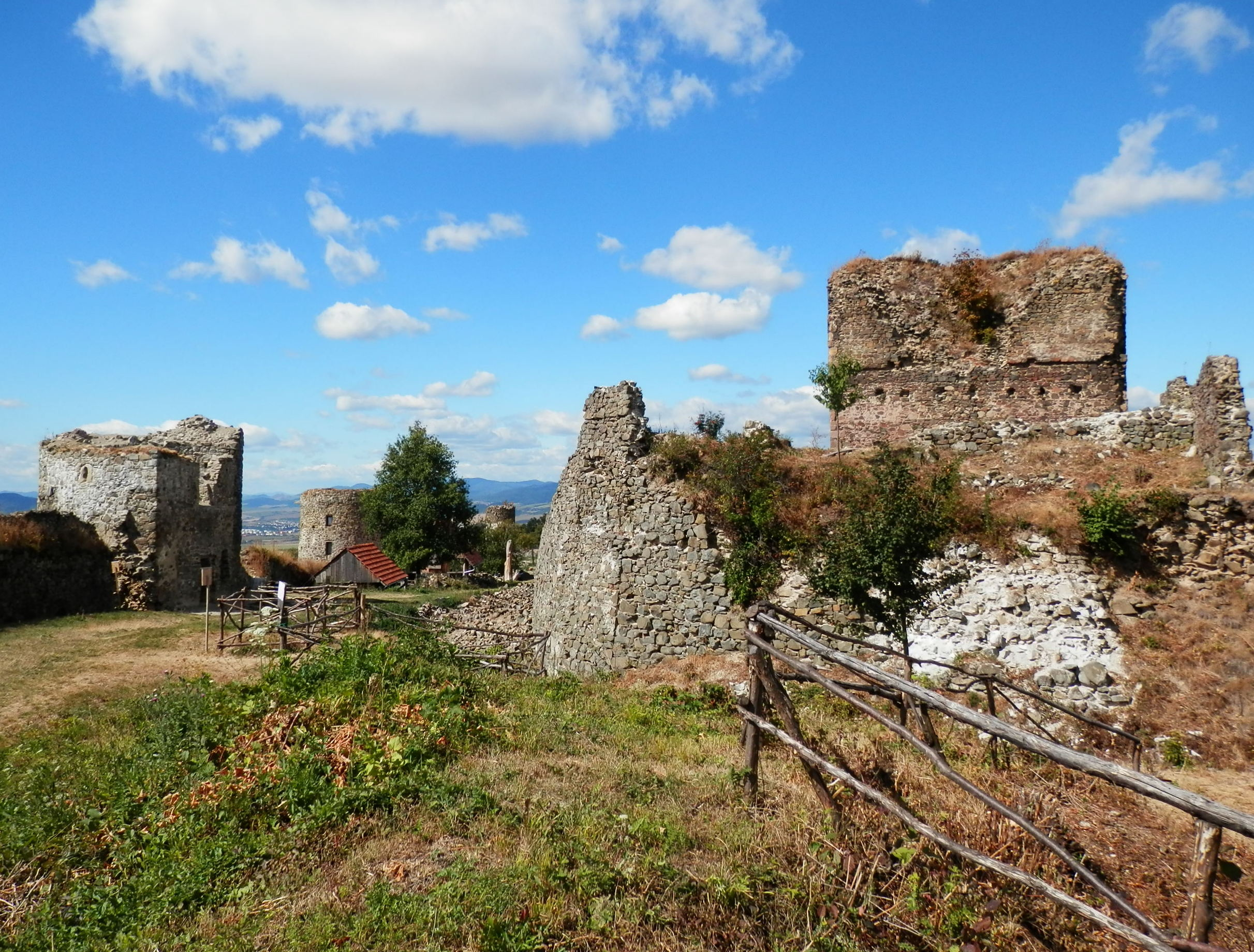
- Interactive map of the Šariš Castle area
- Alternative names: Hrad Šariš, Sáros (vára), castrum Sarus (1245), castrum de Saarus (1312), etc.

General information
- Type: Ruined castle, Hilltop castle, Royal castle
- Location: Veľký Šariš, Slovakia
- Coordinates: 49°3′09″N 21°10′34″E
- Elevation: ca 570 m (1870.07 ft) ASL
- Construction started: 13th century
- Owner: Municipality of Veľký Šariš

Šariš Castle (Slovak: Šarišský hrad, Hungarian: Sáros vára) is a ruined Gothic and Renaissance era stone castle above the town of Veľký Šariš in Prešov District, Prešov Region, Slovakia. It is a hilltop castle located on a cone-shaped hill with a wide plateau at its top, at an altitude of approximately 570 m (1870.07 ft) above sea level. The ruins lie 6-7 km northwest of Prešov, Slovakia, in the traditional region Šariš. The castle is listed in the National Cultural Heritage list of the Monuments Board of the Slovak Republic.

== History ==
The castle is one of the oldest and biggest castles in Slovakia. It was permanently settled from the Neolithic to the 4th century AD, then from the 10th to the 12th century, and finally a new castle was built in the 13th century. The castle was destroyed by fire in 1678.

The former county and traditional region of Šariš both draw their name from the name of the castle, due to it having served as the original county seat for several centuries (as was common with many Hungarian castles serving this political function).

== Gallery ==
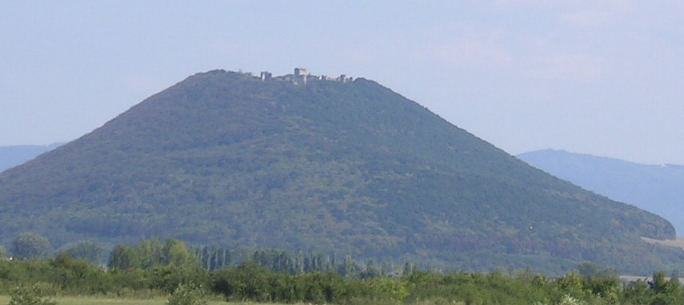
Šariš Castle Hill as seen from the northwest (ca 2004)

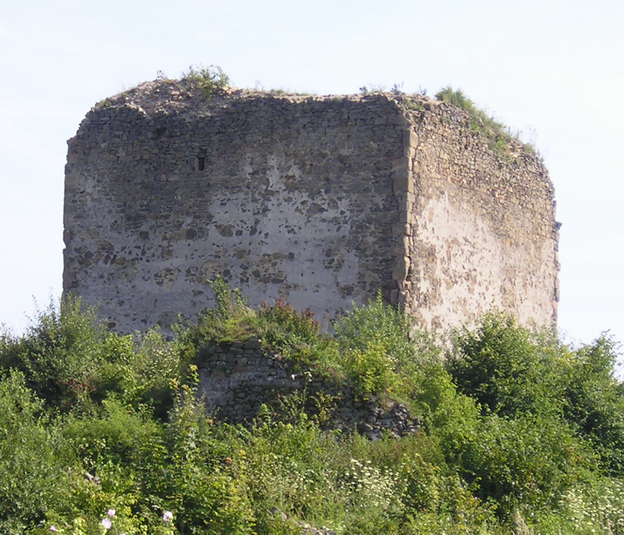
The keep before the start of restoration works (ca 2004)

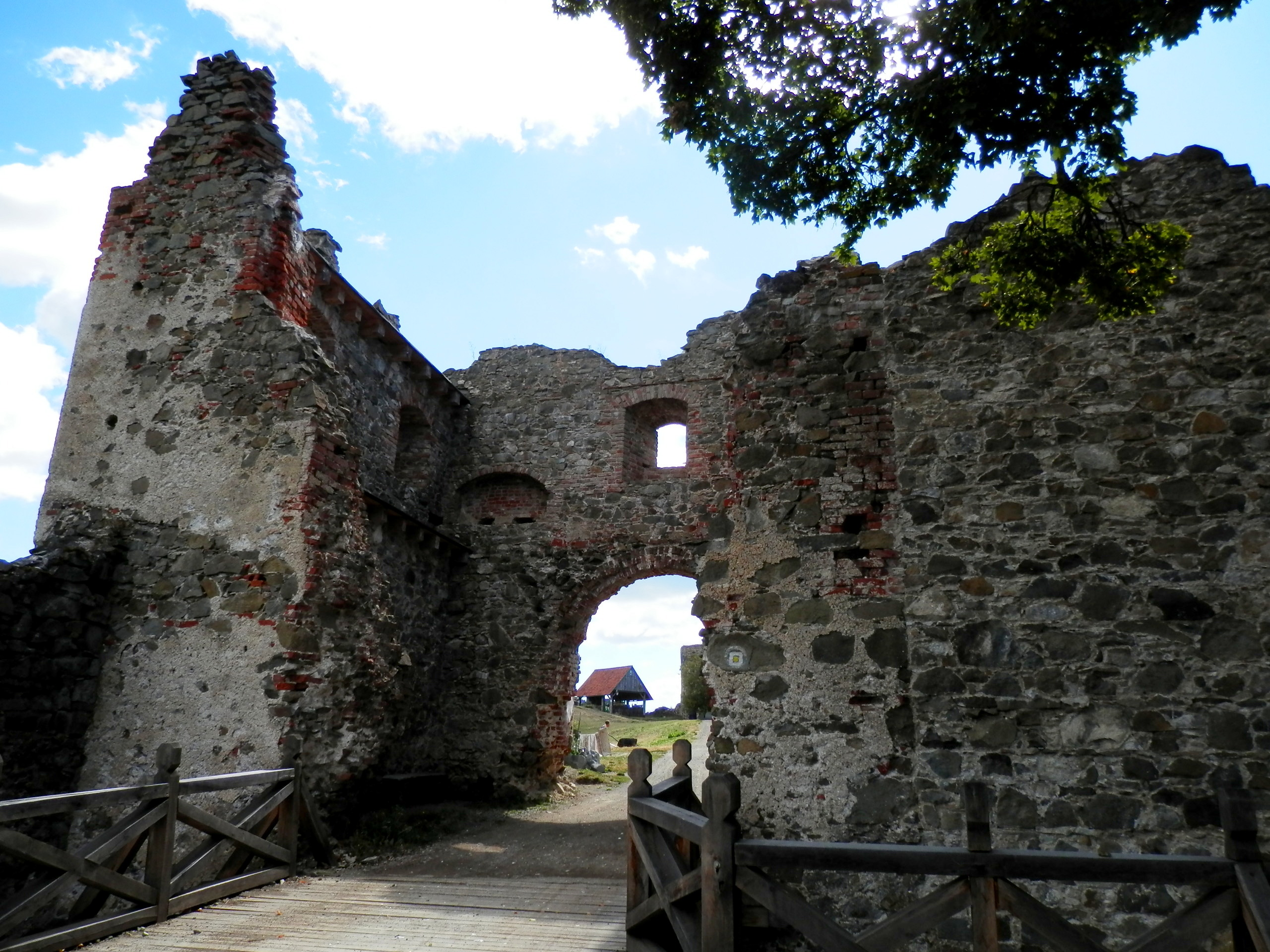
One of the preserved gatehouses (September 2013)

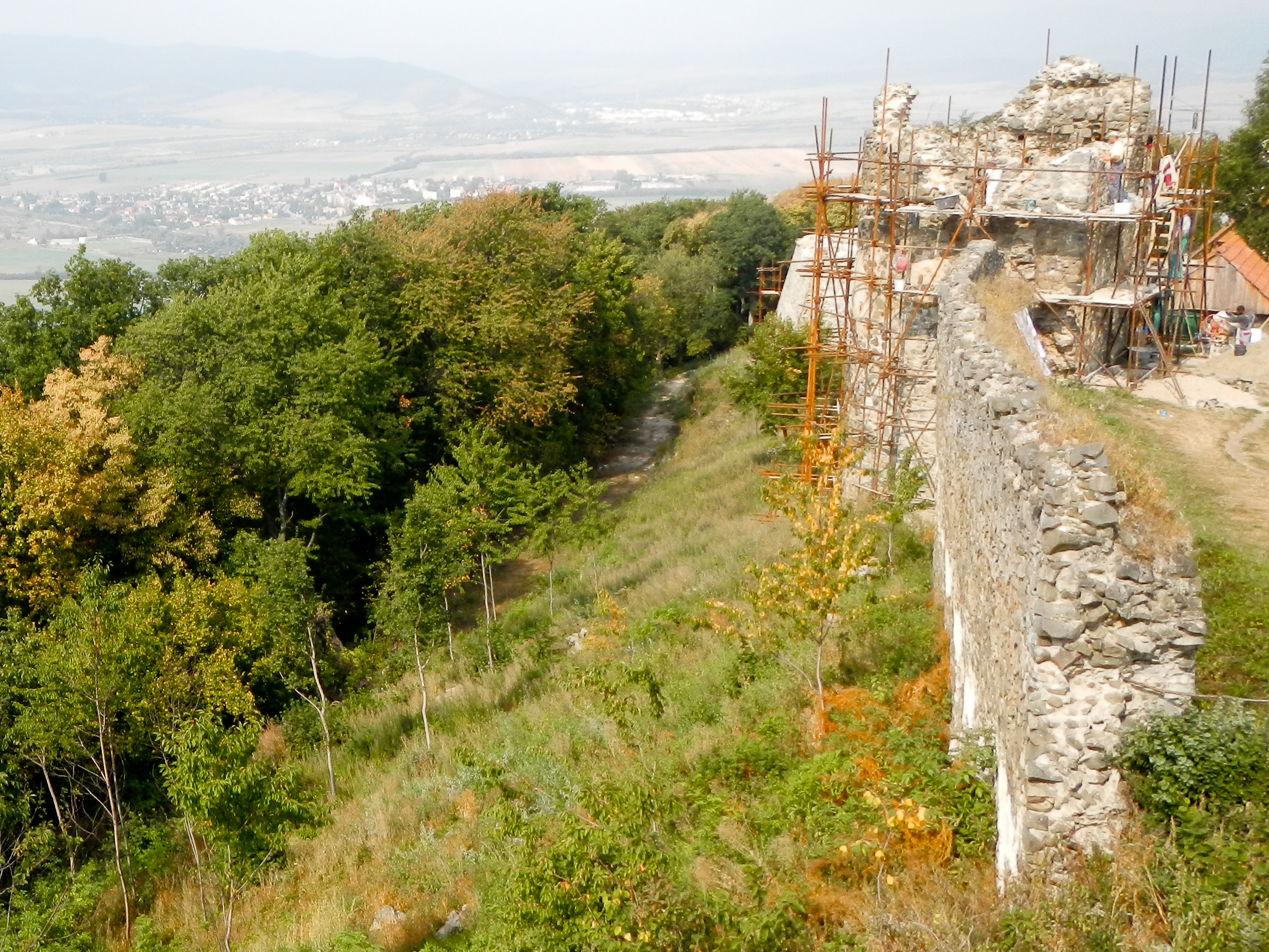
Perimeter walls and bastion under restoration (September 2012)

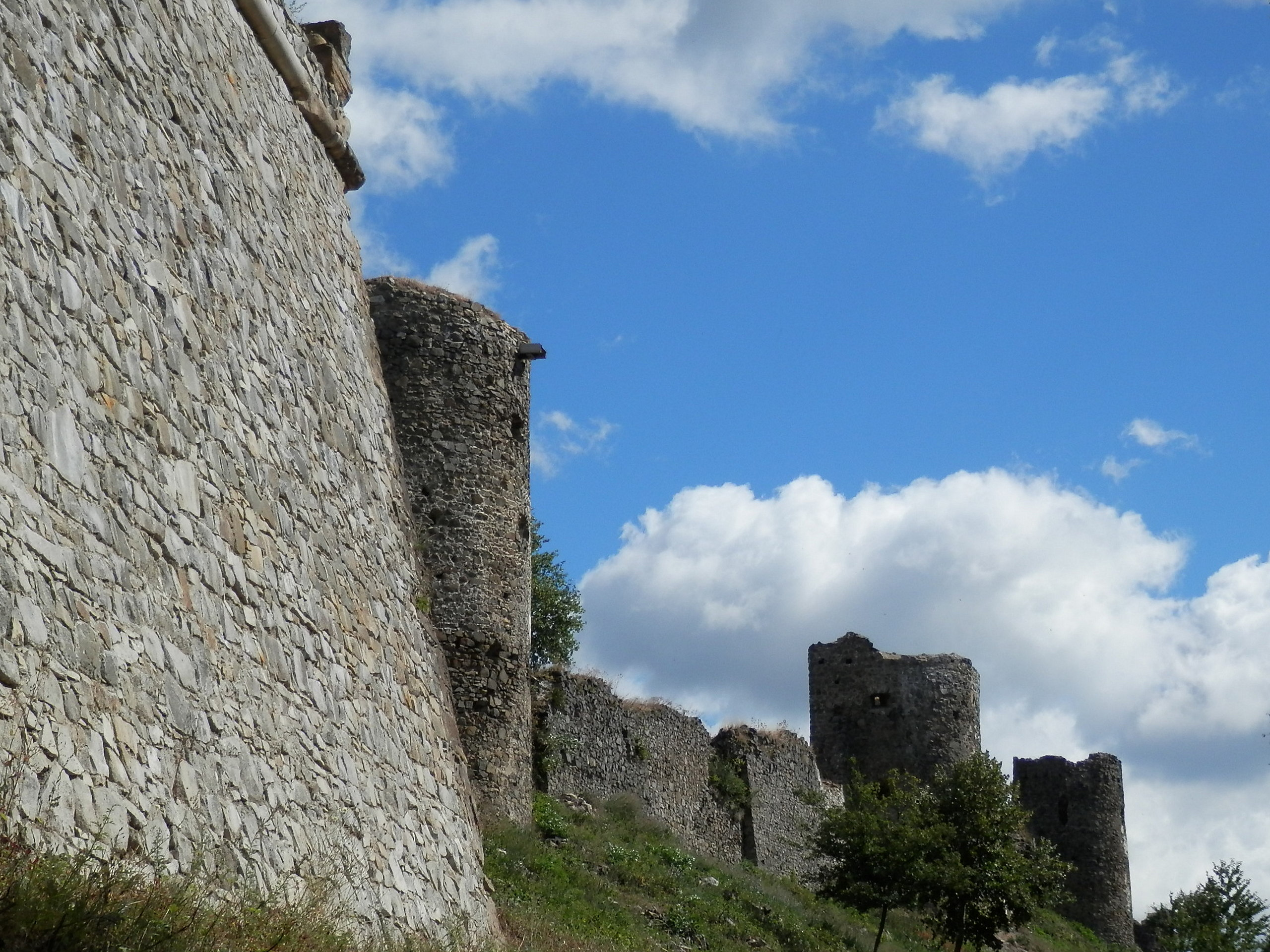
Perimeter walls and bastions from the outside (September 2013)

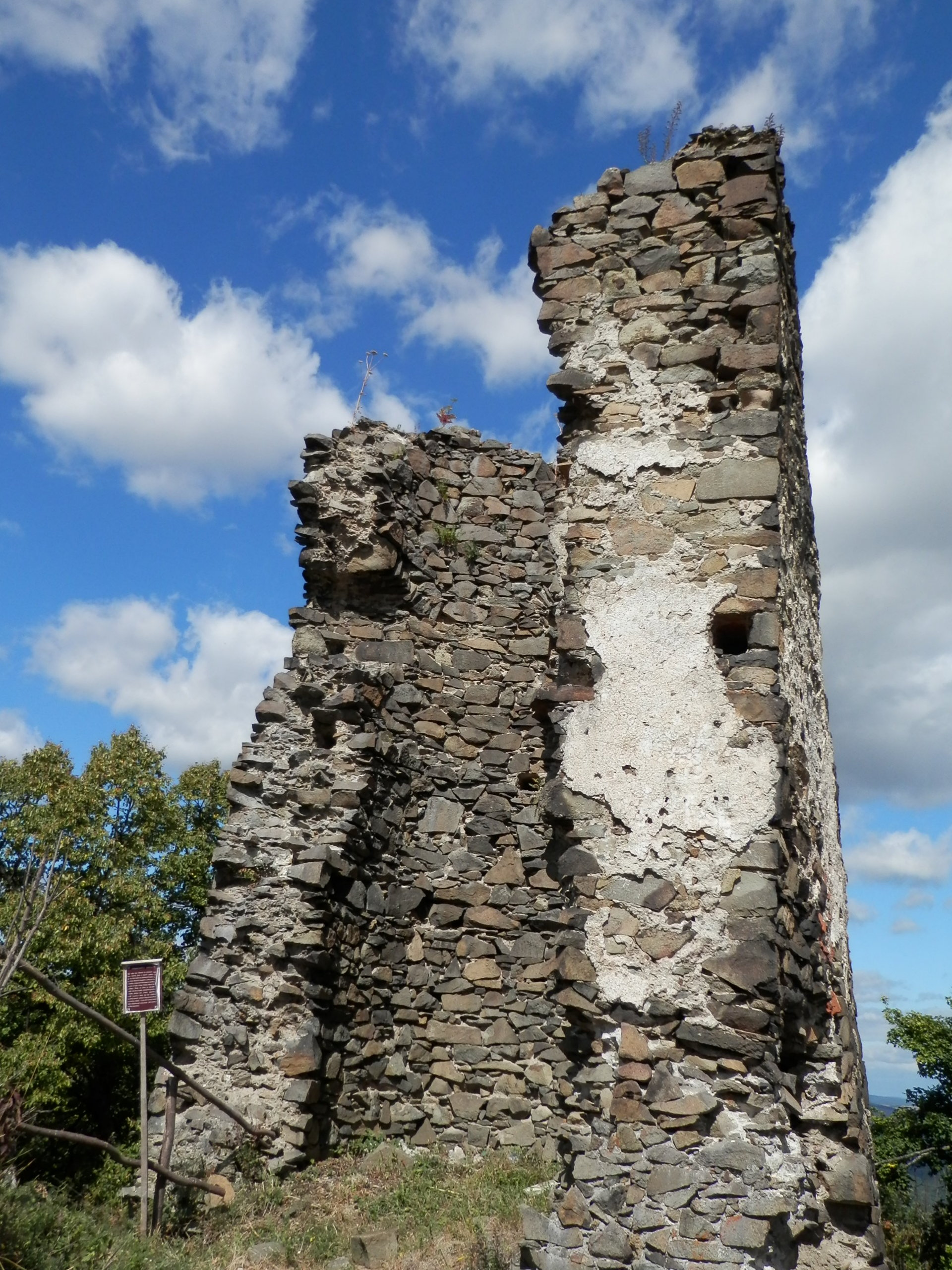
Ruins of a bastion (September 2013)

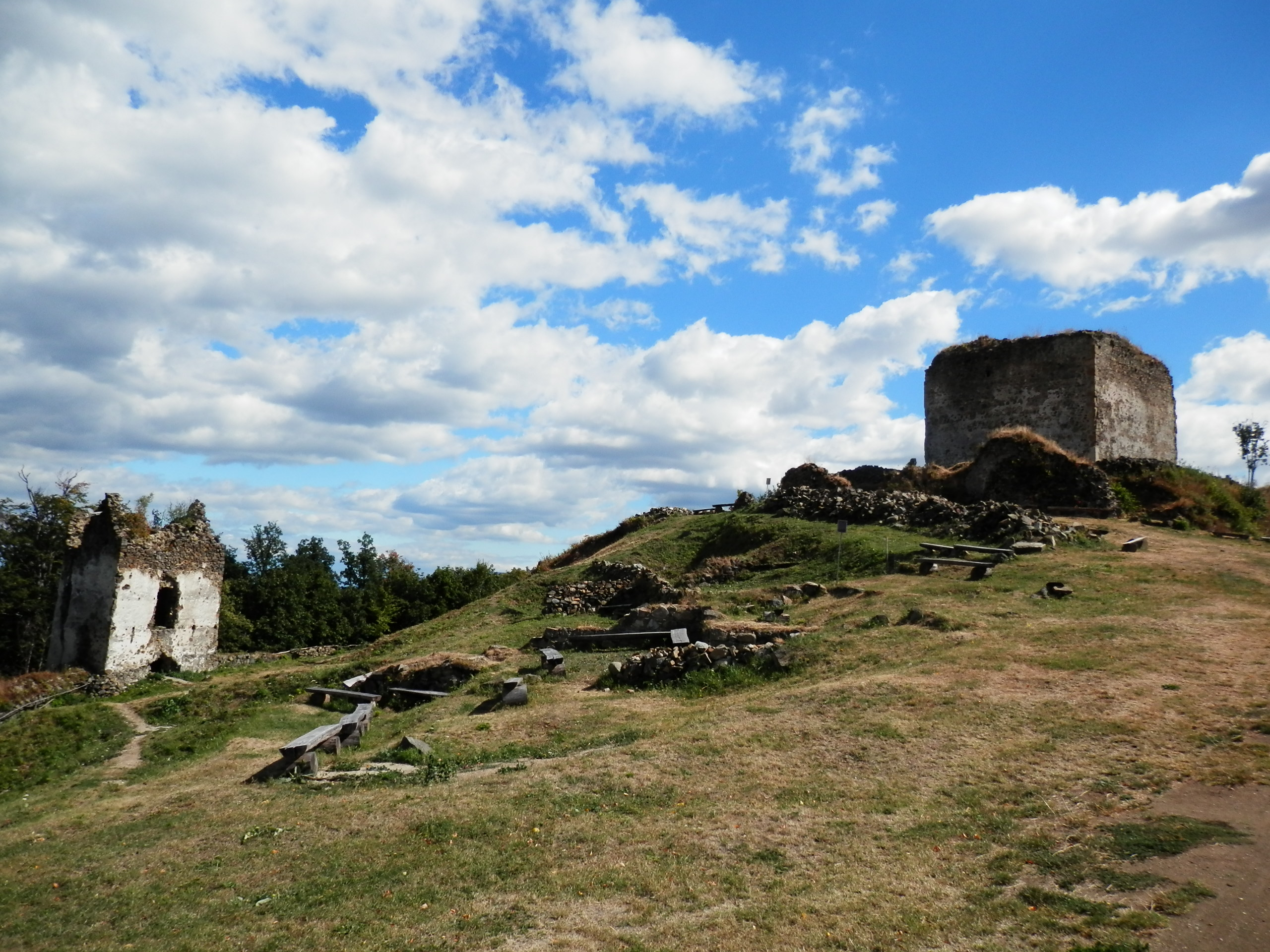
Main courtyard and ruins of the central castle, the keep visible on the hillock to the right

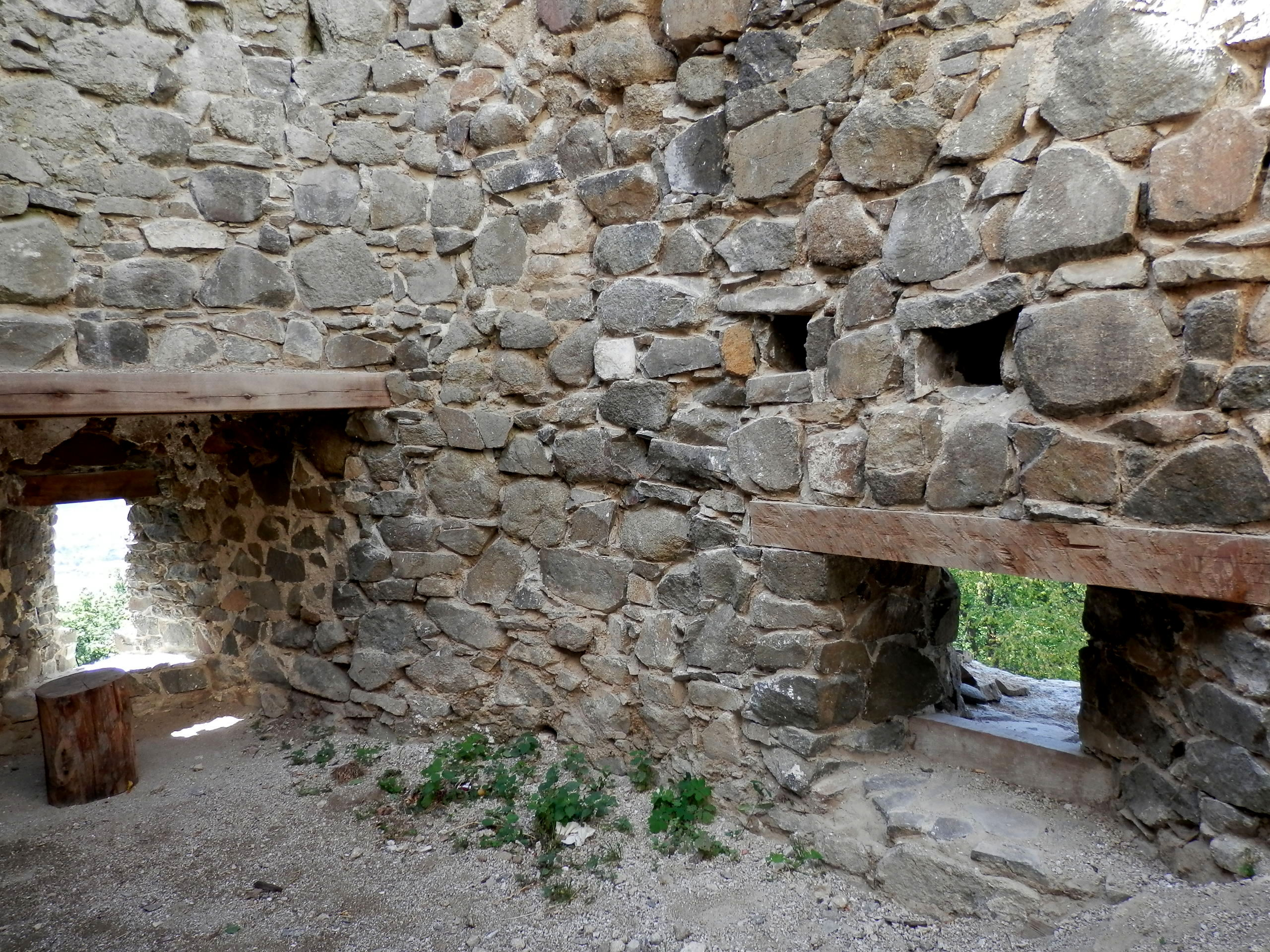
Interiors of a bastion ground floor after restoration (September 2013)

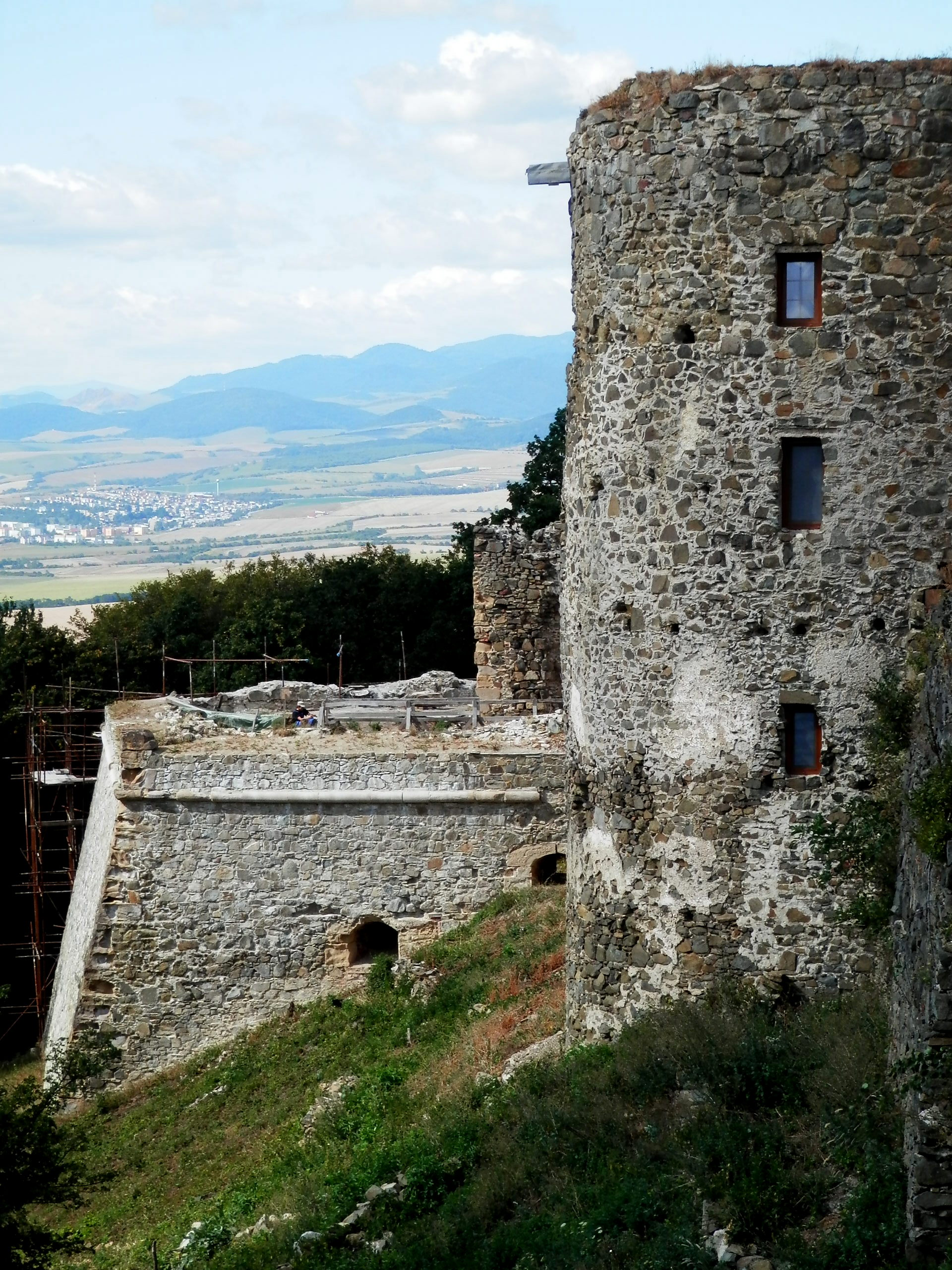
Tower (foreground, right) and major artillery bastion (background, left)

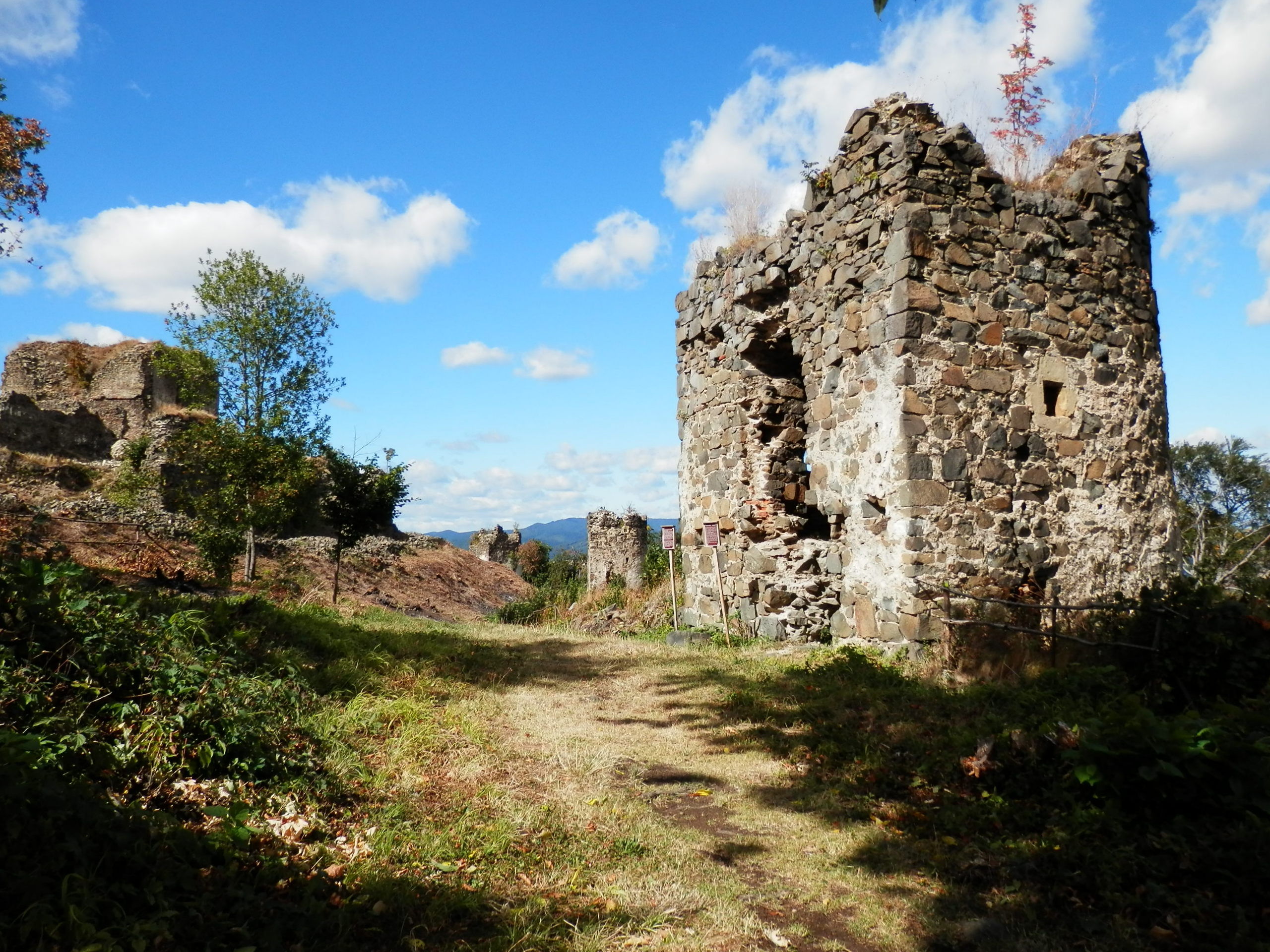
Ruins of the central castle, the keep visible on the hillock to the left

== See also ==
- List of castles in Slovakia
