= Jasenov Castle =

- Jasenovský hrad (in Slovak)
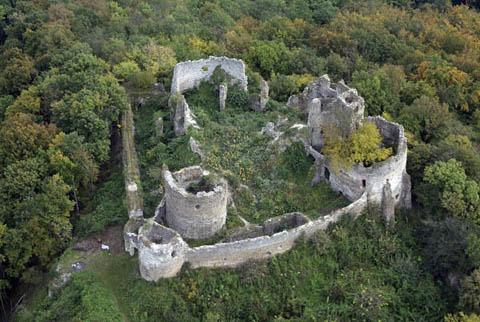
- Interactive map of the Jasenov Castle area
- Alternative names: Hrad Jasenov, Jeszenő (vára), castrum Jezenew (1330), castrum Jesenv (1442), etc.

General information
- Type: Ruined castle, Hilltop castle, Seat of noble family
- Location: Jasenov, Slovakia
- Coordinates: 48°53′27.89″N 21°54′38.22″E
- Elevation: ca 392 m (1286.08 ft) ASL
- Construction started: Late 13th century
- Owner: Municipality of Jasenov (legal owner); Združenie na záchranu Jasenovského hradu (caretaker association)

Jasenov Castle (Slovak Jasenovský hrad, Hungarian Jeszenő vára) is a ruined Gothic and Renaissance era stone castle above the village of Jasenov in Humenné District, Prešov Region, in east Slovakia. It is a hilltop castle located on a fairly steep, roughly cone-shaped hill with a limestone bedrock, in an altitude of approximately 392 m (1286.08 ft) above sea level. The eponymous village at the foot of the castle hill was founded as an adjoined castle settlement, similarly to several other villages in the region. Jasenov and Jasenov Castle lie in the traditional region of Zemplín. The castle is listed in the National Cultural Heritage list of the Monuments Board of the Slovak Republic.

== History ==
The beginnings of the stone castle date back to the second half of the 13th century. Jasenov is unique among the larger castles of the Upper Zemplín county (and region) due to being founded as a seat of a noble family from the beginning, rather than a castle founded by royal initiative. The original construction of the castle was begun by the Petény (Peteň, Pečeň) noble family in the late 1200s and led to the erection of the castle's keep and the original, core defensive perimeter.

In the 1310s, the castle was donated, along with the town of Humenné, the nearby Brekov Castle, and the surrounding manors, to the Drugeth family by Charles I. of Hungary. The Drugeth family retained ownership of the castle until its demise in 1644, when it was destroyed by one of the armies of George I. Rákoczi, during one of the period's anti-Habsburg uprisings.

The Drugeths did not rebuild the castle, as they have already started a construction of a renaissance style manor house in Hummené. In the 17th century, the use of castles has already started to decline, so the castle was never reconstructed.

== Conservation works ==
Jasenov Castle had mostly been untouched by conservation efforts since it became a ruin in the 17th century (much like other ruined or smaller castles in Slovakia). The first attempt at a larger conservation and reconstruction effort occurred during the 1900s and early 1910s. Gejza Andrássy, the then head of the Humenné branch of the Andrássy family, invested in resources and hired workmen and began work on reconstructing certain crumbling parts of the castle. The effort produced some favourable results in the area of the main outer gatehouse (remnants of these repairs are still visible today) and also led to the re-roofing of the original keep's tower and the outer gatehouse's northwest bastion. Period photographs and postcards of the castle dating from the 1910s to roughly the 1960s are easily recognisable by the presence of the restored roofs. All conservation works on Jasenov Castle were halted by World War I, due to economic reasons and the fact that the town of Humenné became part of the front line in late autumn 1914 and suffered major damage. In the post-war years, the original efforts were not continued. By the late 1960s and early 1970s, all remnants of the restored roofs had rotted away and collapsed, due to decades of neglect.

A concerted and systematic effort at new archaeological research and ruin conservation works on the castle was launched only recently, at the start of the 2010s. The castle is currently administered by the local historical association Združenie na záchranu Jasenovského hradu (ZNZJH, "Association for the Salvaging of Jasenov Castle"), crewed with professional archaeologists, historians, architects and masonry experts, as well as local and regional volunteers. The administration, research and conservation works of the association are conducted in official cooperation with the Jasenov municipality and the regional branch of the Monuments Board of the Slovak Republic. Research and conservation efforts have been ongoing since 2011 and have focused on clearing the castle hill of excess vegetation, archaeological research, and the gradual masonry conservation of the most affected parts of the ruin. The association also cooperates with local museums, the sister association on nearby Brekov Castle and with the Nadácia pre záchranu kultúrneho dedičstva ("Foundation for Salvaging Cultural Heritage").

== Gallery ==
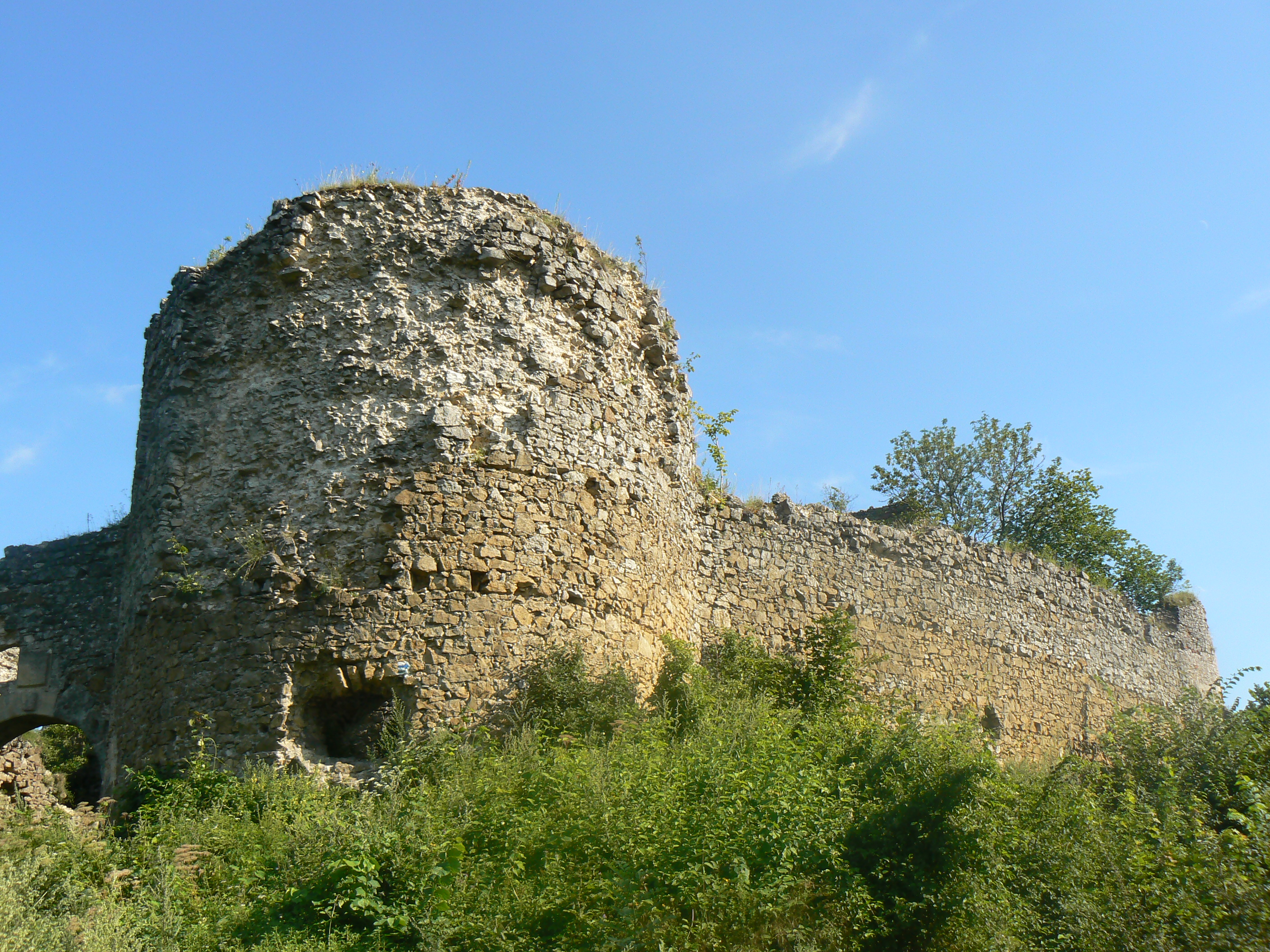
Close up on the main outer gatehouse and its protective bastion from the northwest (August 2008)

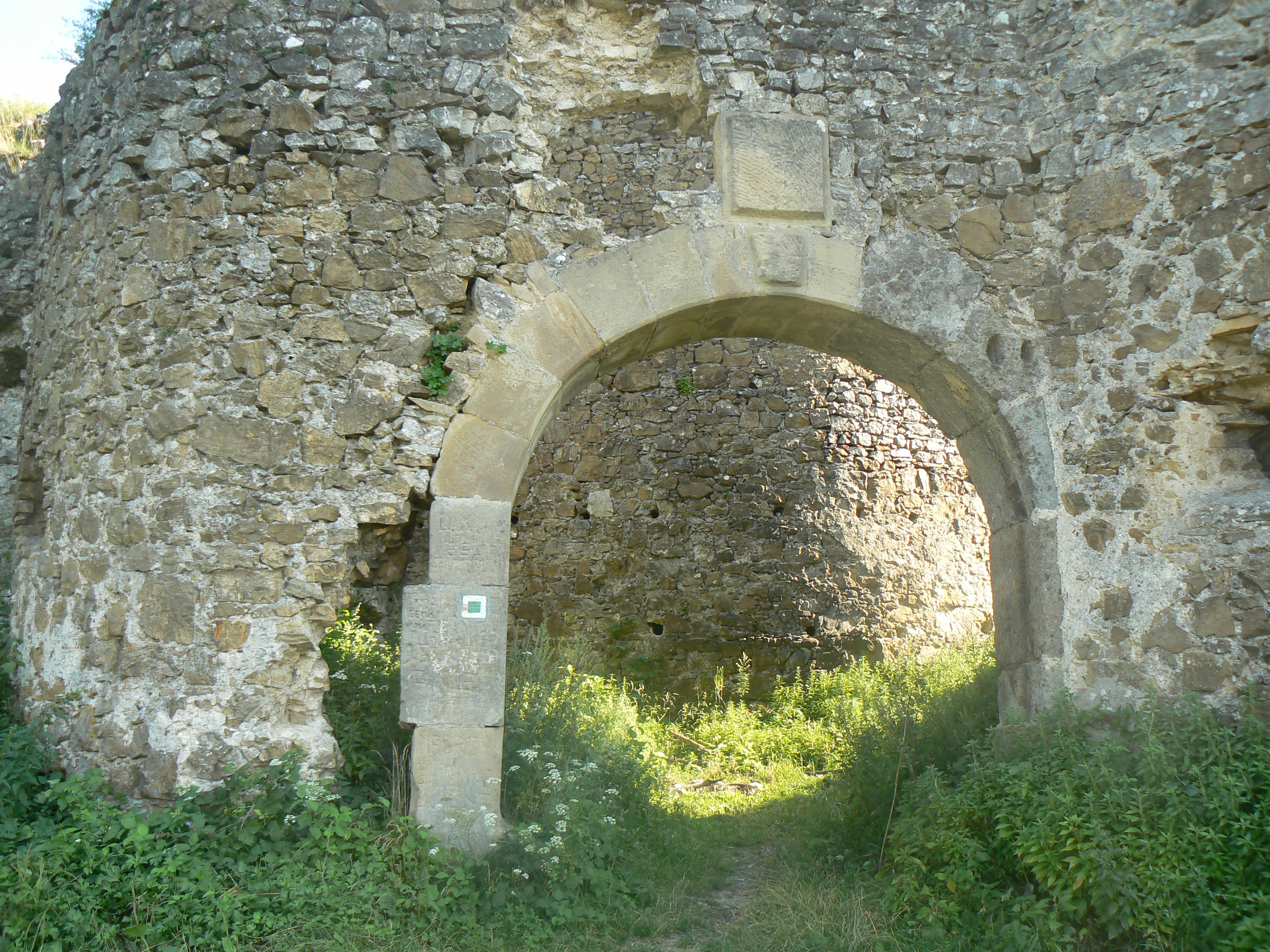
Main gatehouse of the outer perimeter, with some visible details from the early 20th century restoration attempt (August 2008)

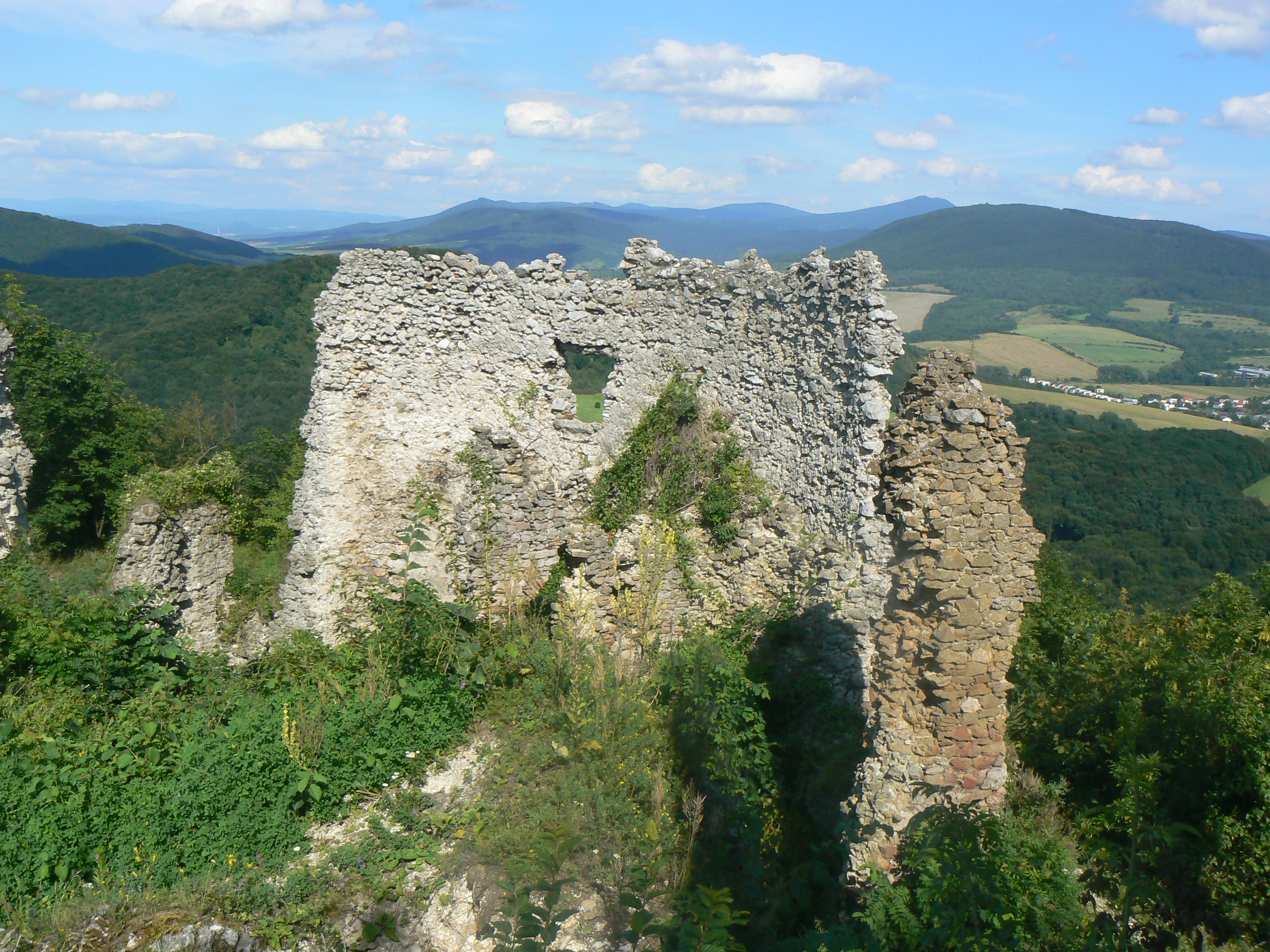
Ruins of one of the storage wings in the eastern perimeter of the castle (August 2008)

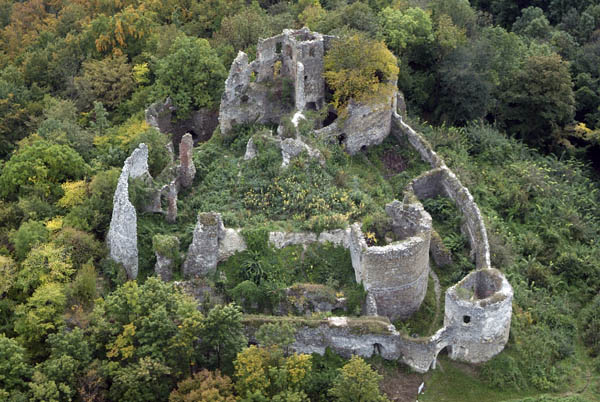
Aerial view of the castle from the northern side, facing southward (2006)

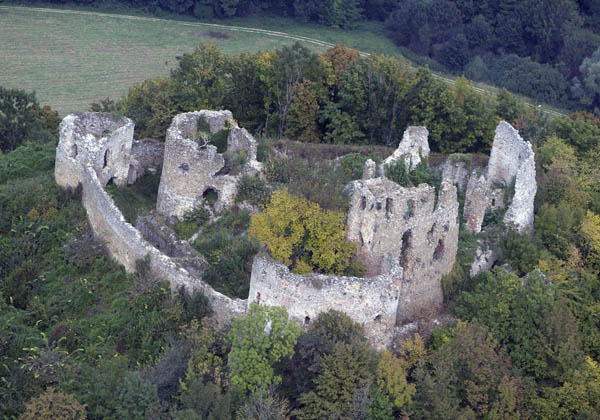
Aerial view of the castle from the southeastern side, facing to the west and northwest (2006)

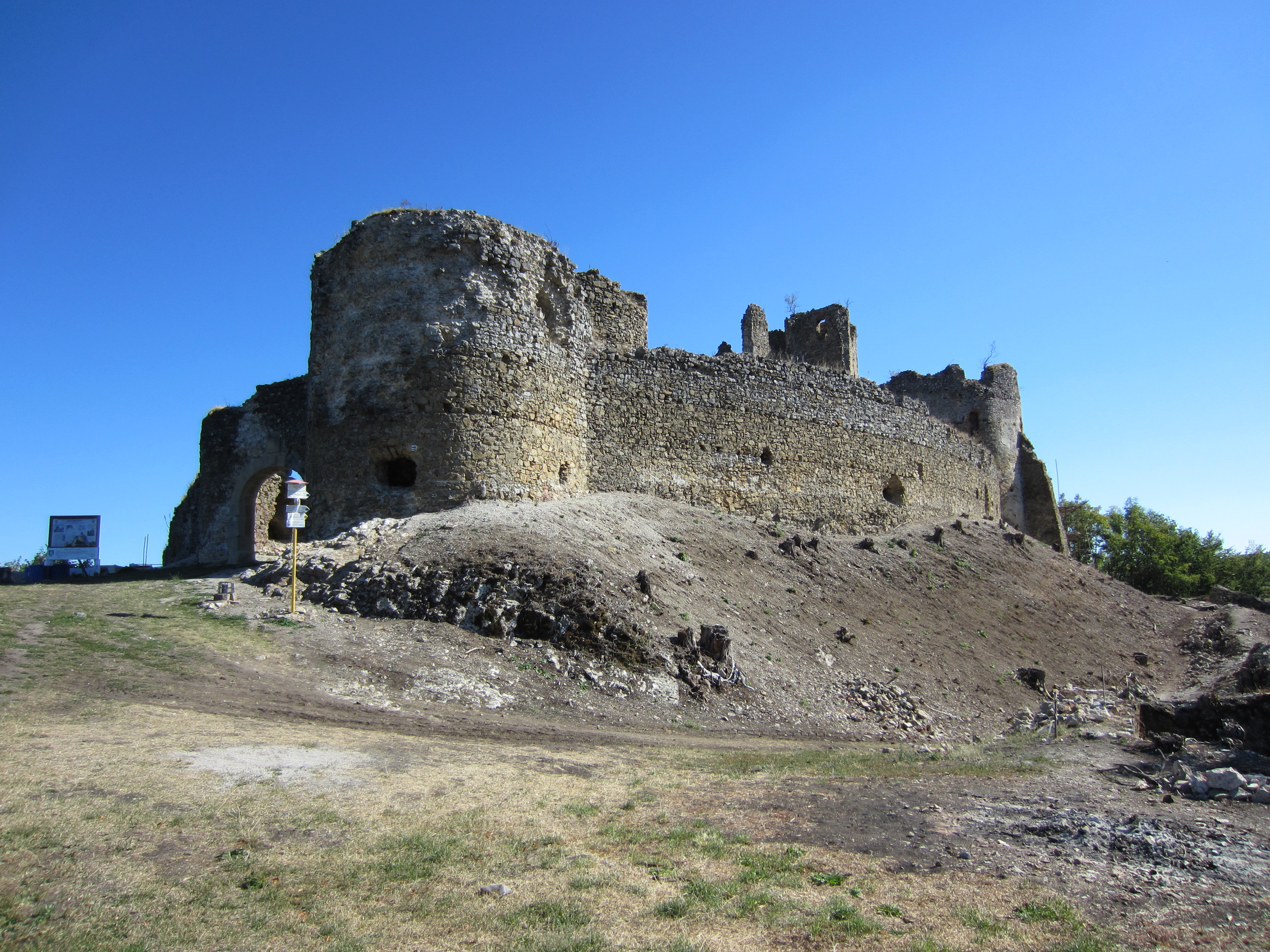
The castle from the northwest, after the start of the restoration works (September 2013)

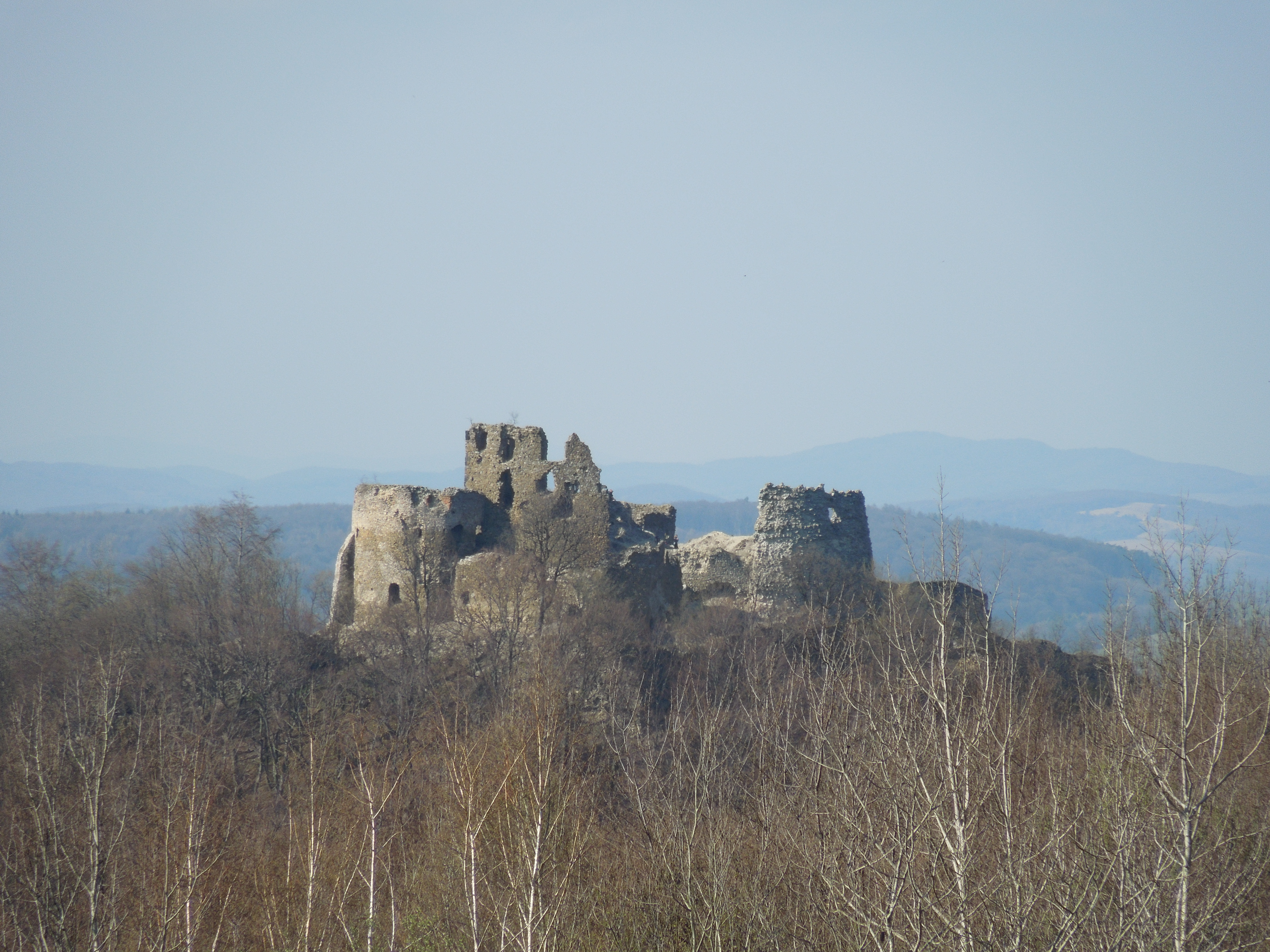
A more current view of the castle from the southeast, facing to the northwest, during late winter (March 2014)

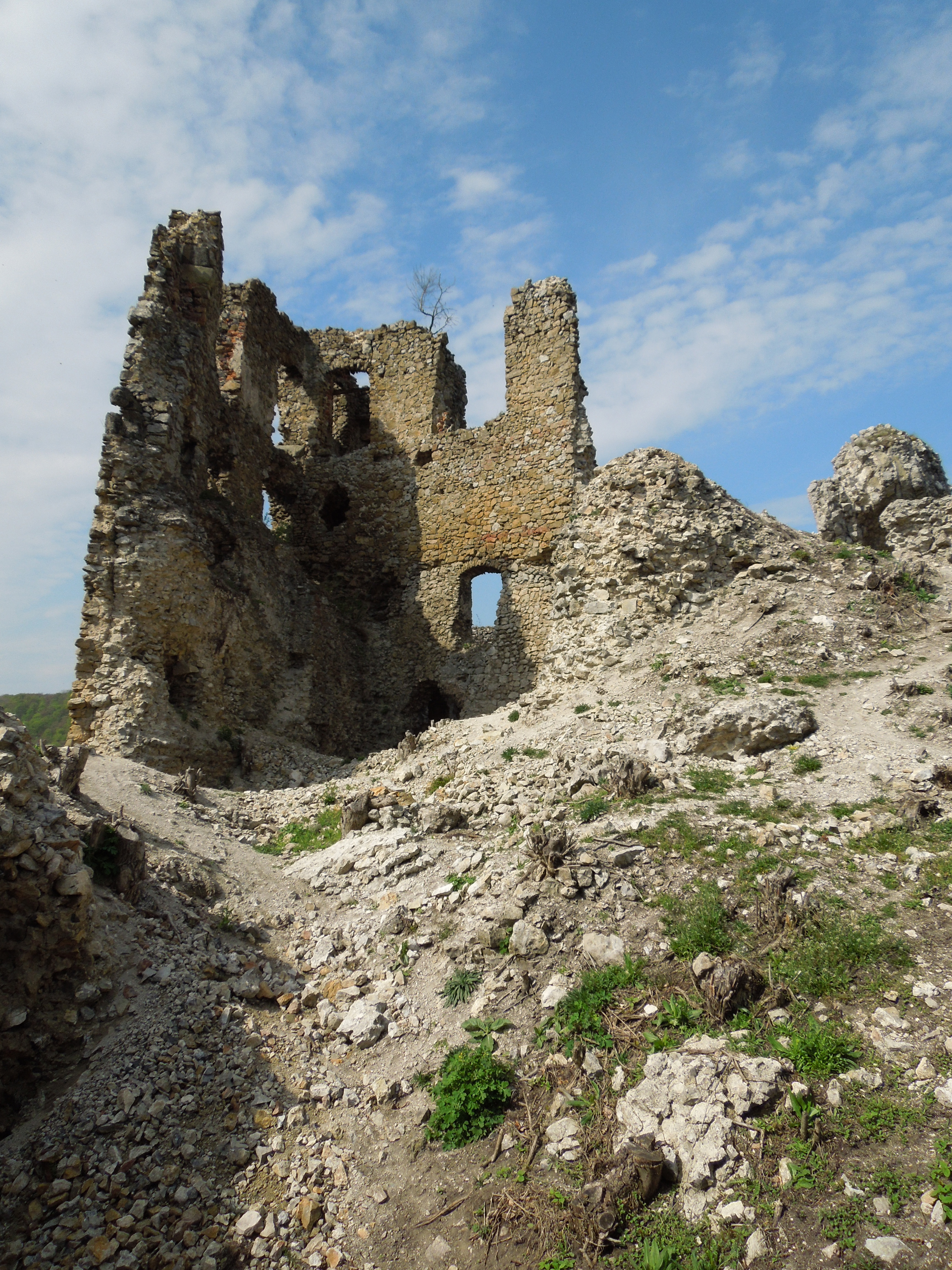
Ruins of the castle's keep, as seen from the eastern side (April 2014)

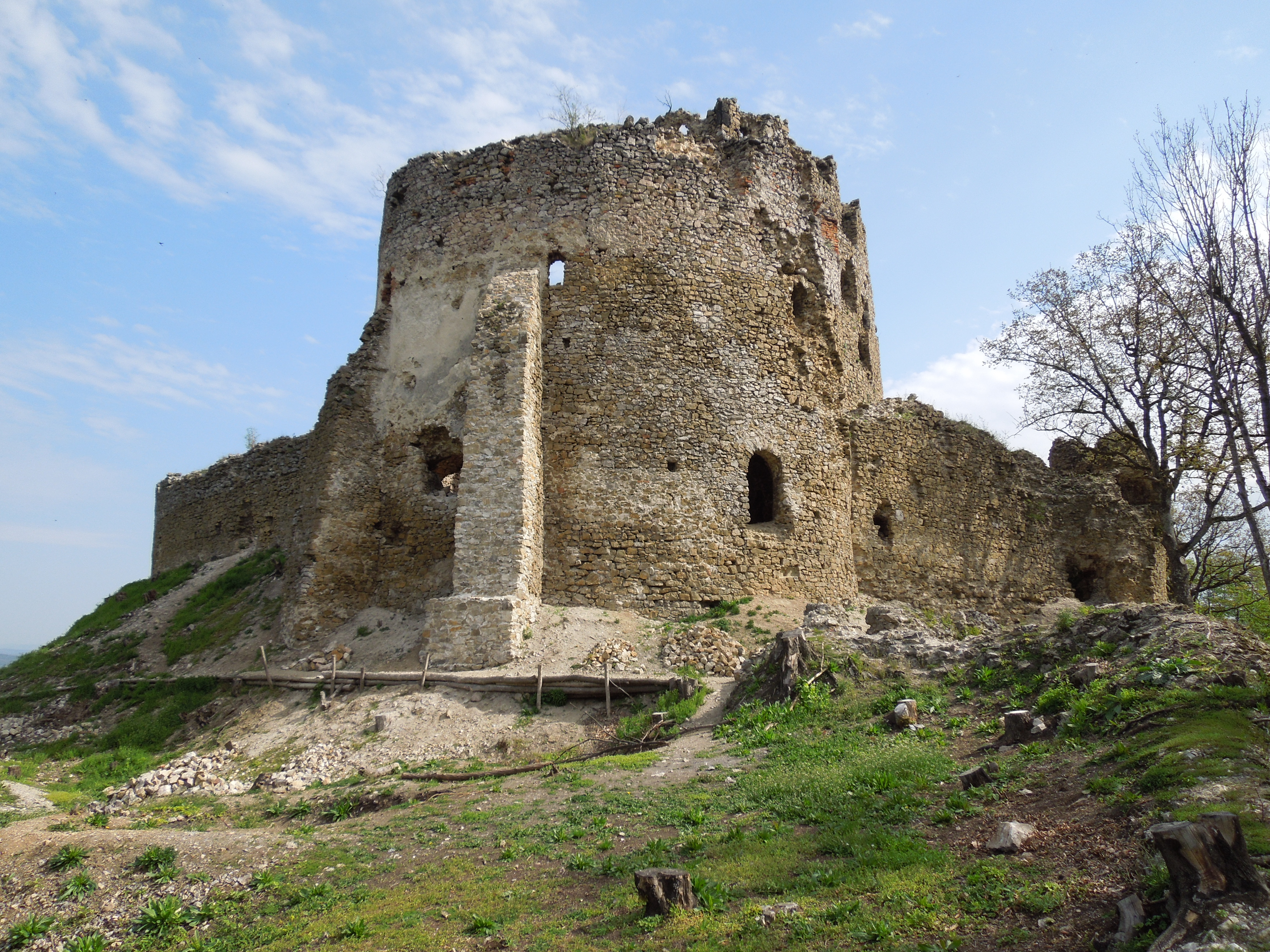
Ruins of the castle's largest bastion from the southwest (April 2014)

== See also ==
- List of castles in Slovakia
- Brekov Castle - A nearby, slightly older sister castle, part of the historical Humenné Manor of the Drugeth family, along with Jasenov Castle.
