= Humenné Mansion =

Historic site in Slovakia

- Humenský kaštieľ
- Humenné, Slovakia
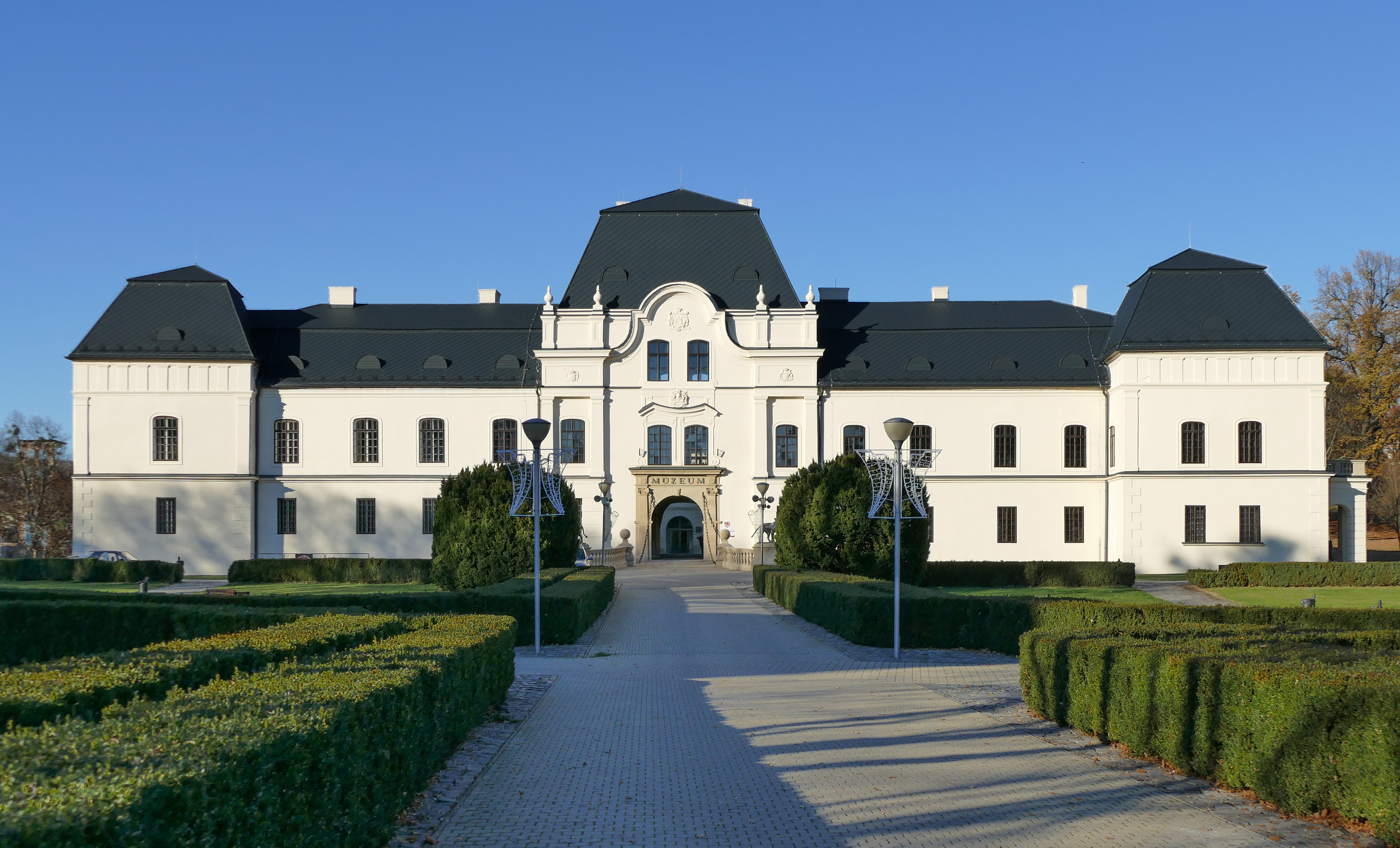

Site information
- Controlled by: Cultural Heritage Monuments of Slovakia
- Open to the public: Yes
- Condition: Preserved

Location
- Coordinates: 48.94°N 21.907778°E

Site history
- Built: 1614

Humenné Mansion (Slovak: Humenský kaštiel; also referred to as a castle) is a former residence of the Druget dynasty, built in the Renaissance style and rebuilt in the Neo-Baroque style after it became the property of the Andrássy family (1819). It is a national cultural monument together with the adjacent park. The castle houses the Vihorlat Museum. It is one of the largest and most extensive manor-type buildings in Slovakia.

The Humenné castle (built in the 15th century at the latest) was rebuilt into a Renaissance style fortified manor house between 1619 and 1641. The original fortified bastions of the manor house were demolished in 1787. During the 19th century, parts of the manor house were modified in Baroque Revival style and its interiors were modernized. Nowadays the manor house serves as the home of the Vihorlat Museum, dedicated to Humenné's history and Upper Zemplín regional history.

== History ==
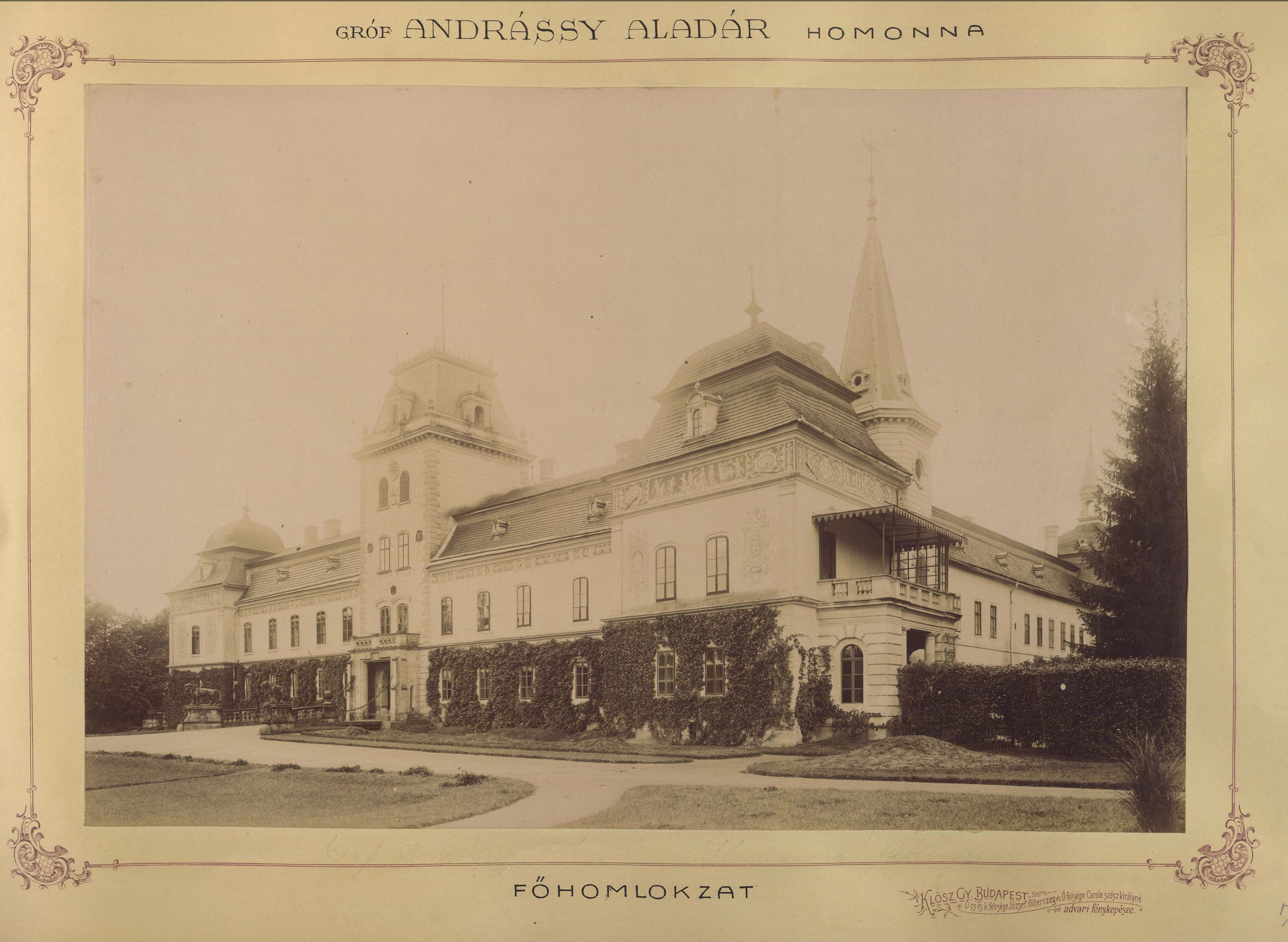
The mansion between the years 1895–1899

The predecessor of the present castle is believed to be a medieval moated castle, which, along with the nearby castles of Brekov and Jasenov, became the property of the Drugeth family in 1317, invited by the Hungarian King Charles Robert of Anjou. Traces of this fortification were found during renovation works in 1966. A Gothic castle was mentioned in 1449 in connection with a fire following occupation by Hussite mercenaries. There is a legend about a passage between the castle and Jasenov Castle (about 3 km away). Although it is not known whether such an escape route was actually made, excavations around the castle found a passage in the direction of the castle, but it ends after 50 meters. Traces of an underground passage were also found in the castle, but this too is only a few meters long.

A major reconstruction did not take place until 1610, when the Gothic fortress was transformed into a four-winged Renaissance castle with a large square courtyard, four corner towers, and an additional tower at the originally Gothic entrance gate. After another fire in 1684, the castle was rebuilt. Following the extinction of the Drugeth family that same year, the castle was owned by families such as Keglević, Althan, Zichy, and Csáky. Around the mid-18th century, the interior underwent significant redesign. This included, among other things, the Sala Terrena, illusionistic ceiling paintings, late Baroque figurative scenes, and magnificent furnishings in rooms such as the Coin Cabinet, the Maria Theresa Salon, the Hall of the Hungarian Kings, the Chinese Salon, and others. The arcades in the inner courtyard were walled up, a large balcony was built in the south wing, and attics were added.

Through the marriage of Etelka Szapáry to Count Károly Andrássy in 1812, the castle also came into the possession of the Andrássy family, who, like the Drugeths, are closely connected to its history. In the late 19th century, the exterior was redesigned in the pseudo-Baroque style, modeled on French châteaux, and a French and English park were laid out in the immediate vicinity.

Shortly before the end of the Second World War, the castle was damaged, and in 1946, it burned down after a fire destroyed its shingle roof, leaving only remnants of the original furnishings. The Andrássy family was expropriated at the same time as the war ended. Although the burned-out roof was provisionally repaired, the actual reconstruction did not begin until 1964 and continued until 1971. The renovated castle was reopened in 1972. Further renovations took place in 2015–16, during which, among other measures, the copper roof was replaced with an aluminum one. It was once again renovated in 2021.

== Museum ==
In 1960, the local government decided that the castle building, which was undergoing renovation, would house a museum. The Vihorlát Museum's exhibition was significantly expanded in the 1970s and 1980s, and today it has more than a hundred thousand exhibits. The permanent exhibitions present the life of the nobility and folk crafts, and the museum also hosts art and natural science exhibitions. The museum's attractions are the Hungarian Royal Gallery and the treasure of Celtic-Dacian coins.
