= Humenné =

- Town
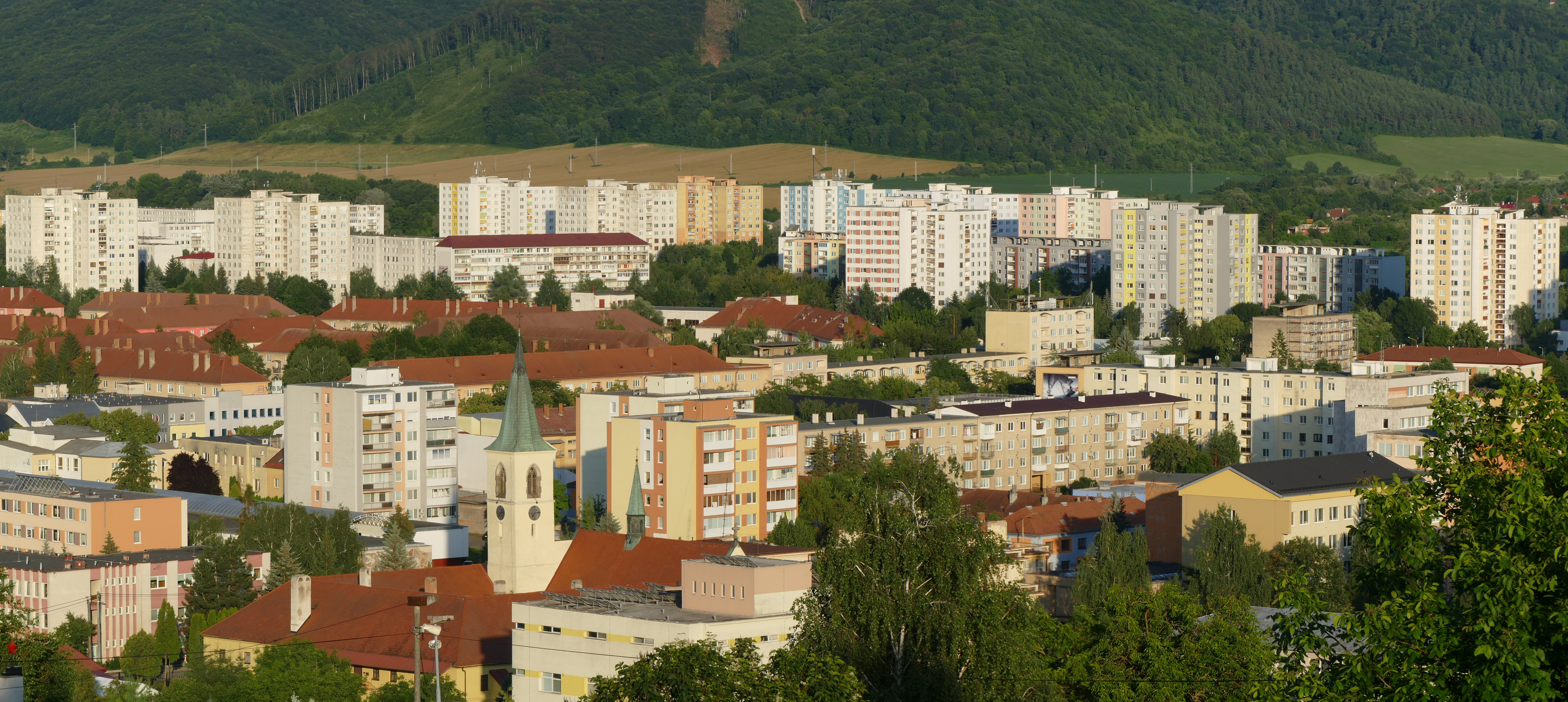
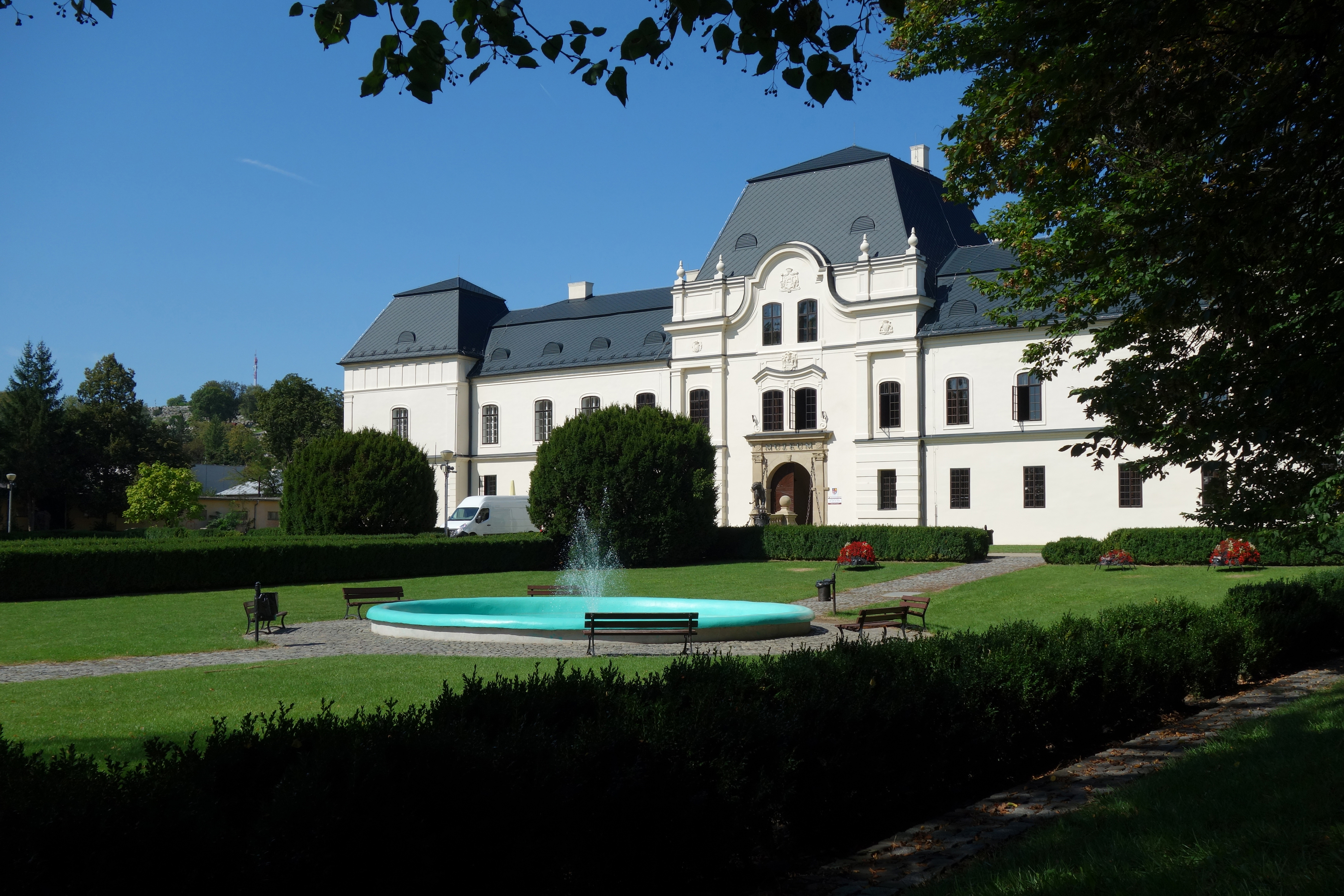
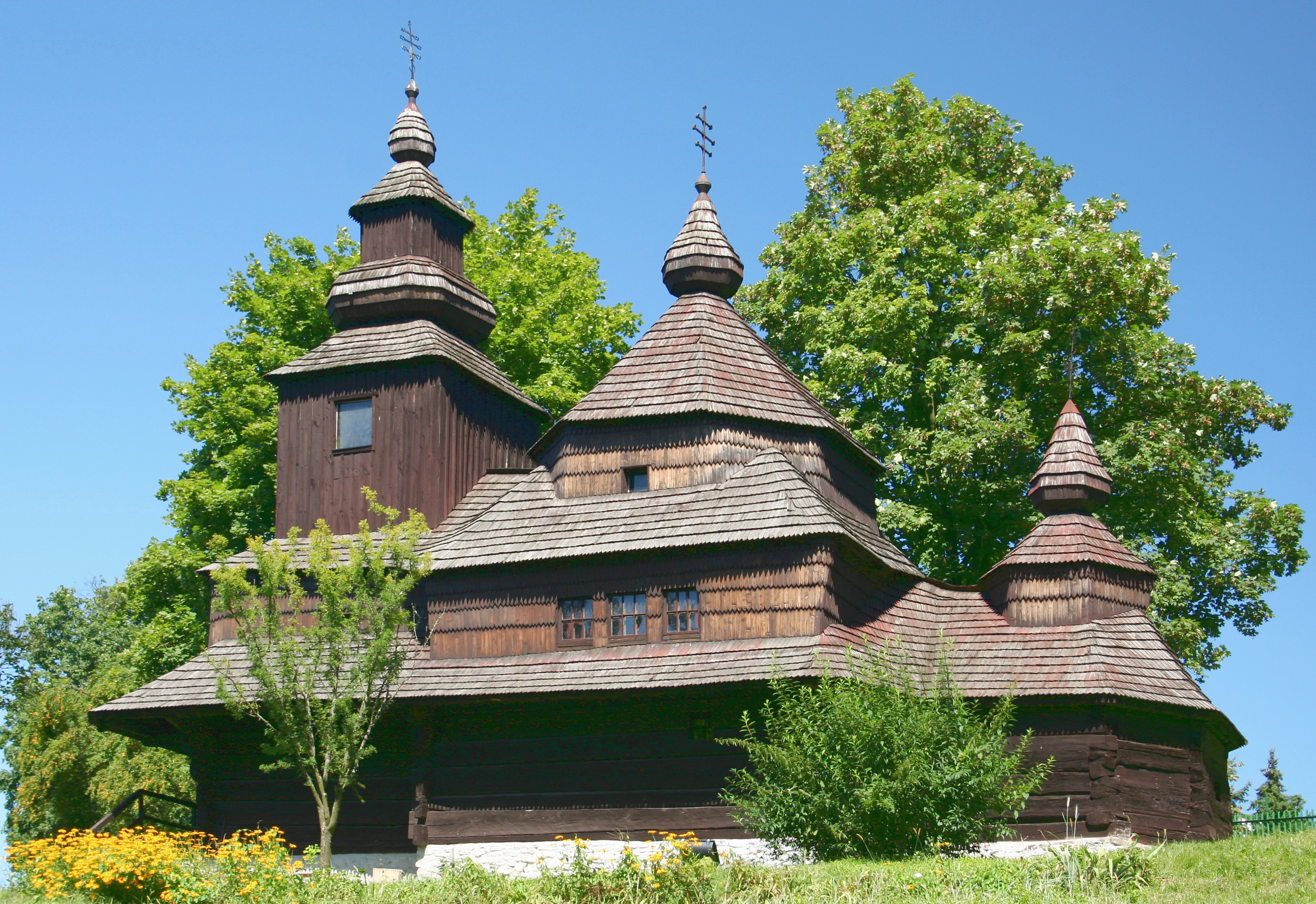
- From the top, Panoramic view of Humenné, Humenné Mansion, Church of Archangel Michael

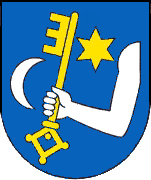
- Flag Coat of arms

- Location of Humenné in the Prešov Region Location of Humenné in Slovakia
- Coordinates: 48°56′09″N 21°54′24″E
- Country: Slovakia
- Region: Prešov
- District: Humenné
- Historical region: Zemplín
- First mentioned: 1317

Government
  - Mayor: Miloš Meričko

Area
  - Total: 32.26 km^{2} (12.46 sq mi)
- (2022)
- Elevation: 155 m (509 ft)

Population (2025)
  - Total: 29,179
- Time zone: UTC+1 (CET)
  - Summer (DST): UTC+2 (CEST)
- Postal code: 066 01
- Area code: +421 57
- Vehicle registration plate (until 2022): HE
- Website: www.humenne.sk

Humenné (Hungarian: Homonna; Ukrainian: Гуменне) is a town in the Prešov Region ("kraj") in eastern Slovakia and the second largest town of the historic Zemplín region. It lies at the volcanic Vihorlat mountains and at the confluence of the Laborec and Cirocha Rivers.

== Geography ==
The municipality lies at an altitude of 155 metres (509 ft) and covers an area of 32.26 km^{2} (12.46 sq mi) (2025).

== Names and etymology ==
The name comes from a common Slavic word "humno" (gumьno). In Slovak "backyard", the exact meaning may differ in dialects. Initially, it was recorded as a feminine adjective (1322 Homonna, 1332 Humenna, 1381 Humenna, 1391 Humonna) then the neuter Humenné.

== Landmarks ==
Humenné is the center of one of the easternmost districts ("okres") in Slovakia. The most attractive places are the Vihorlat Mountains boasting of their Morské oko lake, and the Bukovské vrchy (section of the Bieszczady Mountains) at the border of Slovakia, Poland, and Ukraine, which are part of the Poloniny National Park. Humenné is surrounded by ruins of medieval castles and an open-air museum of architecture situated in the town park.

Castles and mansions near Humenné:

- Brekov Castle (in ruins, 7 km or 4 1/2 mi to the southwest)
- Jasenov Castle (in ruins, 3 km or 2 mi to the south)
- Čičava Castle (in ruins, 14 km or 8 1/2 mi to the southwest )
- Kamenica nad Cirochou: Classicistic mansion from 1773 (at the moment closed to the public, 7 km or 4 1/2 mi to the east)

== History ==
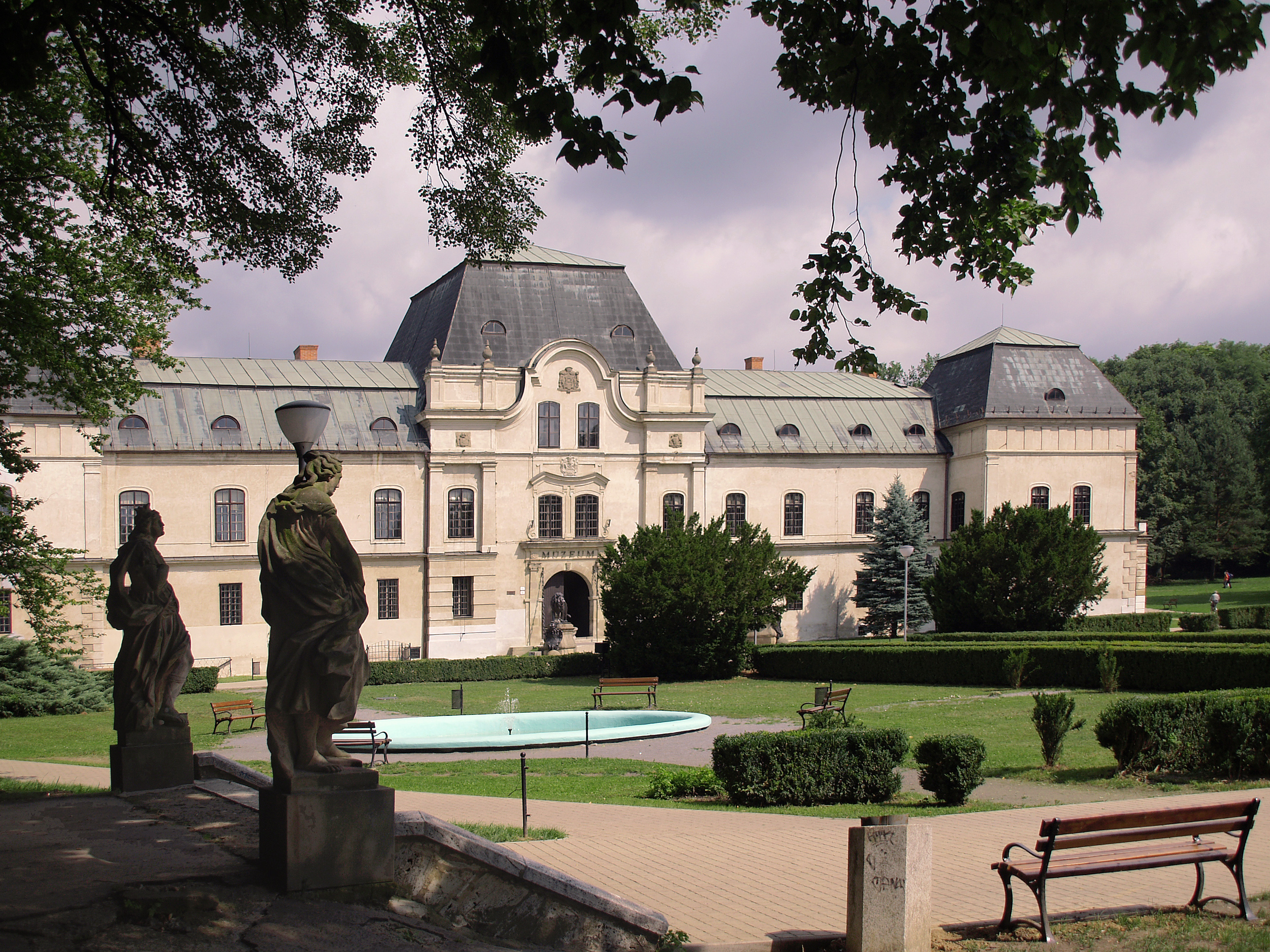
Humenné Mansion

The Laborec River and the Carpathian Mountains predetermined the development of the town and its surroundings, a silent witness of which has been the volcano Vihorlat – with a summit elevation of 1,075 metres (3,527 ft), the highest point of the Vihorlat mountains. Thanks to its advantageous location and pleasant climate, preconditioned by the neighboring mountains, the town has been an attractive place for people since the Stone Age, which is evidenced by several archaeological findings. The Slavic forefathers of the Slovaks gradually moved to the basin of Humenné during the great migration of peoples, starting in the 5th century.

An intensive and organized settlement of this area started as late as the middle of the 13th century, after the Mongol raids. The first written document mentioning Humenné dates back to 1317. The history of Humenné is closely connected with the Drugeth (Drugets, Drugetovci), a distinguished aristocratic family originally from Naples, who, accompanying the king Charles Robert of Anjou, came to the Kingdom of Hungary (the territory of present-day Slovakia was part of the Kingdom of Hungary) at the beginning of the 14th century. The Drugeths made Humenné their seat and changed it into the centre of one of the largest feudal dominions in Upper-Hungary. King Matthias Corvinus conferred civic privileges (town status) on the town, which were validated by a seal with coat of arms. At that time, the town was crossed by an important trade route connecting the Kingdom of Hungary with the Kingdom of Poland. Humenné is mentioned among royal customs offices, and later on, it received the right of storehousing and supposedly market rights, too. This was also the time of an ever-increasing influence of shepherd colonization from Transcarpathia by the so-called Walachians (Ruthenes, Poles, and Romanians).

The most significant town monument, a Renaissance castle, was built on the place of an original stone castle in about 1610. The castle came to be an indispensable characteristic feature of the town and serves as a museum and cultural site at present.

In 1613, during the Counter Reformation, a Jesuit college was established as the first secondary school in the history of Humenné.

In 1619, about 10,000 Polish riders—a lisowczycy—led by Walenty Rogawski, defeated the army of George I Rákóczi in Battle of Humenné. Rákóczi was an insurgent against the Habsburgs and an ally of Gábor Bethlen, Duke of Transylvania.

The Drugeth line died out in 1684, and new feudal lords moved in, notably the Csákys and the Wandernats.

The abolition of some feudal duties and the reforms of Maria Theresa promoted the development of crafts, and Humenné became the seat of the so-called "salt office". The town's population consisted of Slovaks, Ruthenes, Hungarians and Jews. Latin was used as the administrative language, which appeared to be a stabilizing factor in such a mixture of nationalities.

The Andrássy family from Transylvania started to influence the history of Humenné in the 19th century, a period characterized by economic growth. Moreover, many new buildings were erected at that time. The main fields of activity of town inhabitants were agriculture, crafts, and trade. The first train appeared in Humenné in 1871, stimulating the development of trade and wood cutting. In 1899, the first business academy in Austria-Hungary was established in Humenné. Toward the end of the 19th century, Humenné counted 4,000 inhabitants.

The 20th century brought along a cultural revival. Humenné was famous for its markets and fairs. This promising, though timid, development was interrupted by World War I. A short period of the existence of Czechoslovakia between the two world wars proved to have positive effects upon the life of Humenné. As a corollary of World War II, however, all the effort had to start from the very beginning. On 26 November 1944, Humenné was captured by troops of the Soviet 18th Army, acting as a part of the 4th Ukrainian Front, after which the town became again part of Czechoslovakia.

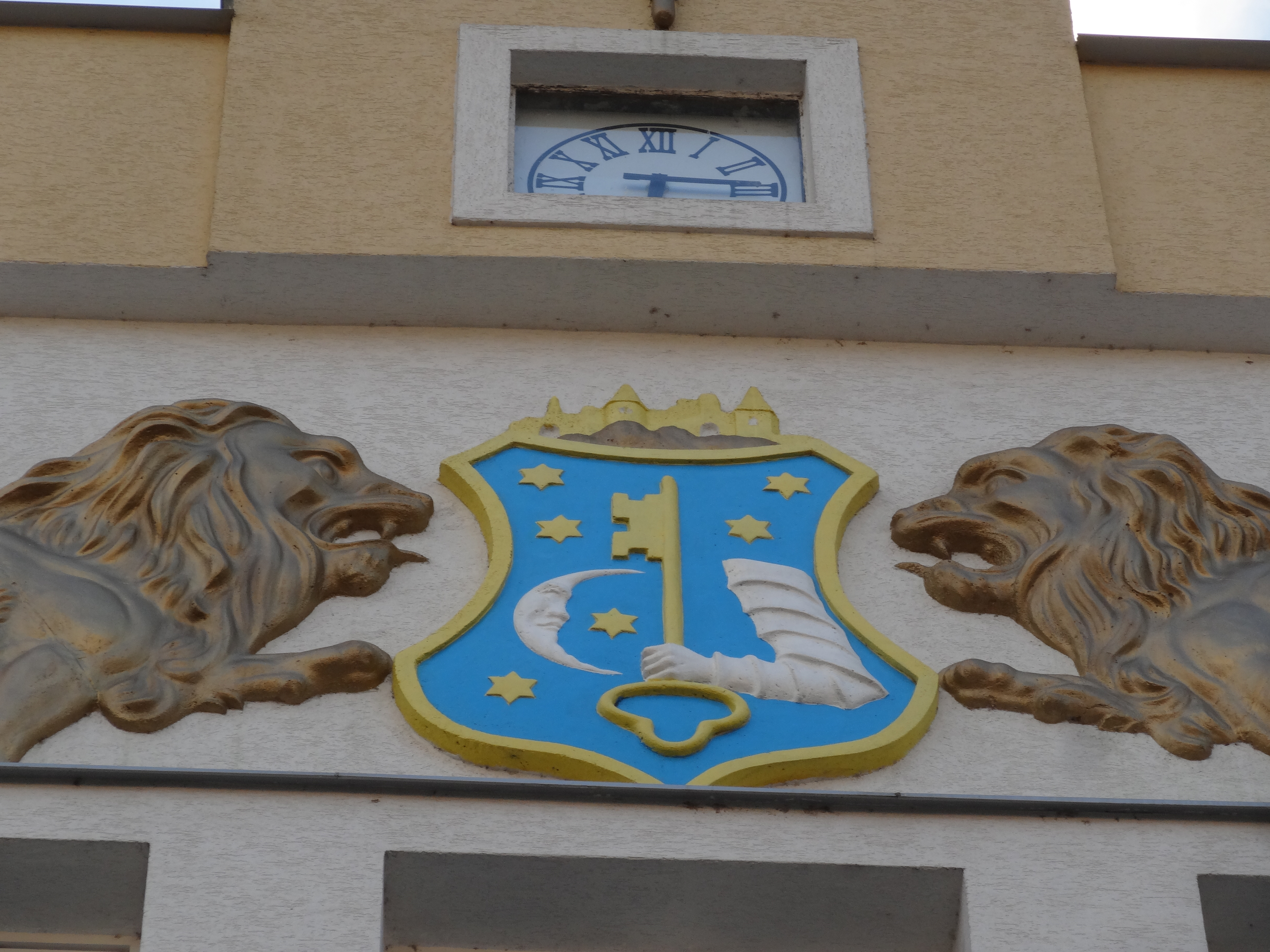
Coat of Arms of the town of Humenné, on the façade of a historical building in the centre of the town

Until 1956, Humenné was an administrative rather than an economic centre. Then the construction of a plant for the production of textile polyamide fibres, the present Chemlon company, triggered a real chain effect on the town's growth. Humenné was gradually becoming a centre of chemical, building, food, and mechanical engineering industries. This had a positive impact on the development of technical colleges. The industrial development entailed large-scale housing projects, and the town area was completed by new housing estates. While 7,000 inhabitants were living in Humenné in 1948, the population now amounts to over 33,000.

== Population ==
Historical population
Year	Pop.	±%
1970	16,649	—
1980	25,883	+55.5%
1991	34,167	+32.0%
2001	35,157	+2.9%
2011	35,053	−0.3%
2021	31,359	−10.5%
Source: Censuses

Population statistic (10 years)
Year	1995	2005	2015	2025
Count	36,306	35,028	33,945	29,179
Difference		−3.52%	−3.09%	−14.04%

Population statistic
Year	2024	2025
Count	29,567	29,179
Difference		−1.31%

It has a population of 29,179 people (31 December 2025).

=== Ethnicity ===
Census 2021 (1+%)
Ethnicity	Number	Fraction
Slovak	26,965	85.98%
Rusyn	3677	11.72%
Not found out	2968	9.46%
Romani	373	1.18%
Total	31,359	

In year 2021 was 31,359 people by ethnicity 26,965 as Slovak, 3677 as Rusyn, 2968 as Not found out, 373 as Romani, 302 as Ukrainian, 230 as Czech, 80 as Other, 76 as Hungarian, 49 as Polish, 45 as Russian, 35 as Vietnamese, 15 as German, 15 as English, 10 as Moravian, 7 as Irish, 7 as Italian, 7 as Serbian, 4 as Jewish, 4 as Austrian, 4 as Greek, 3 as Romanian, 3 as French, 3 as Croatian, 3 as Bulgarian, 1 as Turkish, 1 as Silesian and 1 as Canadian.

Note on population: The difference values of population numbers in the table "Population statistic" and in the sections "Ethnicity" & "Religion" is caused by the use of various statistical methods.

In 1910, 48.6% were Roman Catholic, 34.8% Jewish, 12.3% Greek Catholic, while 38.2% reported Hungarian as their primary language, 30.8% Slovak, and 21.1% Yiddish or German.

=== Religion ===
Census 2021 (1+%)
Religion	Number	Fraction
Roman Catholic Church	15,290	48.76%
Greek Catholic Church	6486	20.68%
None	4246	13.54%
Not found out	2882	9.19%
Eastern Orthodox Church	1542	4.92%
Total	31,359	

In year 2021 was 31,359 people by religion 15,290 from Roman Catholic Church, 6486 from Greek Catholic Church, 4246 from None, 2882 from Not found out, 1542 from Eastern Orthodox Church, 253 from Evangelical Church, 134 from Apostolic Church, 104 from Jehovah's Witnesses, 93 from Calvinist Church, 79 from Ad hoc movements, 66 from Other, 50 from Christian Congregations in Slovakia, 40 from Buddhism, 30 from Other and not ascertained christian church, 11 from Paganism and natural spirituality, 10 from Islam, 9 from Jewish community, 9 from Church of the Brethren, 6 from Seventh-day Adventist Church, 4 from Old Catholic Church, 4 from United Methodist Church, 3 from Hinduism, 3 from Czechoslovak Hussite Church, 2 from Church of Jesus Christ of Latter-day Saints, 2 from Bahá'i Community and 1 from Baptists Church.

== Sports ==
=== Football ===
Humenné had one club with top flight history: FC Chemlon Humenné, winning the Slovak Cup in 1996. FC Chemlon also played UEFA Cup Winners' Cup in the 1996–97 season. The club had a more turbulent time during its name changes as HFC Humenné, 1. HFC Humenné and ŠK Futura Humenné and could not replicate its success as Chemlon. In August 2015, the licence of ŠK Futura was bought by FK Drustav Svidník, but the Slovak Football Association rules do not allow for changing club names only a few days before the start of the season. The Svidník club also announced a merger between FK Drustav and ŠK Futura within one year, with a new name.

FK Humenné is the second club in Humenné, established in 2003, playing home matches at the Ihrisko pri Mlyne Stadium, they currently play in the 4th division.

=== Volleyball ===
Humenné had one of the most successful teams in Slovak volleyball, VK Chemes Humenné. Due to a dispute about finances between the owner and the town, the club was transferred to another town: Spišká Nová Ves. Nowadays, there is no volleyball club in Humenné.

=== Ice hockey ===
The city's ice hockey club is MHK Humenné, which competes in Slovak 1.Liga (2nd level).

== Largest companies in Humenné (2015) ==
- Andritz Slovakia
- Nexis Fibers
- Reinter

== Notable natives and residents ==
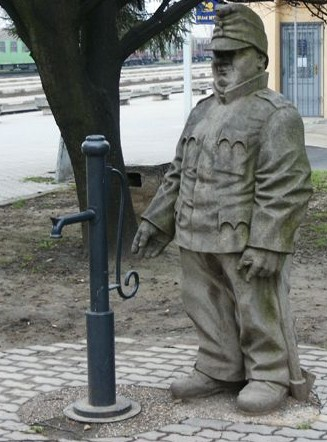
Statue of The Good Soldier Švejk

- Štefan Babjak (1931–2008), opera singer
- Peter Breiner (born 1957), pianist, conductor, and composer
- Yuri Dojc (born 1946), Artist and Photographer
- Ladislav Grosman (1921–1981), Oscar prize winner
- František Kasanič (born 1976), professional boxer
- Michal Kováč (1930–2016) – first Slovak president in the modern era
- Gabriel A. Levicky, Artist
- Lucia Nimcová (born 1977), photographer
- Erik Tomáš (born 1975), politician
- István Thomán (1862–1940) Hungarian piano virtuoso and music educator
- Jozef Tomko (1924–2022), cardinal
- Ágoston Trefort (1817–1888), Hungarian politician, who served as Minister of Religion and Education from 1872 until his death. He was the President of the Hungarian Academy of Sciences from 1885

== Twin towns – sister cities ==
Humenné is twinned with:

- Darney, France
- Jarosław, Poland
- Mátészalka, Hungary
- Mukachevo, Ukraine
- Perechyn, Ukraine
- Przemyśl, Poland
- Sanok, Poland
- Šibenik, Croatia
- Třebíč, Czech Republic
- Vidnoye, Russia

== See also ==
- The Good Soldier Švejk
