= František Kasanič =

Slovak boxer

Fero Kasanic
Personal information
- Nationality: (Slovakia) Slovak
- Born: František Kasanič; 2 March 1976 (age 50) Humenné, Czechoslovakia
- Height: 5 ft 10 in (1.78 m)
- Weight: cruiserweight

Boxing career
- Stance: Orthodox

Boxing record
- Total fights: 16
- Wins: 12
- Win by KO: 12
- Losses: 4
- Draws: 0

František Kasanič (born 2 March 1976) is a Slovak pro boxer.

He won the Slovakian International Cruiserweight Title in 2007 after defeating Florin Chidici by TKO in the second round. He successfully defended the title in the same year against countryman Pavol Polakovic.

Also in 2007 Kasanic obtained the International Boxing Council Inter-Continental cruiserweight title after defeating Hungarian cruiserweight Oliver Rubin.

In 2008 he boxed Marco Huck for the vacant IBF Inter-Continental cruiserweight title but lost by TKO in the 9th round.
