= Brekov Castle =

Castle ruins in Slovakia

- Brekovský hrad (in Slovak)
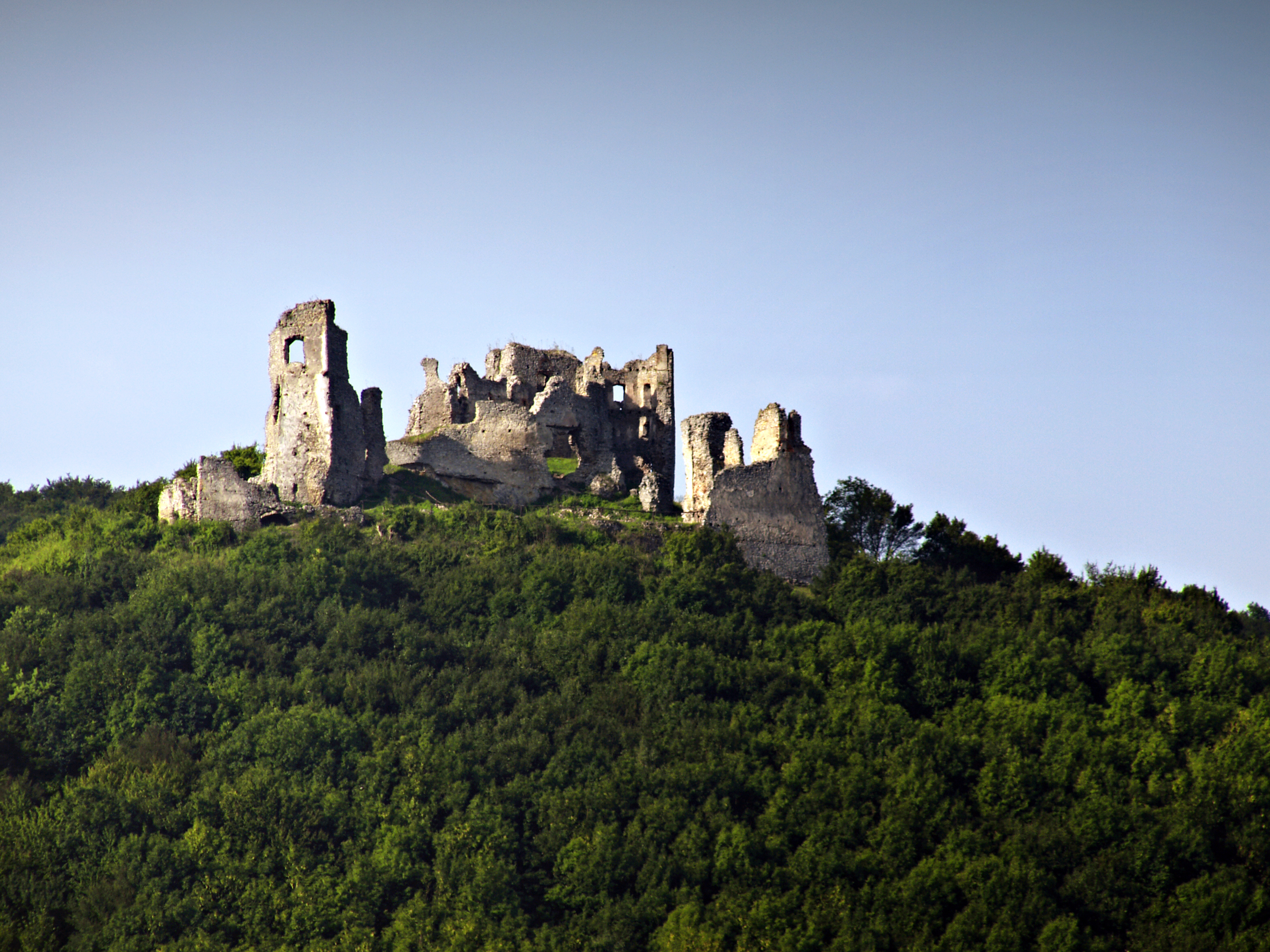
- Interactive map of the Brekov Castle area
- Alternative names: Hrad Brekov, Barkó (vára), castrum Barko/Borko

General information
- Type: Ruined castle, Hilltop castle, Royal toll castle
- Location: Brekov, Slovakia
- Coordinates: 48.902222°N 21.832222°E
- Elevation: ca 280 m (918 ft) ASL
- Construction started: Late 13th century
- Owner: Municipality of Brekov (legal owner); Združenie na záchranu Brekovského hradu (caretaker association)

Brekov Castle (Slovak Hrad Brekov or Brekovský hrad, Hungarian Barkó vára) is a ruined Gothic and Renaissance era stone castle above the village of Brekov in Humenné District, Prešov Region, in east Slovakia. It is a hilltop castle located on a cone-shaped hill with a limestone bedrock, in an altitude of approximately 280 m (918 ft) above sea level. The eponymous village at the foot of the castle hill was founded as an adjoined castle settlement, similarly to several other villages in the region. Brekov and Brekov Castle lie in the traditional region of Zemplín. The castle is listed in the National Cultural Heritage list of the Monuments Board of the Slovak Republic.

== History ==
The castle hill saw human settlement and fortification efforts even before the construction of the medieval castle. Recovered evidence from earlier archaeological research on the hill top and its perimeter revealed the existence of a smaller hill fort of local Slavic tribes during the early Middle Ages.

The beginnings of the stone castle date back to the second half of the 13th century.

== Conservation works ==
Though there were occasional small-scale efforts at conserving certain parts of the castle's masonry during the 20th century, Brekov had mostly been untouched by conservation efforts since it became a ruin in the 17th century (much like other ruined or smaller castles in Slovakia). A concerted and systematic effort at new archaeological research and ruin conservation works on the castle was launched only recently, in the second half of the 2000s. The castle is currently administered by the local historical association Združenie na záchranu Brekovského hradu (ZNZBH, "Association for the Salvaging of Brekov Castle"), crewed with professional archaeologists, historians, architects and masonry experts, as well as local and regional volunteers. The administration, research and conservation works of the association are conducted in official cooperation with the Brekov municipality and the regional branch of the Monuments Board of the Slovak Republic. Research and conservation efforts have been ongoing since 2007 and have focused on clearing the castle hill of excess vegetation, archaeological research, masonry conservation of the northern walls and former courtyard gate of the Upper Castle and masonry conservation on the 16th century entrance gate of the Lower Castle.

== Gallery ==
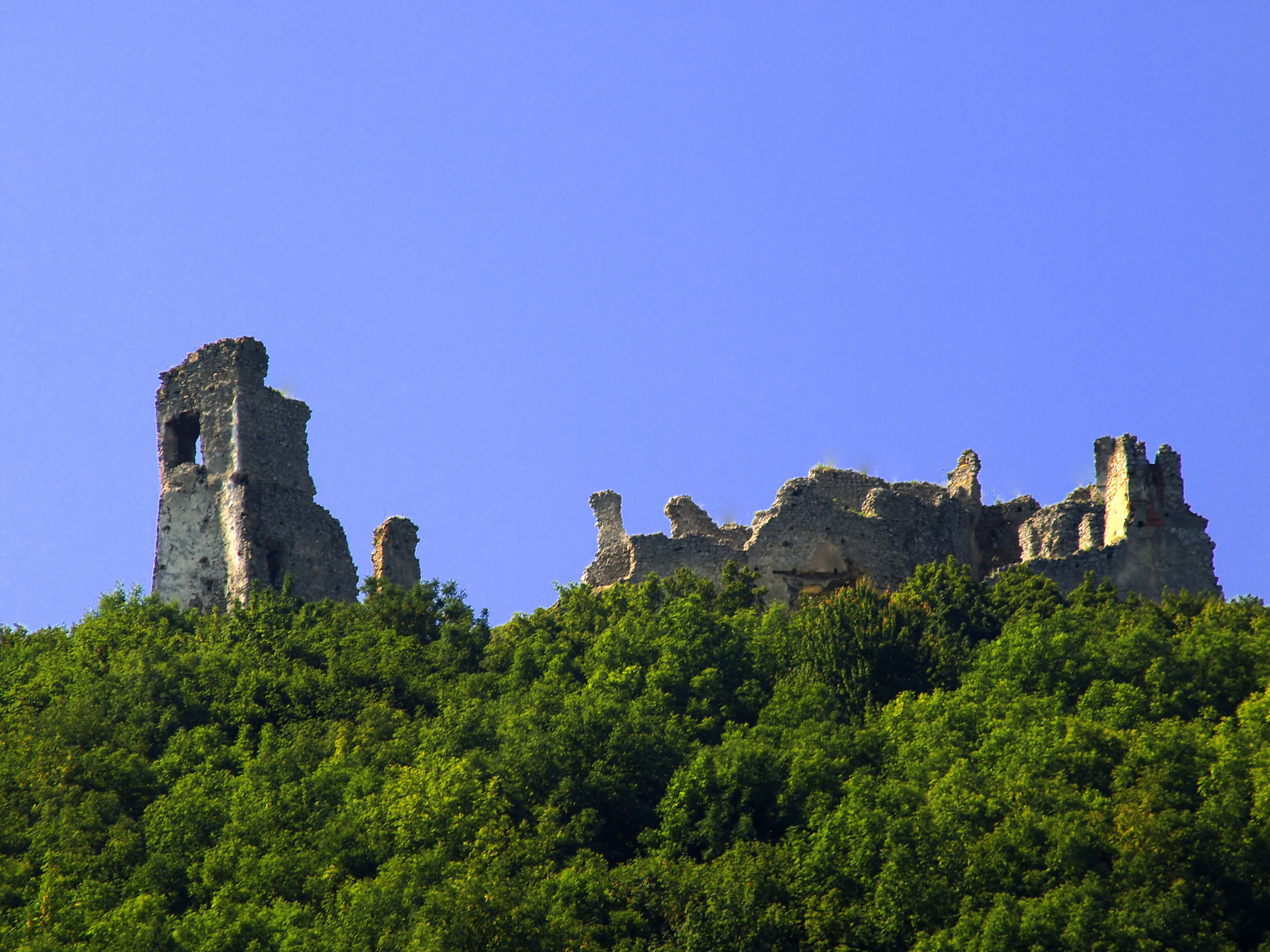
Close up of Brekov Castle from the north (August 2008)

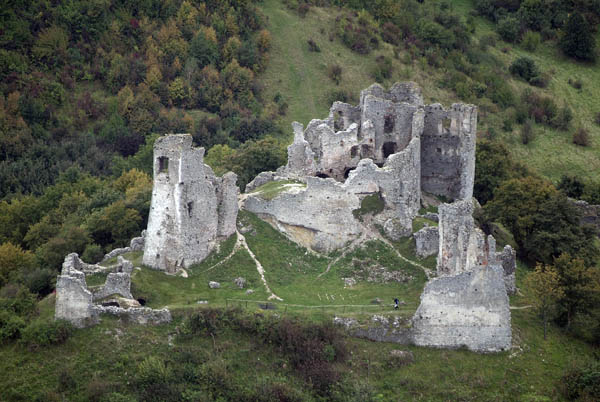
Aerial view of the castle from the northern side (September 2008)

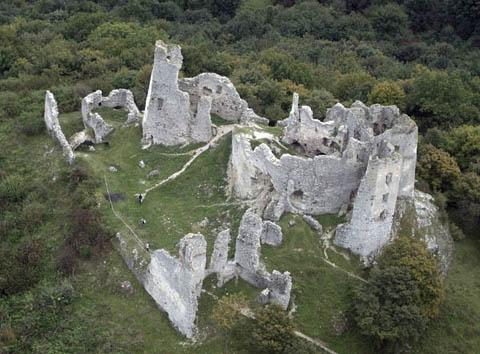
Aerial view of the castle from the western side (September 2008)

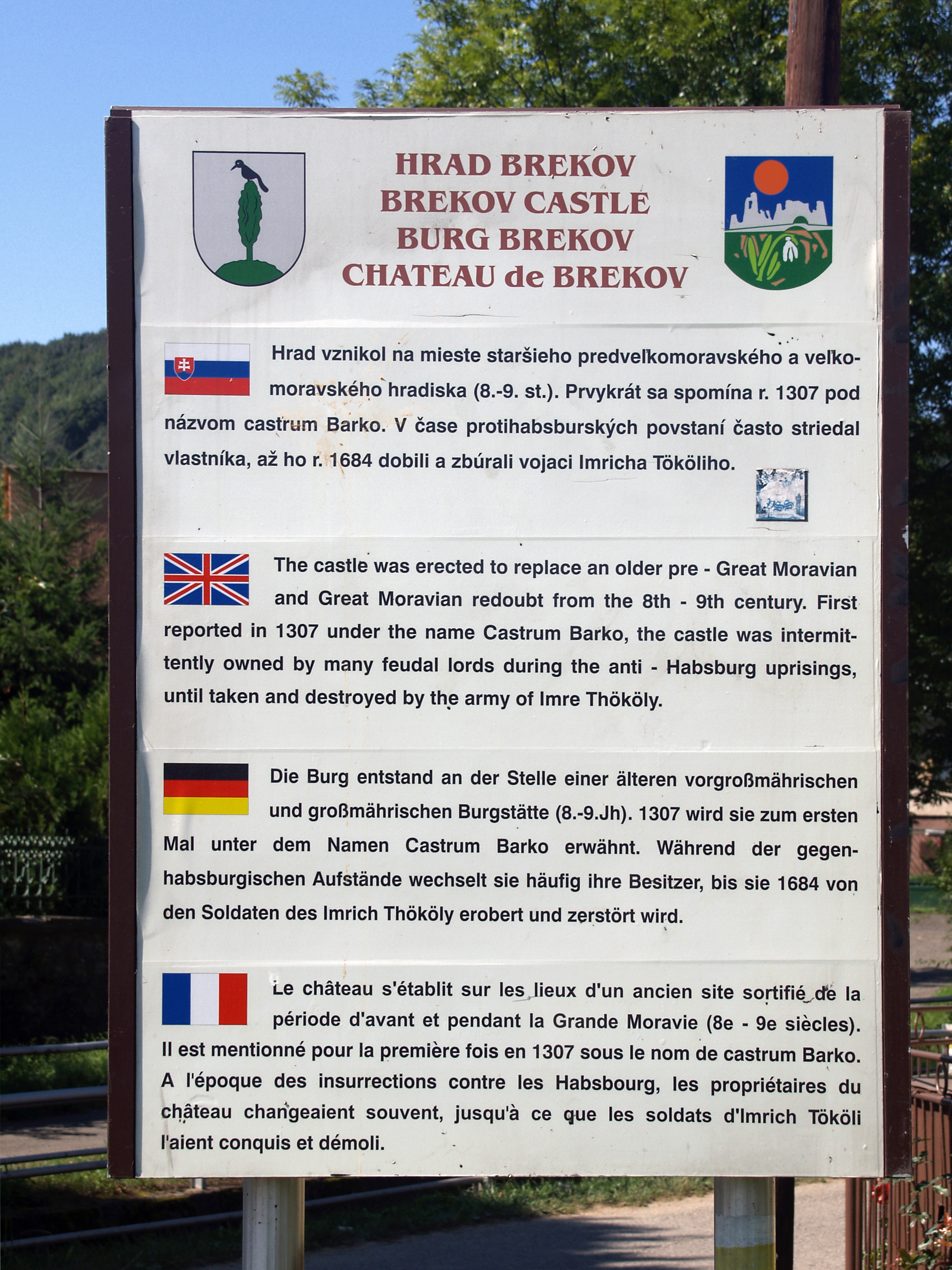
Sign with information on the castle in Slovak, German, English and French (August 2008)

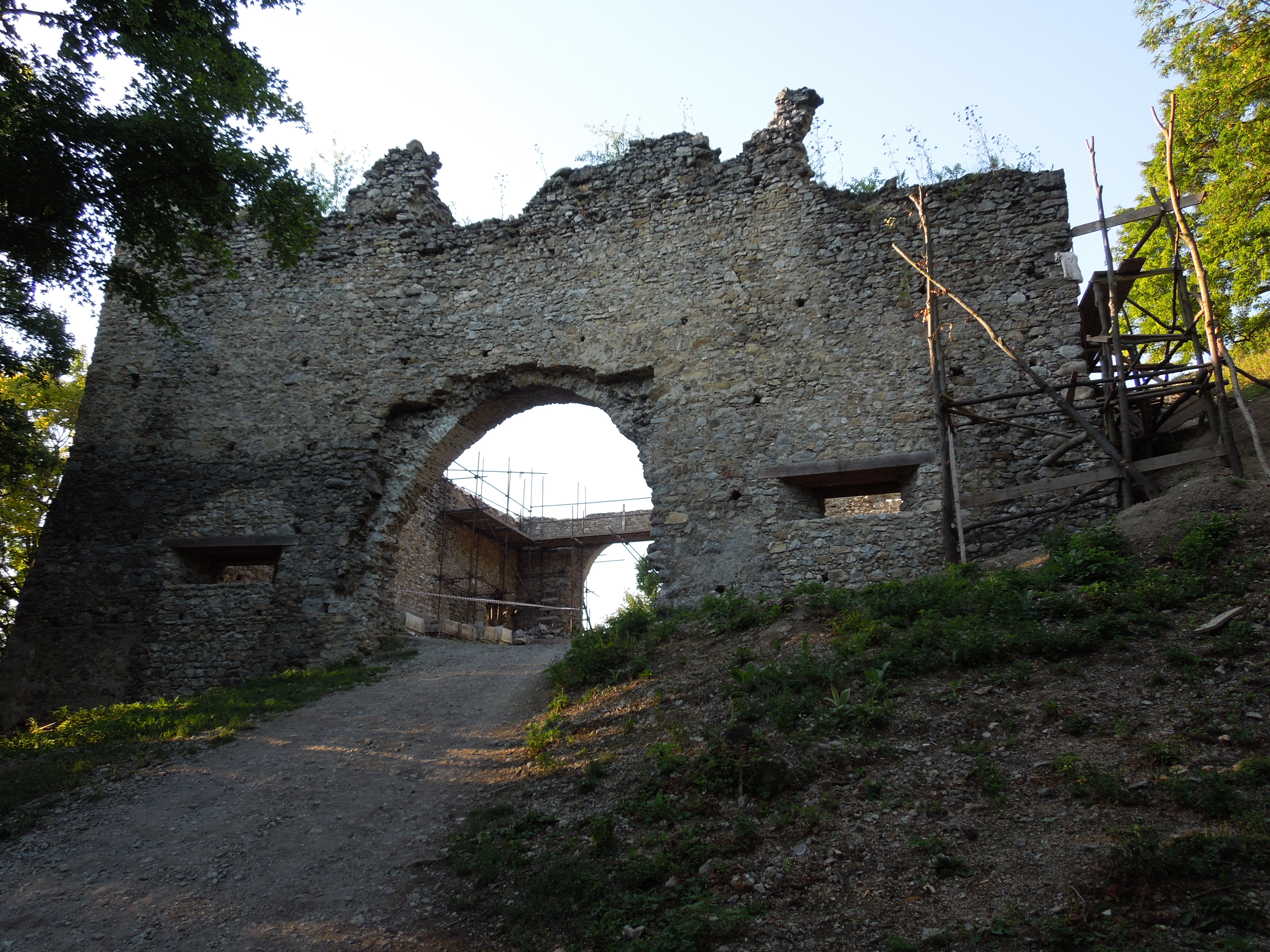
The lower gatehouse (16th century) undergoing preservation works (July 2015)

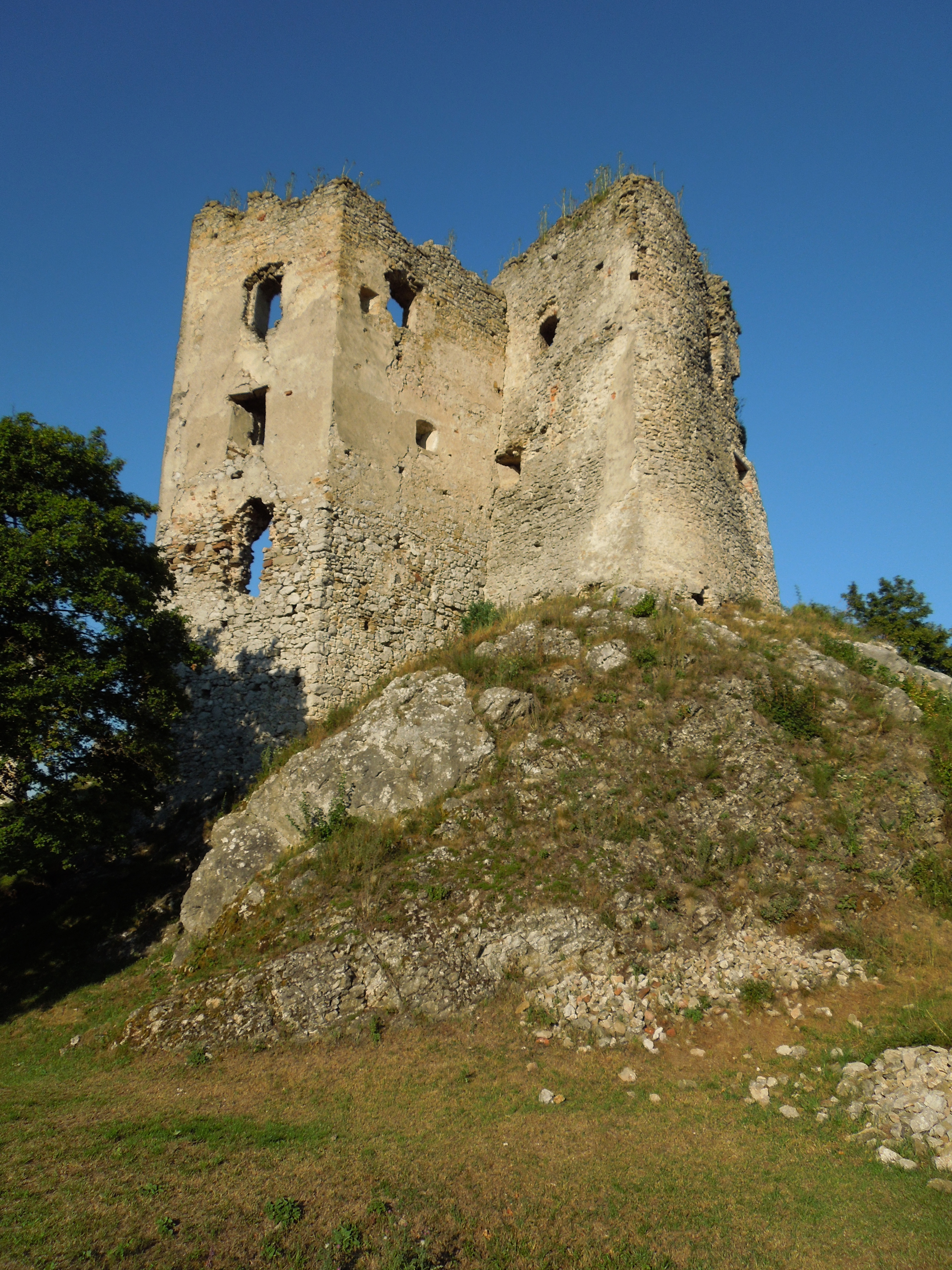
A view of the keep from the lower courtyard, with visibly protruding late 15th century annexe (July 2015)

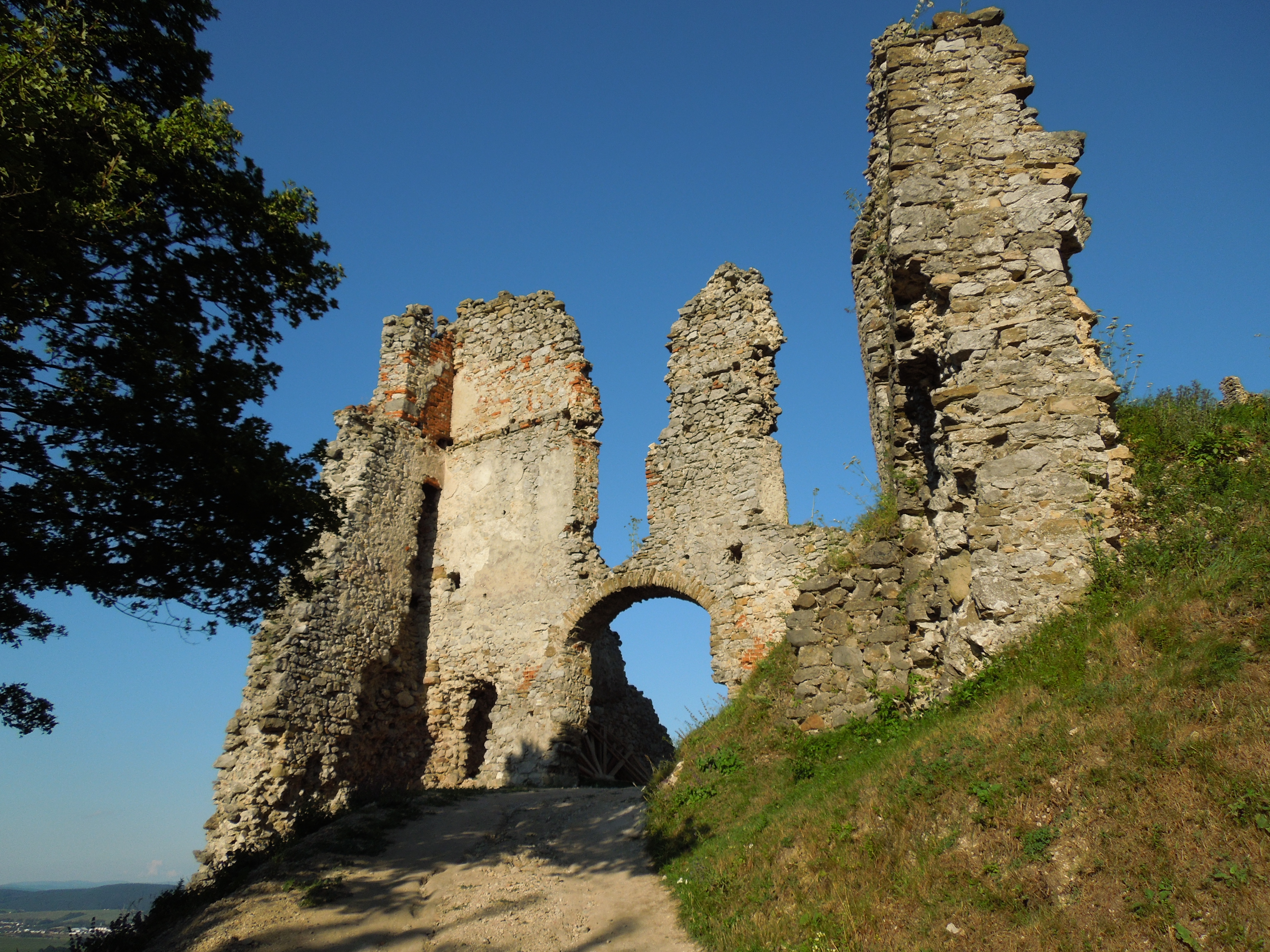
The upper gatehouse, built in the 14th century (July 2015)

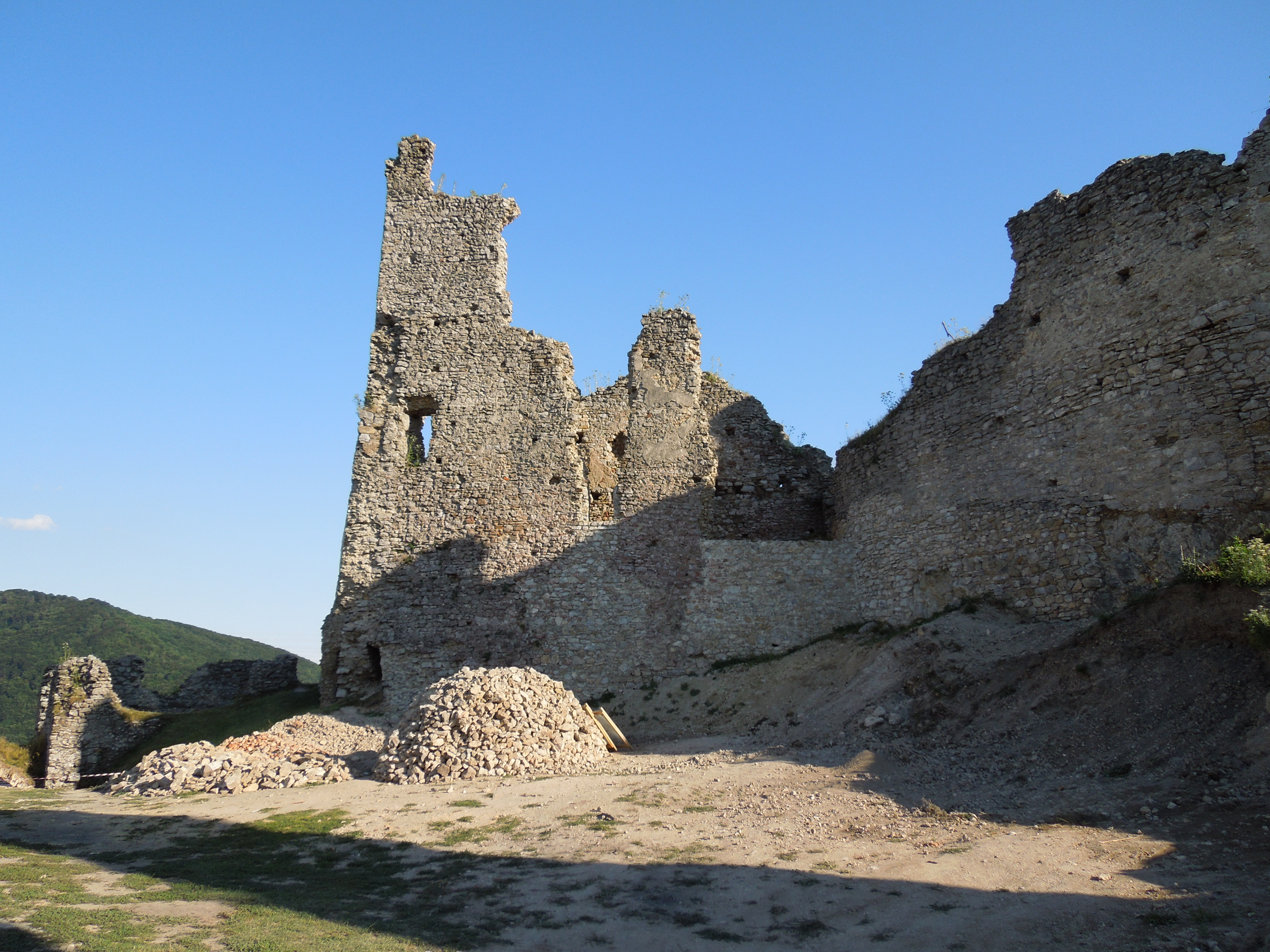
The central courtyard, with the 14th century eastern wing/annexe of the keep undergoing preservation works (July 2015)

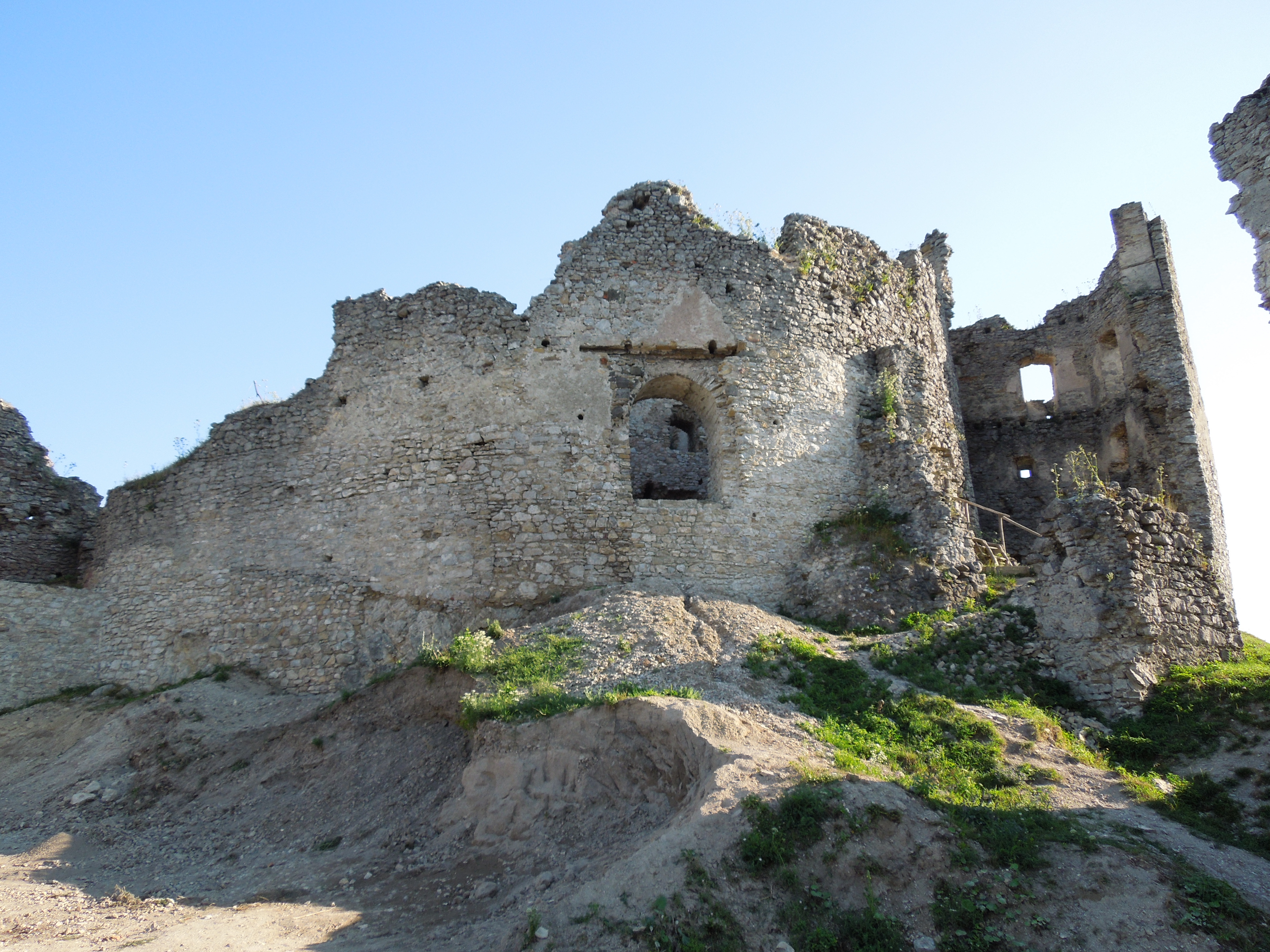
The keep (left and center) and late 15th century annexe (right) undergoing preservation works (July 2015)

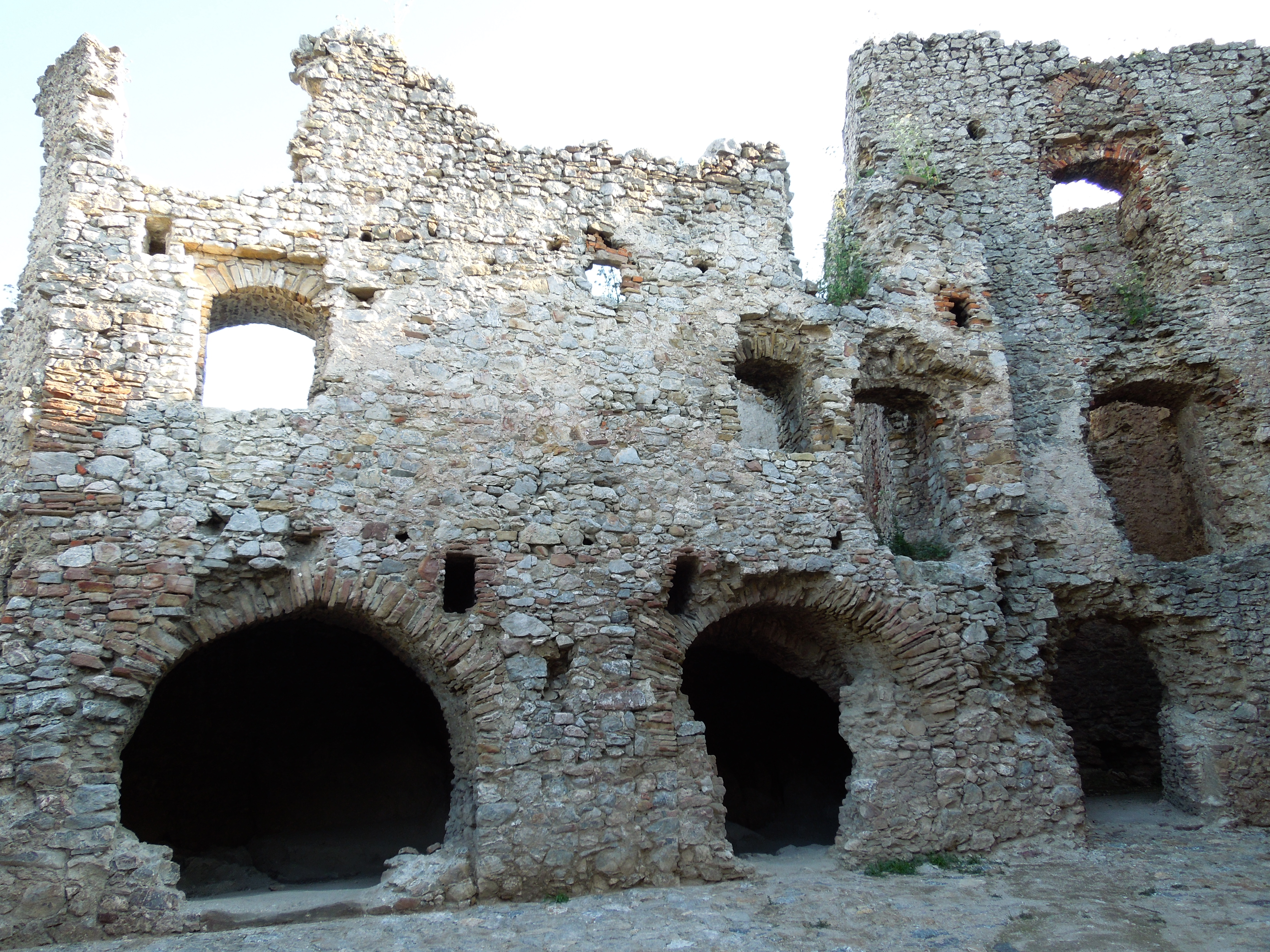
Inner facade of the ruined keep, as seen from the upper, innermost courtyard (July 2015)

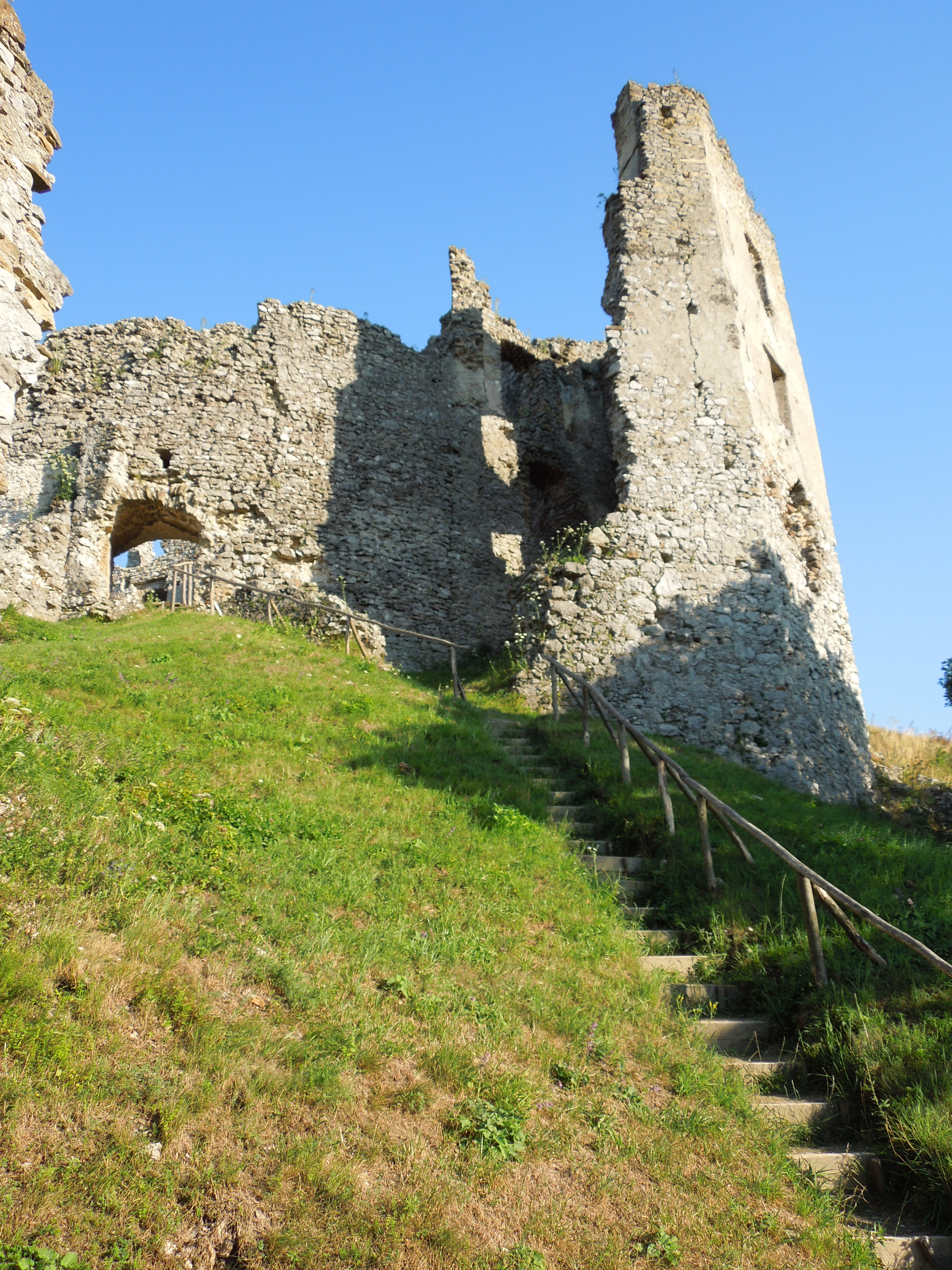
Wooden access stairs for tourists, leading into the ruins of the late 15th century annexe and the keep (July 2015)

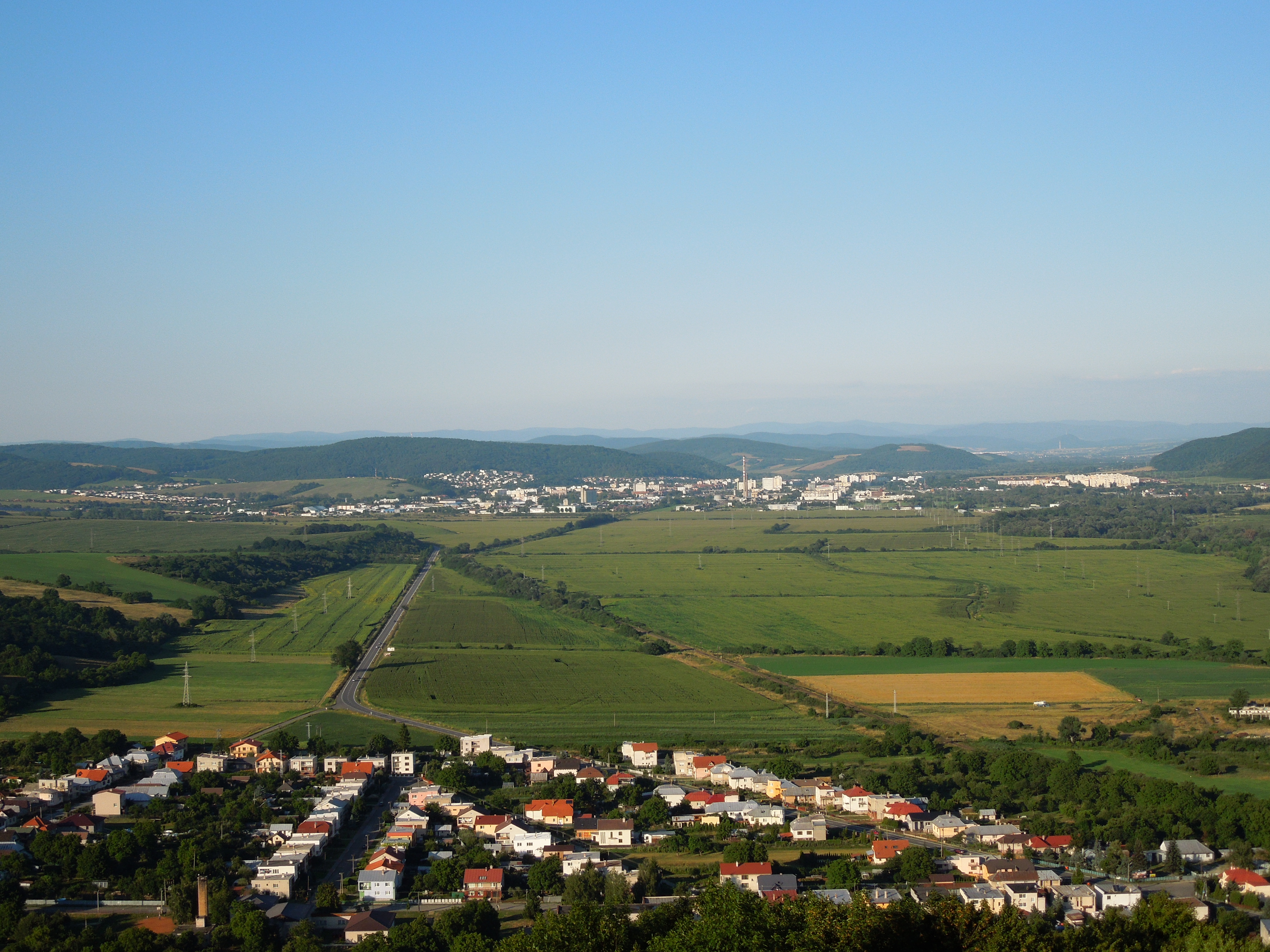
A view of the village of Brekov and the town of Humenné from the castle's central courtyard (July 2015)

== See also ==
- List of castles in Slovakia
- Jasenov Castle - A nearby sister castle, part of the historical Humenné Manor of the Drugeth family, along with Brekov Castle.
