= Yuri Dojc =

Slovak-Canadian fine arts photographer

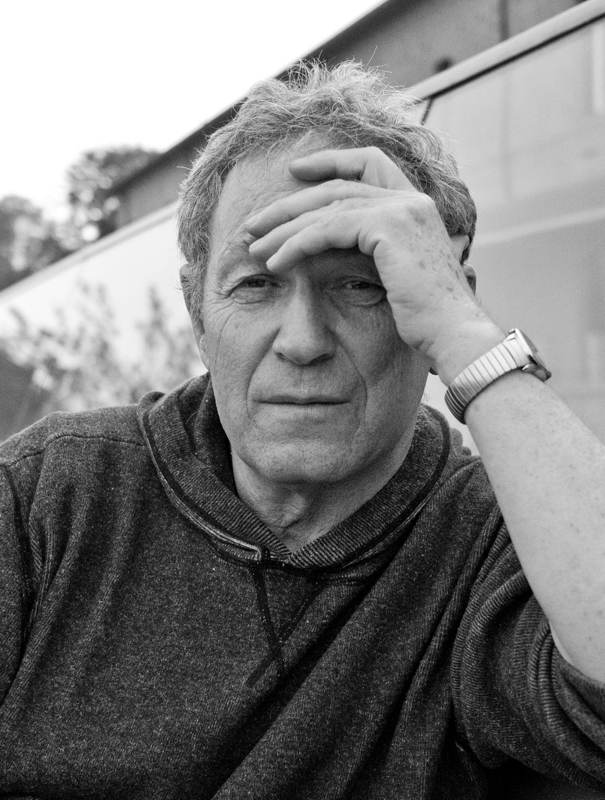
- Born: May 12, 1946 (age 80); Humenné, Czechoslovakia
- Education: Ryerson University, Toronto
- Occupation: Photographer
- Notable work: Last Folio, Marble Woman
- Website: www.yuridojc.com

Yuri Dojc (/doy-dge; born May 12, 1946) is a Slovak-Canadian fine arts photographer. Dojc currently resides in Toronto, Canada, with work internationally exhibited in countries such as Brazil, Slovakia, Rwanda as well as across Canada.

== Life and education ==
Dojc was born in Humenné, Czechoslovakia (now eastern Slovakia) and spent much of his youth there. His father was a secondary school headmaster, and his mother was a teacher. His family later relocated to Bratislava where Dojc studied mechanical engineering and psychology at Comenius University. In 1968, during a summer exchange program in London, United Kingdom, the Warsaw Pact Invasion of Czechoslovakia swept his hometown and forced Dojc to remain in the UK. On advice from his father, he relocated to Toronto, Canada the following year.

He was admitted to Ryerson Polytechnical Institute in 1972, following a serendipitous conversation with the dean at the time. After running into each other on campus, he noticed Dojc's Slovakian accent and took an interest in his background, and subsequently invited him to attend Ryerson as a photography student in Ryerson's Photographic Arts Department.

Before graduating in 1975, Dojc became the photo editor of the student weekly EyeOpener, working alongside Christie Blatchford, later of the National Post, CTV reporter Paul Workman, as well as comedian Paul Chato.

Dojc now calls Toronto his hometown, where he married his current wife, Eva, in 1971. Together they have two children.

== Early career (1975–2000) ==
Dojc's first two years in Toronto were spent doing odd jobs before landing an assistant job with Peter Croydon, a British commercial photographer, who was active in Toronto's advertising scene in the 1970s. Dojc spent only two weeks with him, as he found himself wearied by the commercial nature of the work despite enjoying Croydon's photographs. Dojc moved on into being an on-staff photographer at an audiovisual company, Avcov, now dissolved, before moving on to freelance work and ultimately beginning his career as a full-time independent photographer.

During and after his schooling, Dojc's early photographs followed the classic approaches of photography. He explored still life photography, photographing popular subjects such as doors, windows, chairs and flowers before shifting towards human subjects, predominantly women. The 1980s saw the height of the poster business, during which Dojc flourished, experimenting with surrealism in photographs thanks to the introduction of programs such as Adobe Photoshop, allowing him to explore digital collaging techniques. Posters such as Legs, Bicycle and Chair were some of Dojc's most notable works. His photographs also appeared in Joel Schumacher's film, D.C. Cab (1983), as well as in commercial advertisements for companies such as FedEx, Apple, GM, Porsche, Canon, Club Med, and Panasonic, to name a few.

== Nudes (ongoing) ==
Man Ray was one of Dojc's primary inspirations when approaching his nude studies. Dojc's nude studies were on the classical side, with experimental elements of surrealism and collage. Parallel to advertising work during university, Dojc worked towards creating his first collection of nudes that would eventually become his first published book, Marble Woman. Marble Woman was published by Firefly Books in 1993.

More recently, Dojc has been experimenting with more gritty, experimental approaches to nude photography, focusing more on character than beauty.

== Last Folio (1997–2016) ==
Last Folio was an expansive project that preserved the cultural memory of the Holocaust in Slovakia. It began when Dojc photographed World War II Slovakian war veterans, photographing nearly 30 portraits and collecting 80 textbooks out of a vast collection found at a local abandoned school.

The project started thanks to a chance encounter at Dojc's father's funeral, when Ruzena Vajnorska, a friend of the family and survivor of the holocaust, needed a lift from the funeral. During their encounter, Vajnorska shared her history with Dojc, inspiring intrigue into the history of the Holocaust in Slovakia. With the help of Vajnorska, veterans from the community congregated to be photographed by Dojc, thus starting the collection of portraits for "Last Folio".

This project was under the watch of Martin Butora, the then ambassador of the Slovak Embassy in Washington, D.C., later to become the human rights advisor to the Slovakian president. As the project expanded, growing in photographs and involvement from the Slovak community, it gained sponsorship from the Slovak government, as well as Bertelsmann, thanks to the special interest of then president, Thomas Rabe.

In 2005, Last Folio expanded from an image based project to include a short documentary film as well. When Dojc met Katya Krausova, a Slovak producer and filmmaker, they formed a partnership and produced a 20-minute documentary about the project. Dojc and Krausova worked tirelessly with a film crew, filming in the small town of Bardejov.

A year later, while Dojc continued photographing Slovakian veterans, word travelled, reaching a man who was a caretaker of an abandoned school. He urged Dojc to visit the space and explore its preserved history. There, Dojc discovered the petrified religious books left behind by the students before WWII, thus widening the scope of the project to include a preservation of not only personal but cultural history as well. From then on, detailed photographs of these preserved texts became a permanent part of the Last Folio collection.

== North Is Freedom (2016-ongoing) ==
North Is Freedom is a photographic essay that includes portraits of descendants of slaves who escaped to Canada from the United States before the American Civil War using the Underground Railroad.

Dojc began photographing descendants in Toronto before traveling over southern Ontario, including Windsor and Amhersburg, and expanding the project further to include Halifax and Owen Sound. Dojc was able to photograph over 50 people, enough to qualify North Is Freedom for an exhibition.

North Is Freedom's first exhibition was held in 2016 at the Canadian Embassy in Washington D.C. with sponsorship of TD Bank, Epson Canada, as well as the Government of Canada. The show remained there before moving to the American Embassy in Ottawa, ON and then the Grey Roots Museum in 2017. Dojc was also invited to Uncle Tom's Cabin site in Dresden, ON to lecture on the project.
