= Brekov =

- Municipality
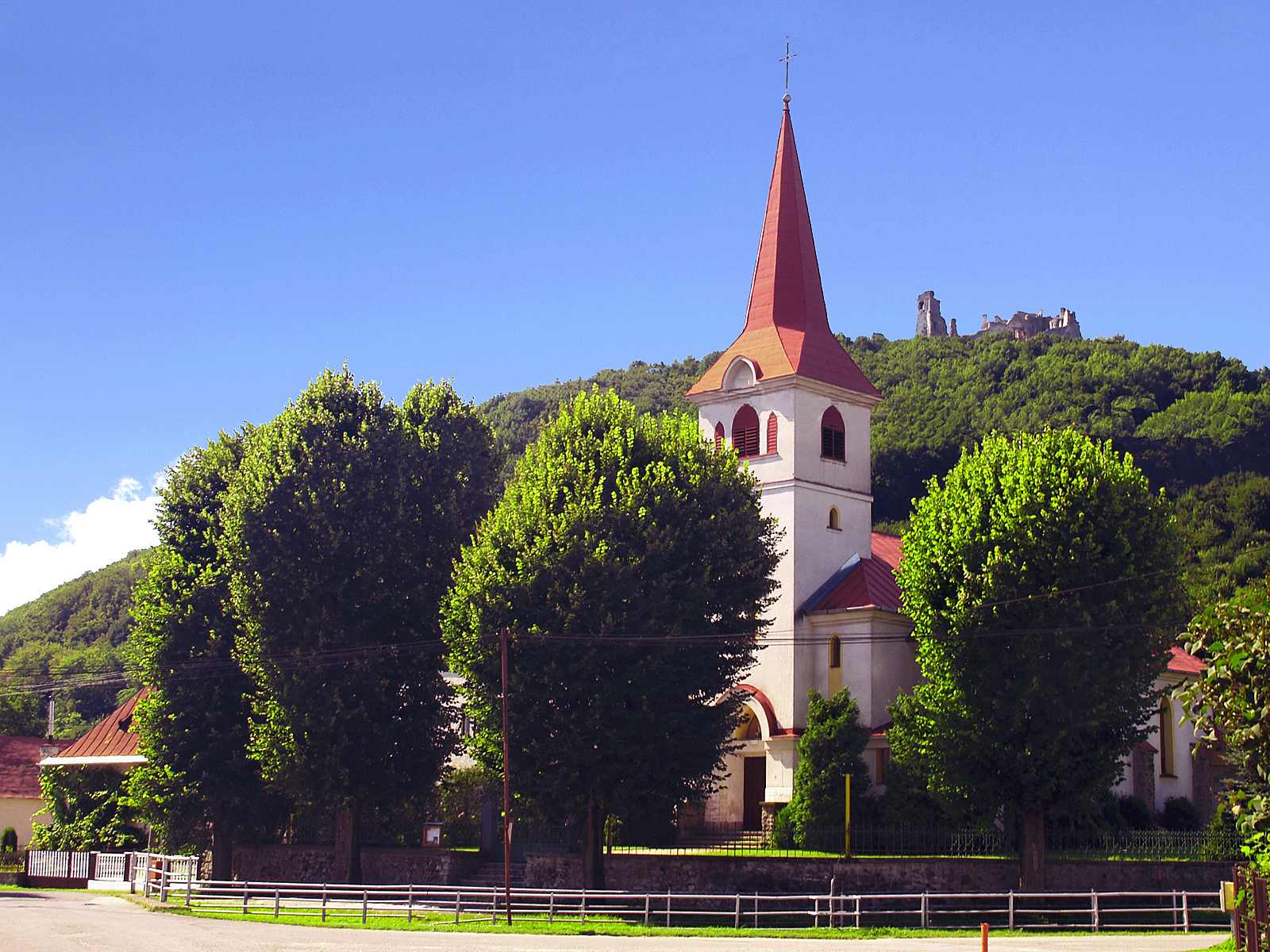
- Brekov Castle viewed from the village church

- Flag

- Location of Brekov in the Prešov Region Location of Brekov in Slovakia
- Coordinates: 48.90°N 21.83°E
- Country: Slovakia
- Region: Prešov Region
- District: Humenné District
- First mentioned: 1314

Area
  - Total: 9.72 km^{2} (3.75 sq mi)
- Elevation: 140 m (460 ft)

Population (2025)
  - Total: 1,290
- Time zone: UTC+1 (CET)
  - Summer (DST): UTC+2 (CEST)
- Postal code: 660 1
- Area code: +421 57
- Vehicle registration plate (until 2022): HE
- Website: www.brekov.sk

Brekov (Hungarian: Barkó) is a village and municipality in the Humenné District in the Prešov Region of north-east Slovakia.

== History ==
In historical records the village was first mentioned in 1314.

== Geography ==
The municipality lies at an altitude of 140 metres (460 ft) and covers an area of 9.72 km^{2} (3.75 sq mi) (2025).

== Population ==
Population statistic (10 years)
Year	1995	2005	2015	2025
Count	1239	1267	1348	1290
Difference		+2.25%	+6.39%	−4.30%

Population statistic
Year	2024	2025
Count	1308	1290
Difference		−1.37%

It has a population of 1290 people (31 December 2025).

=== Ethnicity ===
Census 2021 (1+ %)
Ethnicity	Number	Fraction
Slovak	1306	98.04%
Not found out	23	1.72%
Rusyn	14	1.05%
Total	1332	

In year 2021 was 1332 people by ethnicity 1306 as Slovak, 23 as Not found out, 14 as Rusyn, 9 as Romani, 8 as Other, 7 as Czech, 4 as Hungarian, 3 as Russian, 3 as English, 2 as Italian, 1 as Vietnamese and 1 as Ukrainian.

Note on population: The difference values of population numbers in the table "Population statistic" and in the sections "Ethnicity" & "Religion" is caused by the use of various statistical methods.

=== Religion ===
Census 2021 (1+ %)
Religion	Number	Fraction
Roman Catholic Church	1166	87.54%
None	78	5.86%
Greek Catholic Church	43	3.23%
Not found out	18	1.35%
Total	1332	

In year 2021 was 1332 people by religion 1166 from Roman Catholic Church, 78 from None, 43 from Greek Catholic Church, 18 from Not found out, 10 from Eastern Orthodox Church, 6 from Evangelical Church, 5 from Other, 4 from Ad hoc movements, 1 from Calvinist Church and 1 from United Methodist Church.

== Landmarks ==
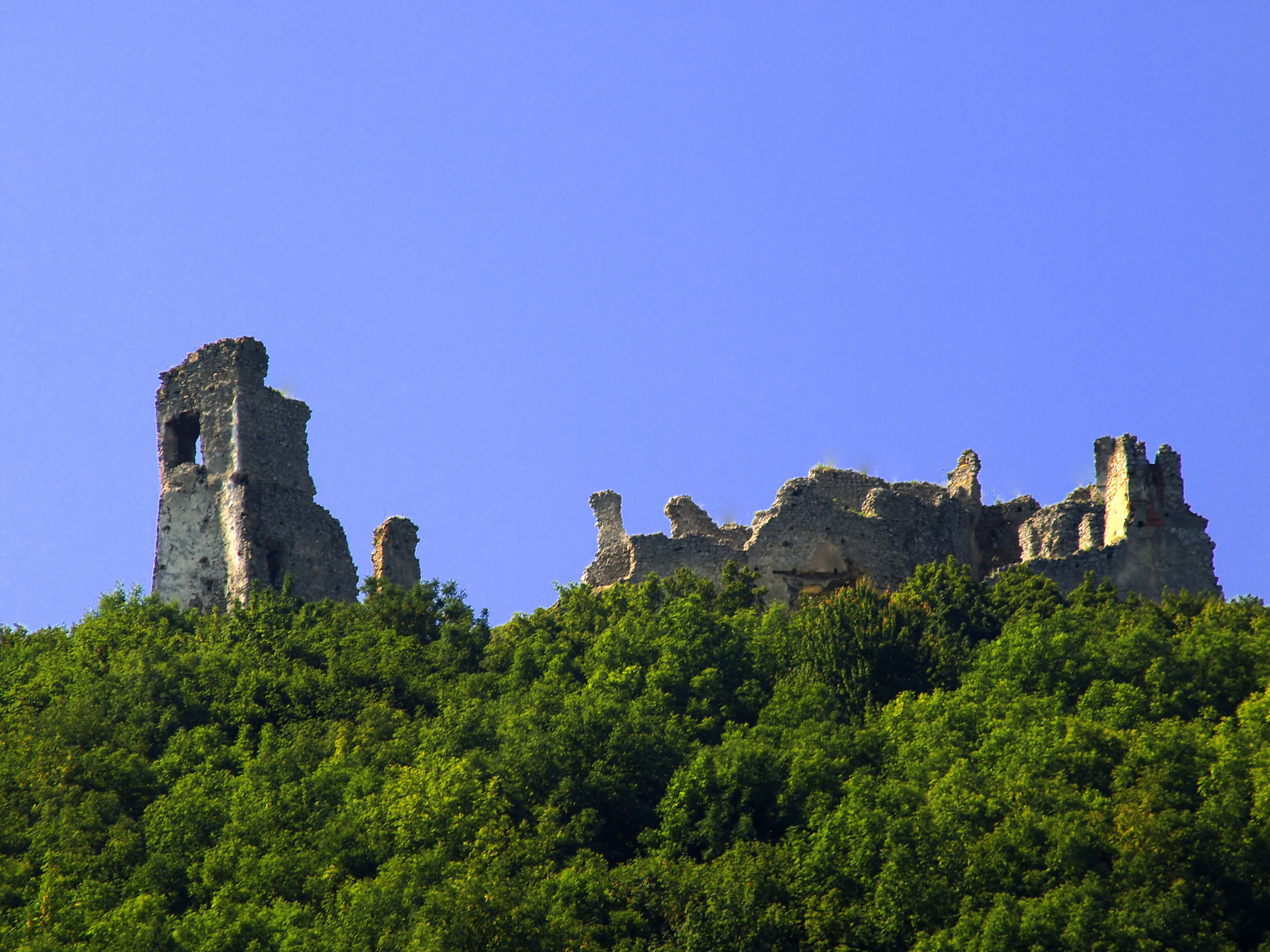
Ruins of Brekov Castle

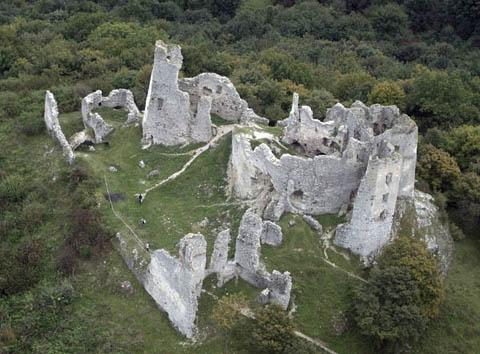
Ruins of Brekov Castle from a bird's eye view

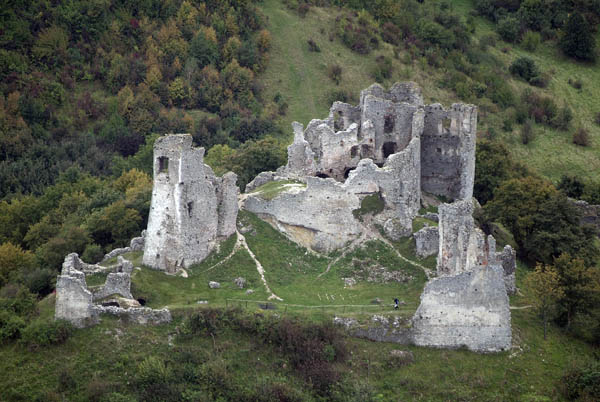
Ruins of Brekov Castle from a bird's eye view

Situated on a limestone bedrock hill at an altitude of roughly 480 m above sea level, Brekov castle was founded in the late second half of the 13th century. It went through various owners during its history, though the longest ownership was by the Drugeth noble family, residing in nearby Humenné. The castle was damaged in the 1640s and despite some repairs, it was abandoned and fell into ruin after 1684.

== Genealogical resources ==
The records for genealogical research are available at the state archive "Statny Archiv in Presov, Slovakia"

- Roman Catholic church records (births/marriages/deaths): 1713-1940 (parish B)

== See also ==
- List of municipalities and towns in Slovakia
