= Jasenov, Humenné District =

Jasenov
- Municipality
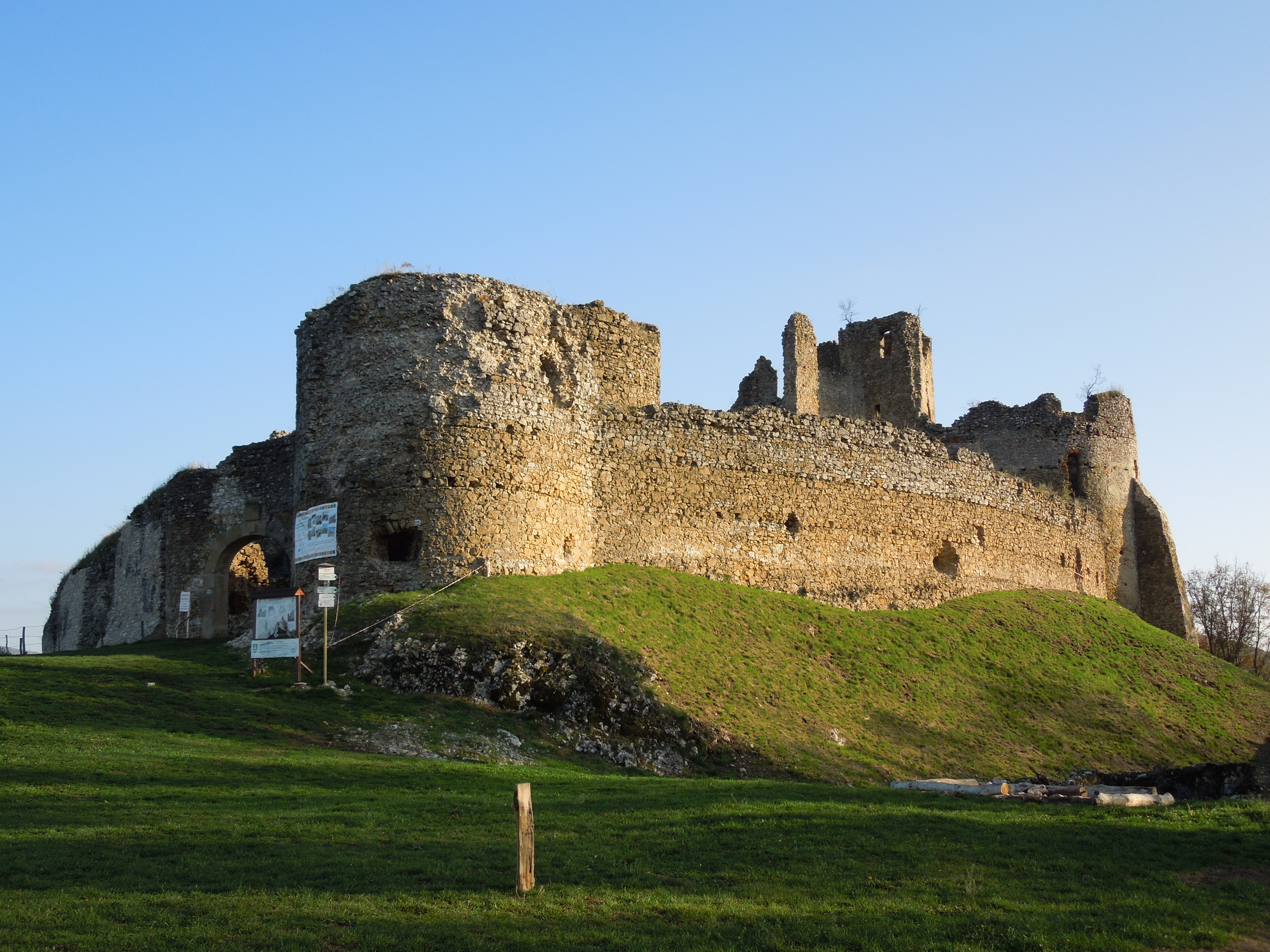
- Jasenov Castle

- Flag

- Location of Jasenov in the Prešov Region Location of Jasenov in Slovakia
- Coordinates: 48.91°N 21.90°E
- Country: Slovakia
- Region: Prešov Region
- District: Humenné District
- First mentioned: 1279

Area
  - Total: 12.89 km^{2} (4.98 sq mi)
- Elevation: 157 m (515 ft)

Population (2025)
  - Total: 1,243
- Time zone: UTC+1 (CET)
  - Summer (DST): UTC+2 (CEST)
- Postal code: 660 1
- Area code: +421 57
- Vehicle registration plate (until 2022): HE
- Website: www.jasenov.sk

Jasenov is a village and municipality in Humenné District in the Prešov Region of north-east Slovakia.

== History ==
In historical records the village was first mentioned in 1279. Jasenov has a castle that dates from the mid-14th century, when it was owned by Phillip Drugeth. It was later destroyed in 1644.

== Geography ==
The municipality lies at an altitude of 157 metres (515 ft) and covers an area of 12.89 km^{2} (4.98 sq mi) (2025).

== Population ==
Population statistic (10 years)
Year	1995	2005	2015	2025
Count	1099	1157	1189	1243
Difference		+5.27%	+2.76%	+4.54%

Population statistic
Year	2024	2025
Count	1210	1243
Difference		+2.72%

It has a population of 1243 people (31 December 2025).

=== Ethnicity ===
Census 2021 (1+ %)
Ethnicity	Number	Fraction
Slovak	1158	98.21%
Rusyn	45	3.81%
Total	1179	

In year 2021 was 1179 people by ethnicity 1158 as Slovak, 45 as Rusyn, 11 as Not found out, 7 as Czech, 7 as Ukrainian, 5 as Russian, 3 as Other and 2 as Italian.

Note on population: The difference values of population numbers in the table "Population statistic" and in the sections "Ethnicity" & "Religion" is caused by the use of various statistical methods.

=== Religion ===
Census 2021 (1+ %)
Religion	Number	Fraction
Roman Catholic Church	975	82.7%
Greek Catholic Church	86	7.29%
None	75	6.36%
Eastern Orthodox Church	23	1.95%
Total	1179	

In year 2021 was 1179 people by religion 975 from Roman Catholic Church, 86 from Greek Catholic Church, 75 from None, 23 from Eastern Orthodox Church, 6 from Ad hoc movements, 4 from Not found out, 3 from Evangelical Church, 2 from Calvinist Church, 2 from Other and not ascertained christian church, 1 from Other, 1 from United Methodist Church and 1 from Church of the Brethren.

== Genealogical resources ==
The records for genealogical research are available at the state archive "Statny Archiv in Presov, Slovakia"

- Roman Catholic church records (births/marriages/deaths): 1802-1911 (parish B)
- Greek Catholic church records (births/marriages/deaths): 1768-1946 (parish B)

== See also ==
- List of municipalities and towns in Slovakia
