= John I Drugeth =

Neapolitan–Hungarian baron

John (I) Drugeth
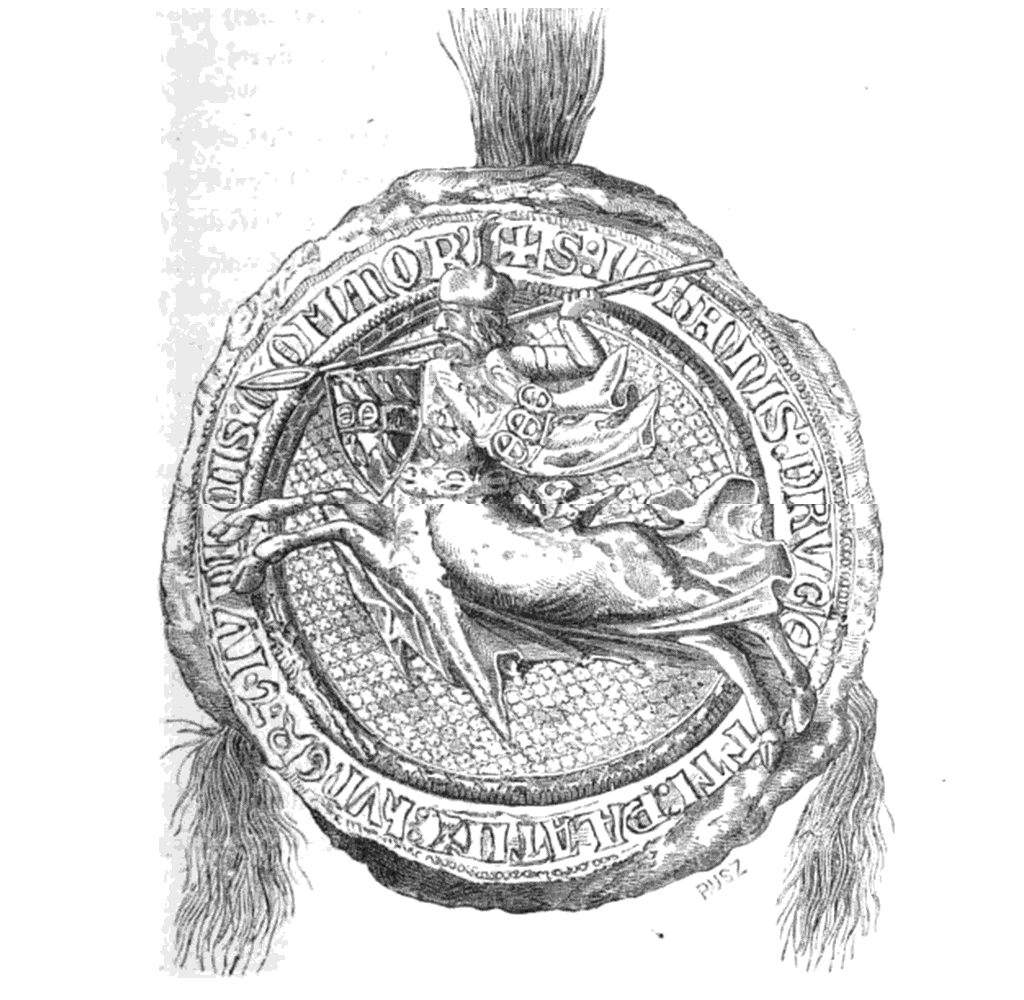
- Seal of John Drugeth (1332)

Palatine of Hungary
- Reign: 1328–1333 (or 1334)
- Predecessor: Philip Drugeth
- Successor: William Drugeth
- Born: c. 1286
- Died: April/May 1334; Kingdom of Naples (?)
- Noble family: House of Drugeth
- Spouse: Pasqua de Bononensi
- Issue: William; Nicholas I Philip II; John II; Clementia
- Father: Johannes de Trogect
- Mother: Isabella N

John (I) Drugeth (also Druget, Hungarian: Druget (I.) János, Old French: Jehan Druget, Slovak: Ján I. Druget, Ukrainian: Янош Другет; c. 1286 – April or May 1334) was an influential Neapolitan–Hungarian baron, an early member of the powerful Drugeth family. He was a confidant of the Capetian House of Anjou since his childhood. While his younger brother Philip escorted his lord, the young pretender Charles of Anjou to the Kingdom of Hungary, John entered the service of Clementia, Queen consort of France and Navarre.

Following the death of Philip in 1327, King Charles I invited John to Hungary in order to succeed his brother, who died without a male heir, as Palatine, while John's eldest son William inherited his uncle's large-scale province in the northeastern part of the realm. Through his two younger sons, John was forefather of the Hungarian branch of the Drugeth family, which flourished until the 17th century.

== Family ==
John Drugeth was born into a Neapolitan noble family, which originated from the Kingdom of France. They belonged to those Italian elite of Ultramontane (French or Provençal) origin, who arrived to Apulia (Southern Italy) with Charles I of Anjou, who conquered the Kingdom of Sicily in 1266. John was the elder son of John Drugeth, Sr. (Latin: Johannes de Trogect), a royal valet in the court of Charles II of Naples, and a certain Isabella from an unidentified family. He was born around 1286. His younger brother Philip was a trained knight. They also had a sister Matilda. They were all still minors at the turn of the 13th and 14th centuries, because their names appeared in diminutive forms in a single document around 1300 ("Joannoctus, Filippoctus et Matchtilda Drugetii").

Both parents died by the middle of the 1290s. Their uncle (or grandfather?), Nicholas and his wife Isabella de La Forêt adopted and took over the care of the children, who became their immediate heirs too. Nicholas served as Lord Steward for Charles Martel's wife Clementia from 1292 to 1295. Both died of the plague in Naples. In 1298, Nicholas was mentioned as tutor of the children of the late Charles Martel – i.e. Charles (the future King of Hungary), Clementia and Beatrice. Consequently, Nicholas' nephews John and Philip were raised together with Charles in the royal court, where they cherished their lifelong friendship and alliance. While John entered the service of Clementia (later Queen consort of France for a short time), the younger brother Philip belonged to the escort of Charles, who was sent to Hungary in order to claim the throne in 1300, and the child Philip escorted him to the kingdom.

== Career in Naples and France ==
Their uncle, Nicholas died prior to 1299. In that year, John was inducted to the inherited fiefdoms in Melito di Napoli and Pascarola near the Angevins' hunting estate, Aversa. After Philip had left for Hungary in the next year, John remained the only Drugeth left in the Kingdom of Naples. Under his patronage, the family chapel on their estate at Pascarola was raised to the rank of a parish church. Following Charles II could not prevent the Aragonese from occupying Calabria and the islands in the Gulf of Naples, John was required to pay subventio generalis in 1300 and 1302. His two fiefdoms near Aversa were relatively insignificant lands, for instance, Melito di Napoli was worth only 30 ounces of gold.

Robert the Wise ascended the Neapolitan throne in 1309. In that year, the new monarch sent John Drugeth to Avignon in order to escort Petrus de Bolonesio, the recently elected Bishop of Aversa, who requested the papal confirmation of his election from Pope Clement V. John was among the many nobles, who were recruited to fight against the Aragonese army in Calabria in 1313.

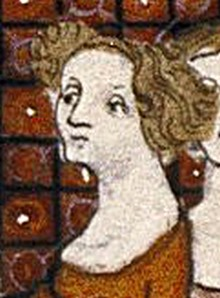
John Drugeth and his family faithfully served Queen Clementia of Hungary until her death in 1328

John Drugeth married noble lady Pasqua de Bononensi (or de Boulonois). They had four sons – William (Willerm), Nicholas I, John II, Philip II – and a daughter, named Clementia, who became a Williamite nun. The entire family entered the service of Clementia, the daughter of the late Charles Martel and niece of Robert, who sent them to France to escort her, where Clementia became the second wife of Louis X of France on 19 August 1315. They became courtiers in the household of the queen at Paris. The marriage of Clementia, however, proved to be short-lived, because Louis X died in June 1316, and his posthumous son John I lived only five days in November 1316. Louis' brother Philip V ascended the French throne thereafter, whose relationship had deteriorated with the widow queen and refused to pay her annual income Louis had promised her. Clementia and her queenly court, including the Drugeths, then left the French court for Aix-en-Provence, where she stayed until 1321, when she returned to Paris.

While his family resided in the politically insignificant former queen's estate, John Drugeth received several orders from his king. In 1316, Robert ordered the vassals of Terra di Lavoro to appear before justiciar Guillelmi di Dinisiaco in order to pay off servitium, and among them was John. From 1317 to 1322, John was in the service of Philip I, Prince of Taranto, King Robert's younger brother. In these years, Robert exempted him from the participation of compulsory warfare against Aragon. John mostly stayed in the Balkan Peninsula, because Philip continued to plot the recovery of the Latin Empire. In July–August 1322, the elderly dowager queen, Mary (widow of Charles II) sent John Drugeth as her envoy to her grandson Charles, the King of Hungary. This gave John a chance to meet his brother Philip Drugeth after more than two decades. John had to experience that Philip became one of the richest and most powerful barons of the Kingdom of Hungary by that time, who also elevated into the dignity of Palatine in the next year. It is plausible that the brothers settled the question of inheritance of Philip's lordship with the approval of their lord Charles, as Philip had no male descendants. He must have also left good impression on the Hungarian monarch, in addition to their common past in childhood.

Thereafter, John returned to Naples. He was again called on to fight in the war against the Kingdom of Aragon, who had seized Sicily from the Angevins, in 1324 by Robert. Regardless of John's other services, his family continued to have an important place in the court of former queen Clementia. Both the names of John and Pasqua (as "Jehan Druget" and "Madamme Pasque") appear frequently in the queen's famous inventory of gift giving. Over the years, John's wife Pasqua became the most prominent member of her household, acting as principal lady-in-waiting. Pasqua's financial award (300 livres) was higher than that of the other courtiers of even her husband's in the court. By 1328, the young William functioned as shield bearer, while Queen Clementia was the godmother of John's younger children, John II and Clementia (who was named after their lady). Philip II, a cleric, was a canon in Arras Cathedral in the same year. On 5 October 1328, Clementia compiled her last will and testament, in which she richly awarded John and his wife by leaving them 800 and 650 livres in Paris, respectively. She died roughly a week later, on 13 October 1328. However, at the time of the drafting of the testament, the Drugeth family were no longer with Clementia in Paris, because John received an invitation and offer resettlement from Clementia's brother Charles to Hungary, which resulted a decisive moment in the family history of the Drugeths.

== Palatine of Hungary ==
Philip Drugeth's health had deteriorated by the middle of 1327. He died either in June or July. Shortly after (or before) his death, his brother John I and his nephews – William, Nicholas I and John II – were invited from Naples to Hungary in order to inherit his wealth and power. William and his wife already resided in Hungary in August 1327, when he inherited his uncle's large-scale province in the northeastern part of the kingdom in accordance with the king's decision. It is also possible that John was also present in the Hungarian court since that year. Based on the future personal staff in his palatinal court, historian Attila Zsoldos considers that John served as ispán of Csongrád County; for instance, a certain Giacomino (Gyekmin or Gekmen), later John's familiaris, acted as vice-ispán of the county in October 1327. Nevertheless, John Drugeth first appeared in Hungarian documents on 21 September 1328, when he was one of the signatories of the Treaty of Bruck, in which Charles I signed a peace treaty with the three dukes of Austria (Frederick the Fair, Albert the Lame, and Otto the Merry). The document refers to his foreign origin with the adjective "the Italian" (Latin: Gallicus) and his social status as "miles" (knight). In his seal, he was styled as "dominus de Pasquerol", referring to his fiefdom in Apulia, which also confirms that he has just arrived to Hungary and he was a member of Charles' entourage, without holding any specific dignities. Consequently, his seal was of private character. Among the twenty-six seals in the 1328 treaty, John's is only one to have been pressed in red wax bearing the impress of a mounted knight. During the Angevin period, only six seals depicted mounted knights were preserved, three of them belonged to the Drugeth family. According to Ágnes Kurcz, this symbol of the chivalric culture was introduced to Hungary of the Angevin era due to the Drugeths.

The position of Palatine remained vacant for more than a year, at least from 11 July 1327 to 17 September 1328. According to Serbian historian Đura Hardi, it took time for John and his family, along with their escort, to come to Hungary from Paris through Avignon and Naples, and Charles patiently waited for their arrival. Attila Zsoldos emphasizes, John Drugeth was tied with many threads to the Kingdom of Naples, primarily with his fiefdoms and the associated responsibilities and services. John had to ask permission from King Robert to suspend his service. On the other hand, John with his political relations and local knowledge in Southern Italy may have proved to be a useful courtier for Charles, who never gave up his claim to the throne of Naples. Seeing the rapid ascension and enrichment of his late brother, John experienced that the Hungarian king generously bestowed his faithful subjects. Shortly after his arrival, John Drugeth was installed as castellan of Óbuda, which was his first office in Hungary. He was appointed as ispán of Ung County on 9 October 1328. John was first mentioned as Palatine of Hungary on 31 October 1328. Nevertheless, a letter of Pope John XXII to lady Pasqua de Bononensi on 4 September 1328 already referred to her as the consort of the Hungarian Palatine, which indicates that the position was prepared for John until his arrival. John was among those appointed noble judges in May 1330, who has ruled over the kindred Záh, which one of notable members, Felician Záh had attempted to assassinate the royal family on 17 April 1330 in Visegrád (his son, Nicholas was one of those courtiers, who defended the lives of the young princes).

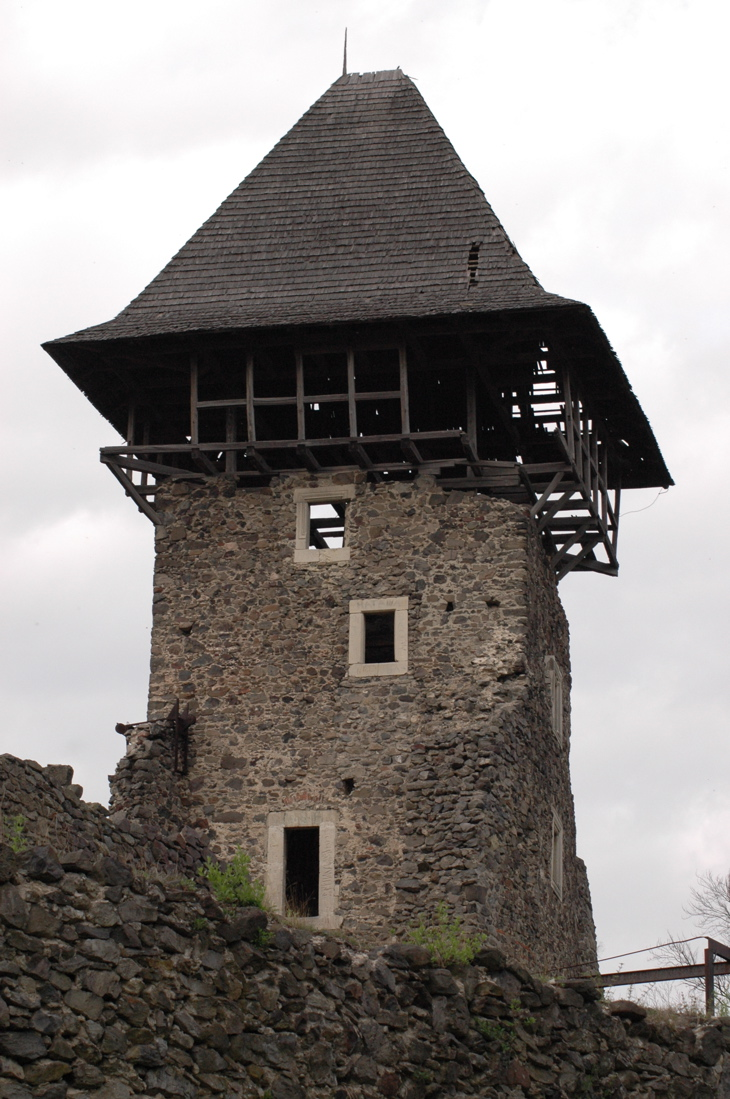
Nevytske Castle, today in Ukraine, was possessed by John Drugeth and his descendants since 1332

Beside the dignity of Palatine, John became ispán of various counties. He governed Ung, Zemplén and Somogy counties since the autumn of 1328. It is plausible that the ispánates of Fejér and Tolna counties were attached still in that year, holding these positions until his death too. He also acquired the governance of Bács County sometime after the middle of 1329 (he held that office until January 1333). His exceptional position is well illustrated by that, that two old confidants, Mikcs Ákos and Demetrius Nekcsei had to resign from important counties – Somogy and Bács, respectively – in favor of a homo novus ("newcomer" or "foreigner") noble, John Drugeth. He was the first office-holder, who styled himself with the name of the kingdom (Latin: Palatini Hungarie) in his seal and charters. The general assembly of Valkó County in 1330 also referred to him as "Palatine of whole Hungary" (Latin: domino Johanni palatino totius Hungarie), similarly to the full title of the Ban of Slavonia. His palatinal seal (1332) depicted a centaur holding a spear and shield with the coat-of-arms of the Drugeths in his hands. Art historian Ágnes Kurcz considered John's seal depicted Chiron based on the sample of Antique gemstones which method was widespread in the Kingdom of France. The portrayal of centaur may reflects John's dual Neapolitan–Hungarian identity and parallel loyalty to both kings. John became special patron of the Order of Saint Lazarus in Hungary in 1330. It is plausible that John participated in the royal campaign against Wallachia in the autumn of 1330, and was also present in the Battle of Posada.

John Drugeth established his palatinal court in Óbuda, where he also functioned as castellan. He issued his first surviving own document here in April 1329. His first, albeit only provisional vice-palatine ("viceiudex") was the aforementioned Giacomino of Italian origin – also vice-castellan of Óbuda, who arrived to Hungary as a member of the Drugeths' entourage. He was succeeded as vice-palatine by Peter in 1330, then Gregory in 1333. One of his collector of fines is also known by name, Gregory Felszántói, who also retained his office under William Drugeth. As Palatine, John Drugeth was the first office-holder to have an actual official relationship with the eastern and western halves of the country at the same time, for he was not attached to family estates (as William inherited the Drugeth Province). He held general assemblies for more and more regions of the Kingdom of Hungary. Throughout 1329, John summoned generalis congregatios in the counties of Somogy, Baranya (May), Nógrád, Abaúj, Borsod, Gömör (the province of his son), Zemplén, Ung (August), Szabolcs and Arad (September–October). He held an assembly for Bereg, Ugocsa and Pest counties in January–February 1330, and for Zala, Veszprém and Sopron counties in May–June 1331. During the various assemblies, occasionally John also judged over lawsuits which concerned the possessions of other counties (for instance, when he summoned an assembly in Arad County, he also dealt with issues as a forum for appeal from Gömör County in 1329). He forwarded the protracted and postponed lawsuits not to his permanent seat (Óbuda) but to the venue of a later county congregatio.

Unlike his deceased brother and son, the extent of John's estate acquisitions was quite moderate. He was granted Nevicke Castle (present-day Nevytske, Ukraine) and its lordship in Ung County by Charles I in 1332. This was the only great donation he received from the Hungarian monarch during his stay in the kingdom. John also became the owner of the castle' accessories, including the villages of Nagykapos and Mocsár (present-day Veľké Kapušany and Močiar in Slovakia, respectively). He acquired the village of Zemplén (today Zemplín, Slovakia) with its fair. He also owned Göbölfalva (also Schreibersdorf, today Buglovce, Slovakia) in Szepes County. All of his wealth was inherited by his son William. John donated his estate of Zsidány in Sopron County to the Cistercian Klostermarienberg Abbey (Borsmonostor, today part of Mannersdorf an der Rabnitz, Austria) in 1330. Due to his judicial activity as ispán then Palatine, according to which he benefited from part of the estate in question during a lawsuit (court fines and confiscations), he also owned several lands for longer or shorter periods – including, for instance Börvely in Szatmár County (present-day Berveni, Romania), Haraszti in Bodrog County, Szemlék in Csanád County (today Semlac, Romania). He passed these lands into the hands of his familiares or allowed the original owners to redeem them in exchange for money.

== Final journey and death ==
After years of negotiations, Charles visited his uncle, Robert, in Naples in the summer of 1333. Because of his existing relationships in his homeland, John Drugeth also joined his accompaniment in Zagreb around 15 June – despite palatines often substituted the kings during their absence for foreign military campaigns –, where from they traveled further to the western coast of the Adriatic Sea via Modruš, and they sailed into Southern Italy. During his absence, John's son William Drugeth was appointed Deputy Palatine of Hungary, an entirely unique position in the kingdom, and also took over the governance of his father's counties and castles in this capacity. The diplomatic mission arrived to Naples in July. Two months later, Charles' son, Andrew, was betrothed to Robert's granddaughter, Joanna, who had been made her grandfather's heir. It is plausible, John Drugeth took an active part in the negotiations, mediating between the two monarchs, as he was subject of both of them, thus enjoying a unique status in the diplomatic mission. In mid-October, Robert exempted from his obligations after his fiefdoms in Southern Italy.

John Drugeth was last mentioned as a living person in Hungarian records on 25 November 1333. Charles and his escort returned to Hungary by March 1334. William was first styled as Palatine of Hungary on 17 May, consequently John was deceased by then. William was appointed to that position shortly before, as his seal was not ready then. Whether John returned to Hungary with his king in early 1334 or remained in Naples, is unknown. In the first case, John fell ill and died sometime in April or May 1334, as his son was last referred to as deputy palatine in the previous month. In the second case, he definitely died after January 1334 (when Charles began the journey home), as the king would not have waited a few months for William's appointment, and the news of his death may have arrived in the spring to Hungary. Historian Enikő Spekner considers John died in late 1333 or early 1334 in the Kingdom of Naples, and was buried in his original homeland. It is possible that John Drugeth, due to his deteriorating health, set out on the journey from the outset without intending to return. Through his younger sons, Nicholas and John, he was ancestor of the Gerény and Homonna branches of the Drugeth family. The latter branch flourished until the 17th century, becoming extinct in 1684.

== Sources ==
- Engel, Pál (1996). Magyarország világi archontológiája, 1301–1457, I. [Secular Archontology of Hungary, 1301–1457, Volume I] (in Hungarian). História, MTA Történettudományi Intézete. ISBN 963-8312-44-0.
- Hardi, Đura (2012). Drugeti. Povest o usponu i padu porodice pratilaca Anžujskih kraljeva [Drugeths. The History of the Rise and Decline of the Escorts of Angevin Kings] (in Serbo-Croatian (Latin script)). Faculty of Philosophy, University of Novi Sad. ISBN 978-86-6065-108-4.
- Kurcz, Ágnes (1988). Lovagi kultúra Magyarországon a 13–14. században [Chivalric Culture in Hungary in the 13–14th Centuries] (in Hungarian). Akadémiai Kiadó. ISBN 963-05-4737-6.
- Markó, László (2006). A magyar állam főméltóságai Szent Istvántól napjainkig: Életrajzi Lexikon [Great Officers of State in Hungary from King Saint Stephen to Our Days: A Biographical Encyclopedia] (in Hungarian). Helikon Kiadó. ISBN 963-208-970-7.
- Miskolczy, István (1936). "A Drugetek őseiről [The Ancestors of the Drugets]". Turul (in Hungarian). 50 (1–2). Magyar Heraldikai és Genealógiai Társaság: 1–5. ISSN 1216-7258.
- Proctor-Tiffany, Mariah (2019). Medieval Art in Motion: The Inventory and Gift Giving of Queen Clémence de Hongrie. The Pennsylvania State University Press. ISBN 9780271081120.
- Spekner, Enikő (2015). Hogyan lett Buda a középkori Magyarország fővárosa? A budai királyi székhely története a 12. század végétől a 14. század közepéig [How did Buda become the capital of medieval Hungary? The history of the royal seat of Buda from the end of the twelfth century to the middle of the fourteenth] (in Hungarian). Budapesti Történeti Múzeum. ISBN 978-615-5341-19-9.
- Szőcs, Tibor (2014). A nádori intézmény korai története, 1000–1342 [An Early History of the Palatinal Institution: 1000–1342] (in Hungarian). Magyar Tudományos Akadémia Támogatott Kutatások Irodája. ISBN 978-963-508-697-9.
- Zsoldos, Attila (2017). A Druget-tartomány története 1315–1342 [The History of the Druget Province 1315–1342] (in Hungarian). MTA Bölcsészettudományi Kutatóközpont Történettudományi Intézete. ISBN 978-963-4160-63-2.

John I House of Drugeth Born: c. 1286 Died: April/May 1334
Political offices
Preceded by Philip Drugeth	Palatine of Hungary; 1328–1333/4	Succeeded by William Drugeth
