= John II Drugeth =

Hungarian nobleman

John (II) Drugeth

Ispán of Ung
- Reign: 1354–1362
- Predecessor: Nicholas Drugeth
- Successor: Paul Lackfi
- Born: c. 1320
- Died: 1362
- Noble family: House of Drugeth
- Issue: Sebastian; John IV; Nicholas II; Stephen I Francis I
- Father: John I Drugeth
- Mother: Pasqua de Bononensi

John (II) Drugeth de Homonna (also Druget, Hungarian: homonnai Druget (II.) János, Slovak: Ján II. Druget Humenský; c. 1320–1362) was a Neapolitan-born Hungarian nobleman. As a minor son of his namesake father, he arrived to the Kingdom of Hungary along with his family upon the invitation of King Charles I at the turn of 1327 and 1328, becoming the most powerful family in Hungary. However, the newly enthroned Louis I confiscated most of their wealth in 1342. John succeeded his brother Nicholas as the ispán of Ung County in 1354. John was the founder and first member of the Homonna branch of the Drugeth family. This remained the only surviving cadet branch of the family by the early 15th century, consequently all later Drugeths descended from John. The Drugeth family became extinct in 1684.

== Queen Clementia's godson ==
John II was the third and youngest son of John I Drugeth and Pasqua de Bononensi. The Drugeth family belonged to those Neapolitan elite of Ultramontane (French or Provençal) origin, who arrived to Apulia (Southern Italy) with Charles I of Anjou in 1266. By the first decade of the 14th century, brothers Philip and John Sr. were considered as the most important members of the family. While John entered the service of Clementia, briefly Queen consort of France and Navarre, John II was much more younger than his older brothers, William and Nicholas I, and plausibly Philip II. He was born in the late 1310s or early 1320s, and his godmother was Queen Clementia herself, according to her last will and testament in 1328. They also had a sister, Clementia, who was of a similar age as John, and was also a godchild of the dowager queen. The Drugeth children grew up together in the queenly court of Clementia at Paris and Aix-en-Provence. It is also plausible that John was already born there.

== Career in Hungary ==
John Drugeth and his family were invited from Naples to Hungary by King Charles I in order to inherit the wealth and power of Philip Drugeth, who died in 1327. While John succeeded his brother as Palatine of Hungary, William, who was in his twenties, inherited his late uncle's wealth and large-scale province in Northeast Hungary, instantly becoming the richest and most powerful magnate in the Kingdom of Hungary. There is no mention of John in the Hungarian contemporary records until 1343, probably because of his minority. When the childless William compiled his last testament in August 1330, where he designated as the heir of all of his possessions his younger brother Nicholas under the principle of primogeniture (i.e. the youngest brother John II was excluded from the inheritance). John belonged to the entourage of his king Charles into the Kingdom of Naples in 1333, where the Hungarian monarch negotiated with his uncle Robert, King of Naples.

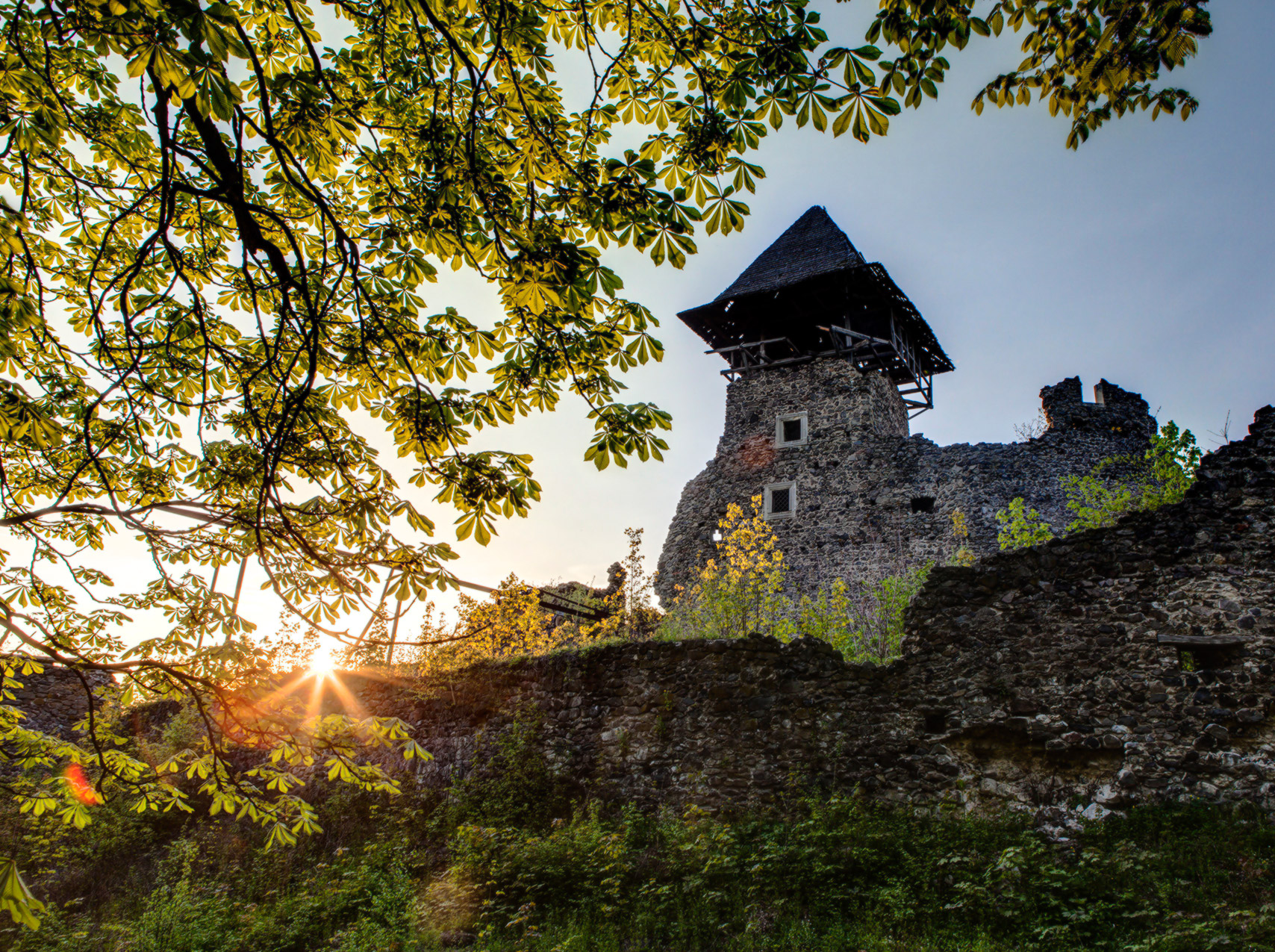
John Drugeth co-owned Nevytske Castle (today in Ukraine) since 1343

King Charles and William Drugeth died within weeks in 1342. As William had no male descendants, Nicholas would have inherited his large wealth and power in Northeast Hungary, but as a result of court intrigues, the newly enthroned Louis I confiscated the vast majority of the inheritance, while the Drugeths were deprived from power. On 7 January 1343, a court hearing was held, where Nicholas and John II – i.e. he had reached the age of majority by then – submitted a charter in order to prove their right to William's heritage. As a result, the brothers were given back three castles – Barkó (Brekov, Slovakia), Jeszenő (Jasenov, Slovakia) and Nevicke (Nevytske, Ukraine) – out of the nine that they used to have, and they were virtually pushed back within the territory of Ung and Zemplén counties, a relatively uninhabited area at the northeast corner of the kingdom. Nicholas and John became the possessors of the Homonna lordship in Zemplén County, which consisted of 22 villages, including its centre Homonna (Humenné, Slovakia). Following that John appeared in contemporary documents solely in his older brother's companion in various estate matters and litigations in the next decade, for instance during a pro-longed lawsuit between them and the chapter of Lelesz (Leles).

After Nicholas was appointed Judge royal in 1354, John succeeded him as ispán of Ung County. Nicholas died in the next year, thus John became the paterfamilias of the Drugeth family. He had five sons from his unidentified wife: Sebastian, John IV, Nicholas II, Stephen I and Francis I, who have not held any offices in their lifetime. The declining period began in the life of the Drugeth family, which reached its lowest point during the reign of Sigismund (John V even joined the conspiracy against the king in 1403). While Nicholas' descendants lived in Gerény (present-day Horjani, a borough of Uzhhorod), John and his sons administered the family estates in Zemplén County after a possible division of the heritage, establishing the lordship of Homonna, from which his descendants also took their noble prefix, fully integrating into the local Hungarian nobility. John II died in 1362. The Homonna branch of the family, descended from John through his son Nicholas II, continued to exist until 1684, as the only surviving cadet branch of the Drugeth family.

== Sources ==
- Engel, Pál (1996). Magyarország világi archontológiája, 1301–1457, I. [Secular Archontology of Hungary, 1301–1457, Volume I] (in Hungarian). História, MTA Történettudományi Intézete. ISBN 963-8312-44-0.
- Hardi, Đura (2012). Drugeti. Povest o usponu i padu porodice pratilaca Anžujskih kraljeva [Drugeths. The History of the Rise and Decline of the Escorts of Angevin Kings] (in Serbo-Croatian (Latin script)). Faculty of Philosophy, University of Novi Sad. ISBN 978-86-6065-108-4.
- Zsoldos, Attila (2017). A Druget-tartomány története 1315–1342 [The History of the Druget Province 1315–1342] (in Hungarian). MTA Bölcsészettudományi Kutatóközpont Történettudományi Intézete. ISBN 978-963-4160-63-2.

John II House of Drugeth Born: c. 1320 Died: 1362
Political offices
Preceded by Nicholas Drugeth	Ispán of Ung; 1354–1362	Succeeded by Paul Lackfi
