= Kapušianske Kľačany =

Municipality in Slovakia

Kapušianske Kľačany Nyarádkelecsény
- Municipality
- Flag

- Location of Kapušianske Kľačany in the Košice Region Location of Kapušianske Kľačany in Slovakia
- Coordinates: 48.53°N 22.12°E
- Country: Slovakia
- Region: Košice Region
- District: Michalovce District
- First mentioned: 1315

Area
  - Total: 20.31 km^{2} (7.84 sq mi)
- Elevation: 102 m (335 ft)

Population (2025)
  - Total: 977
- Time zone: UTC+1 (CET)
  - Summer (DST): UTC+2 (CEST)
- Postal code: 790 1
- Area code: +421 56
- Vehicle registration plate (until 2022): MI
- Website: kapusianskeklacany.sk

Kapušianske Kľačany (Slovak pronunciation: [ˈkapuʂɪɐnske ˈkʎatʂani]; Hungarian: Nyarádkelecsény) is a village and municipality in Michalovce District in the Kosice Region of eastern Slovakia. It was created in 1943 by merging the villages Kľačiany, Močiar and Ňarád, all first recorded in 1315. The current name Kapušianske Kľačany originated in 1948.

== Etymology ==
Slovak Kľačane, see Kľačany for the details. The theory is supported also by the local name Močiar ("swamp).

== History ==
In historical records the village was first mentioned in 1315. Before the establishment of independent Czechoslovakia in 1918, it was part of Ung County within the Kingdom of Hungary.

== Geography ==
The municipality lies at an altitude of 102 metres (335 ft) and covers an area of 20.31 km^{2} (7.84 sq mi) (2025).

== Population ==
Population statistic (10 years)
Year	1995	2005	2015	2025
Count	724	819	941	977
Difference		+13.12%	+14.89%	+3.82%

Population statistic
Year	2024	2025
Count	976	977
Difference		+0.10%

It has a population of 977 people (31 December 2025).

=== Ethnicity ===
Census 2021 (1+ %)
Ethnicity	Number	Fraction
Hungarian	799	85.27%
Romani	110	11.73%
Slovak	100	10.67%
Not found out	75	8%
Total	937	

In year 2021 was 937 people by ethnicity 799 as Hungarian, 110 as Romani, 100 as Slovak, 75 as Not found out, 1 as Rusyn, 1 as Polish, 1 as German, 1 as Other and 1 as English.

Note on population: The difference values of population numbers in the table "Population statistic" and in the sections "Ethnicity" & "Religion" is caused by the use of various statistical methods.

=== Religion ===
Census 2021 (1+ %)
Religion	Number	Fraction
Calvinist Church	523	55.82%
Roman Catholic Church	182	19.42%
Greek Catholic Church	89	9.5%
Not found out	62	6.62%
None	62	6.62%
Evangelical Church	13	1.39%
Total	937	

In year 2021 was 937 people by religion 523 from Calvinist Church, 182 from Roman Catholic Church, 89 from Greek Catholic Church, 62 from Not found out, 62 from None, 13 from Evangelical Church, 2 from Eastern Orthodox Church, 1 from Other and not ascertained christian church, 1 from Christian Congregations in Slovakia, 1 from Other and 1 from Buddhism.

== Government ==
The village relies on the services of Veľké Kapušany

== Transport ==
The nearest railway station is 4 km (2.5 mi) away at Veľké Kapušany.

== Genealogical resources ==
The records for genealogical research are available at the state archive "Statny Archiv in Kosice, Presov, Slovakia":

- Roman Catholic church records (births/marriages/deaths): 1831 – 1911 (parish B)
- Greek Catholic church records (births/marriages/deaths): 1813 – 1875 (parish B)
- Reformated church records (births/marriages/deaths): 1762 – 1852 (parish A)

== See also ==
- List of municipalities and towns in Slovakia
