= Clementia of Hungary =

Queen of France and Navarre from 1315 to 1316

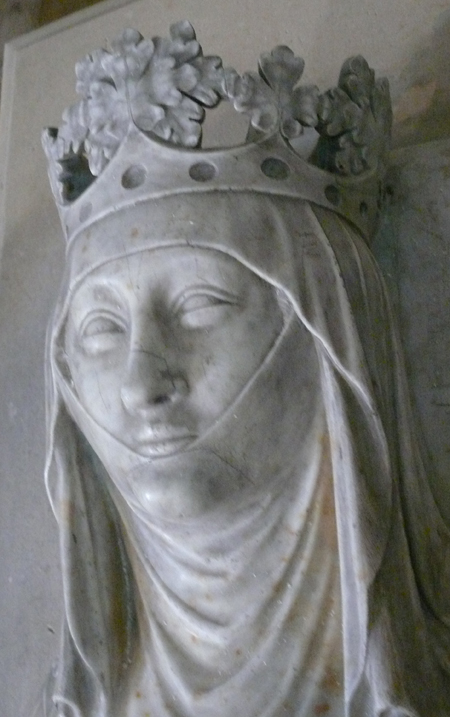
- Tomb effigy in the Basilica of Saint-Denis

Queen consort of France and Navarre
- Tenure: 19 August 1315 – 5 June 1316
- Coronation: 24 August 1315
- Born: 1293; Naples
- Died: 13 October 1328 (aged 34–35)
- Spouse: Louis X of France (m. 1315; died 1316)
- Issue: John I of France
- House: Capetian House of Anjou
- Father: Charles Martel of Anjou
- Mother: Clemence of Austria

Clementia of Hungary (French: Clémence; 1293–13 October 1328) was Queen of France and Navarre as the second wife of King Louis X.

== Life ==
Clementia was the daughter of Charles Martel of Anjou, the titular King of Hungary, and Clemence of Austria. Both parents died during her early childhood, and Mary of Hungary, Clementia's grandmother, raised her. The family claimed Hungary through Mary, and so although Clementia was born and grew up in Naples, she was considered a Hungarian princess.

=== Queen ===
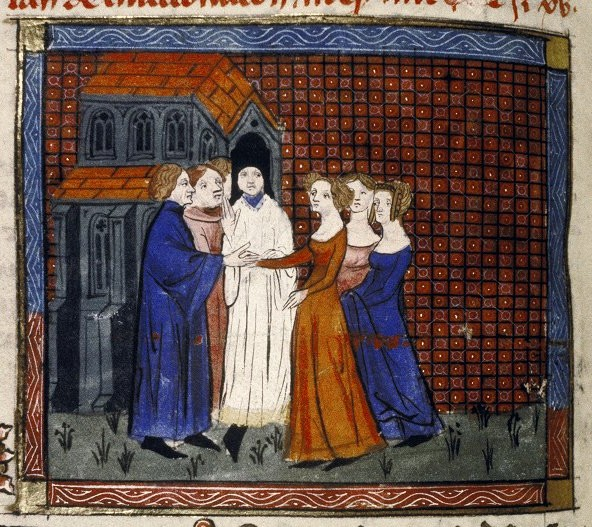
The marriage of Louis X and Clementia

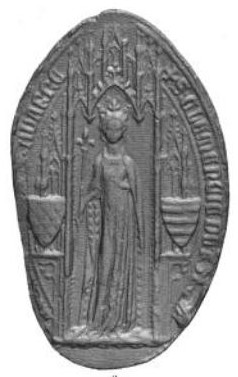
Seal of Queen Clementia

Coat of arms as a queen of France

When Philip IV of France died, his eldest son, Louis I of Navarre, became King of France. Louis' wife Margaret had been locked up in Château Gaillard since 1314 after being found guilty of adultery by King Philip, on the testimony of, amongst others, Louis's sister Isabella. Since there had been no formal annulment, Margaret technically became queen consort when Louis acceded to the throne upon Philip's death, though she was kept locked up. In 1315, the queen died, allegedly strangled or otherwise murdered to clear the way for her husband to remarry. Louis chose Clementia and they married on 19 August 1315; she was crowned queen at Reims on 24 August.

Louis died in June 1316, leaving Clementia several months pregnant. Louis' brother Philip became regent, denying the rights of Clementia's stepdaughter Joan, who was too young and whose paternity was questioned; and of Clementia herself, who was considered unsuitable to be regent. She gave birth to a son named John in November 1316. King from the moment of his birth, he lived only five days, whereupon the throne was seized by his uncle, who now became Philip V. Clementia and Philip quarrelled over this and he refused to pay her the income Louis had promised her. She wrote repeatedly to Pope John XXII and to her family for help.

=== Later life ===
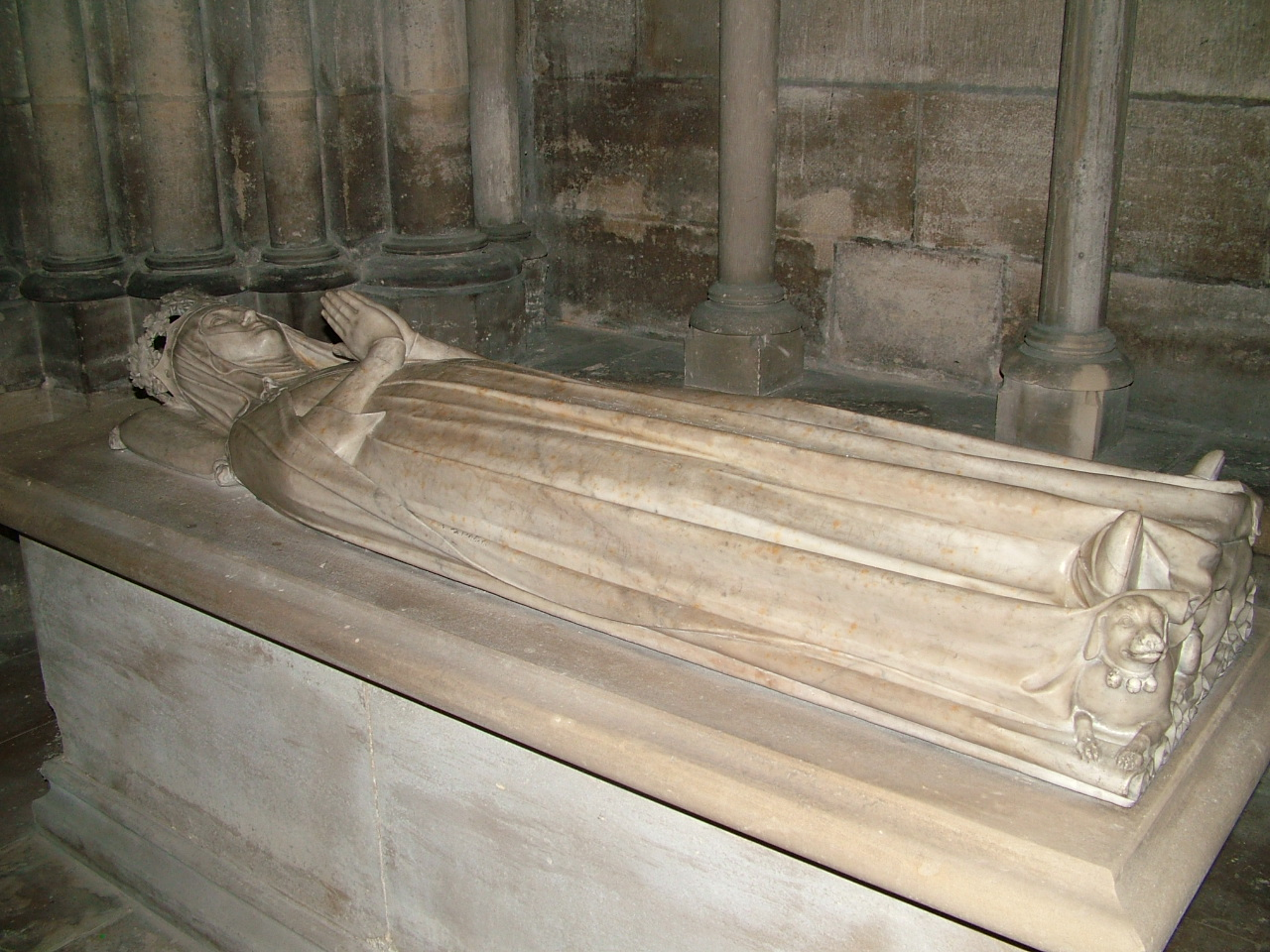
Full-sized tomb effigy of Queen Clementia at Saint-Denis

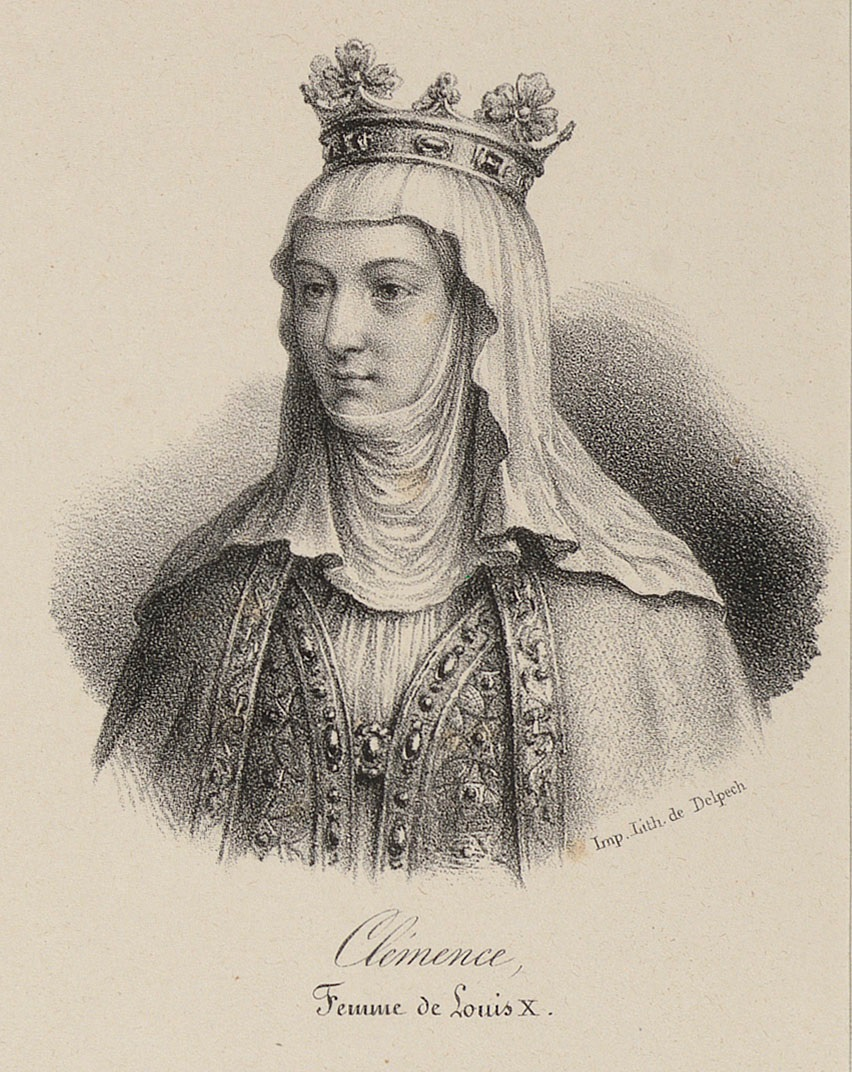
19th century lithograph of Queen Clementia by François-Séraphin Delpech

She then left the French court for Aix-en-Provence, where she stayed until 1321, when she returned to Paris. She actively participated in royal life in Paris, and owned thirteen estates around Paris and in Normandy. In 1326, she commissioned a tomb effigy for her great-grandfather, Charles I, the brother of Louis IX. She owned the Peterborough Psalter and she probably sent the Reliquary Shrine of Elizabeth of Hungary, now at The Cloisters, to her sister-in-law in Buda. Through her patronage and gift-giving she sought to enhance the reputation in Paris of her Angevin family and of her husband. John I Drugeth and his family were prominent members of her household in Paris. Clementia was also the godmother of his youngest children, John II and Clementia, who was named after their mistress.

Upon her death 13 October 1328, at age thirty-five, her possessions were sold. She was buried on 15 October in the now-demolished church of the Couvent des Jacobins in Paris, and her effigy is now in the Basilica of St Denis.

== Inventory ==
Queen Clementia is best known for the remarkable inventory that was made of her belongings. The ninety-nine-page document in French describes her works of art and material culture in great detail. Her many crown jewels, reliquaries, the textiles that decorated her domestic space and her chapel, the silver sculptures she owned, and even her clothing are all described. She had more than forty manuscripts. The inventory is also valuable because it details where she acquired many of her objects and who received them after her death.

== In fiction ==
Clementia is a character in Les Rois maudits (The Accursed Kings), a series of French historical novels by Maurice Druon. She is portrayed by Monique Lejeune in the 1972 French miniseries adaptation of the series, and by Serena Autieri in the 2005 adaptation.

== Sources ==
- Gaude-Ferragu, Murielle (2016). Queenship in Medieval France, 1300-1500. Translated by Krieger, Angela. Palgrave Macmillan.
- Previte-Orton, C.W. (1962). The Shorter Cambridge Medieval History. Vol. II. Cambridge at the University Press.

Clementia of Hungary Capetian House of Anjou Cadet branch of the Capetian dynasty Born: 1293 Died: 13 October 1328
French royalty
Vacant Title last held by Margaret of Burgundy	Queen consort of France and Navarre; 1315–1316	Vacant Title next held by Joan II of Burgundy
