= Peterborough Psalter =

Illuminated manuscripts

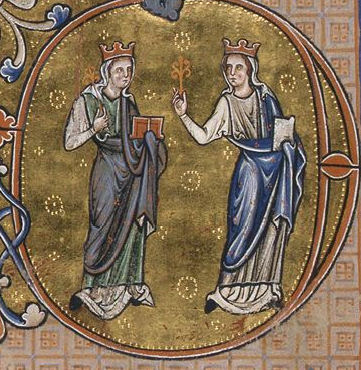
Mercy and Truth in the Cambridge MS

The Peterborough Psalter is a name given to two different illuminated manuscripts psalters produced in the scriptorium of Peterborough Abbey. One, from the early 13th century, is now in the Fitzwilliam Museum, Cambridge; the other, from the early 14th century, in the Royal Library of Belgium.

== Cambridge ==
The Peterborough Psalter in Cambridge was perhaps produced for Robert of Lindsey, abbot of Peterborough 1214–1222.

== Brussels ==
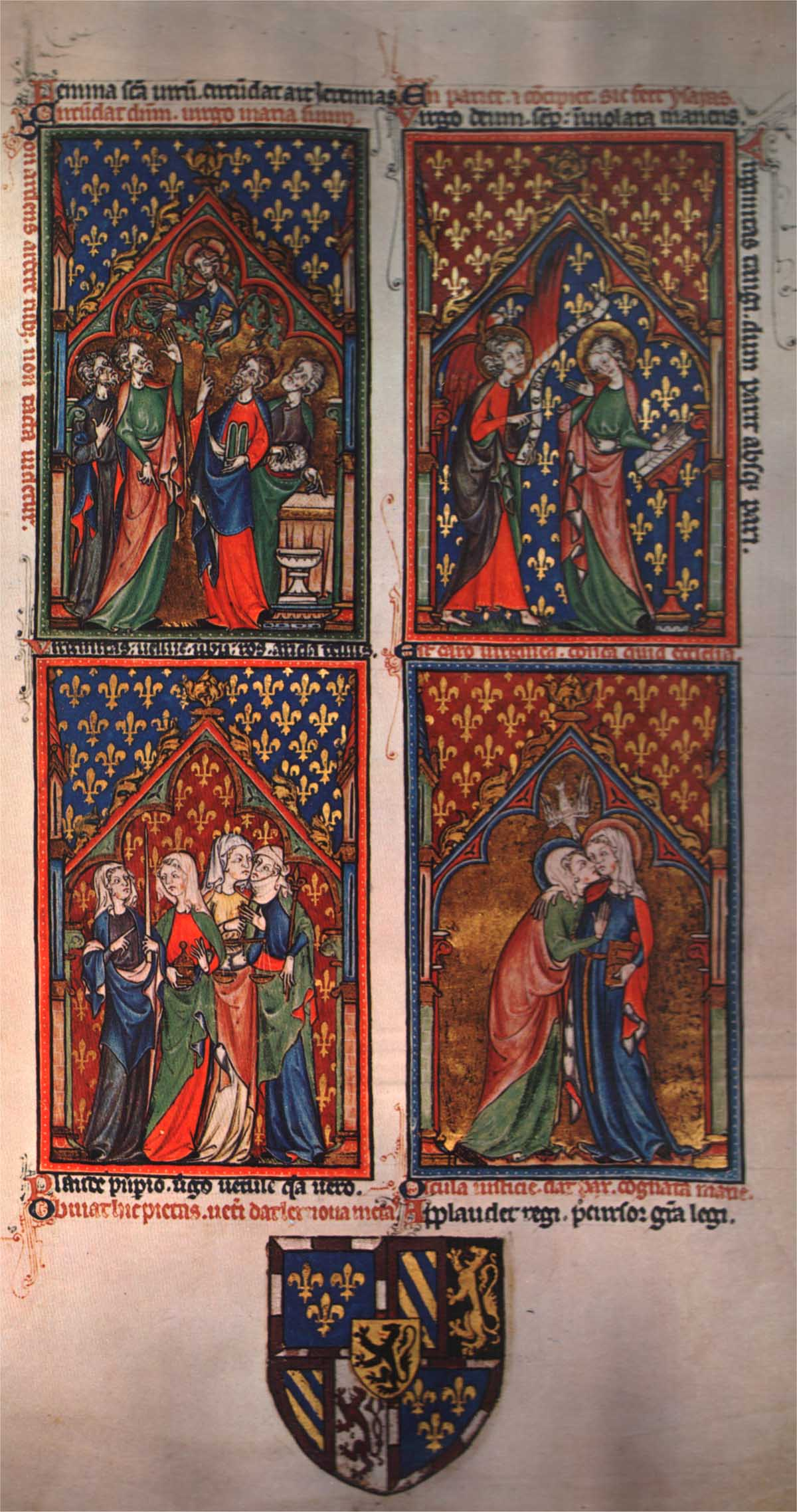
Royal Library of Belgium

The Peterborough Psalter in Brussels was produced for Abbot Godfrey of Croyland (died 1321). It dates to around 1300. Sometime 1317–1318, it was given as a gift to the papal nuncio Gaucelin d'Eux, who in turn gave it to Pope John XXII. It was in turn given to Clementia of Hungary, and after her death it was bought by Philip VI of France. At this time, the fleur de lys decoration seen throughout the manuscript was probably added. By 1467–1489 it was in the possession of the Duke of Burgundy, and at this time the coat of arms of Philip the Good was also added to the decoration on several pages. It remained in Brussels until 1794, when it was taken as loot by French troops, before being returned to Brussels in 1815.
