= Veľké Kapušany =

Veľké Kapušany Nagykapos
- Municipality
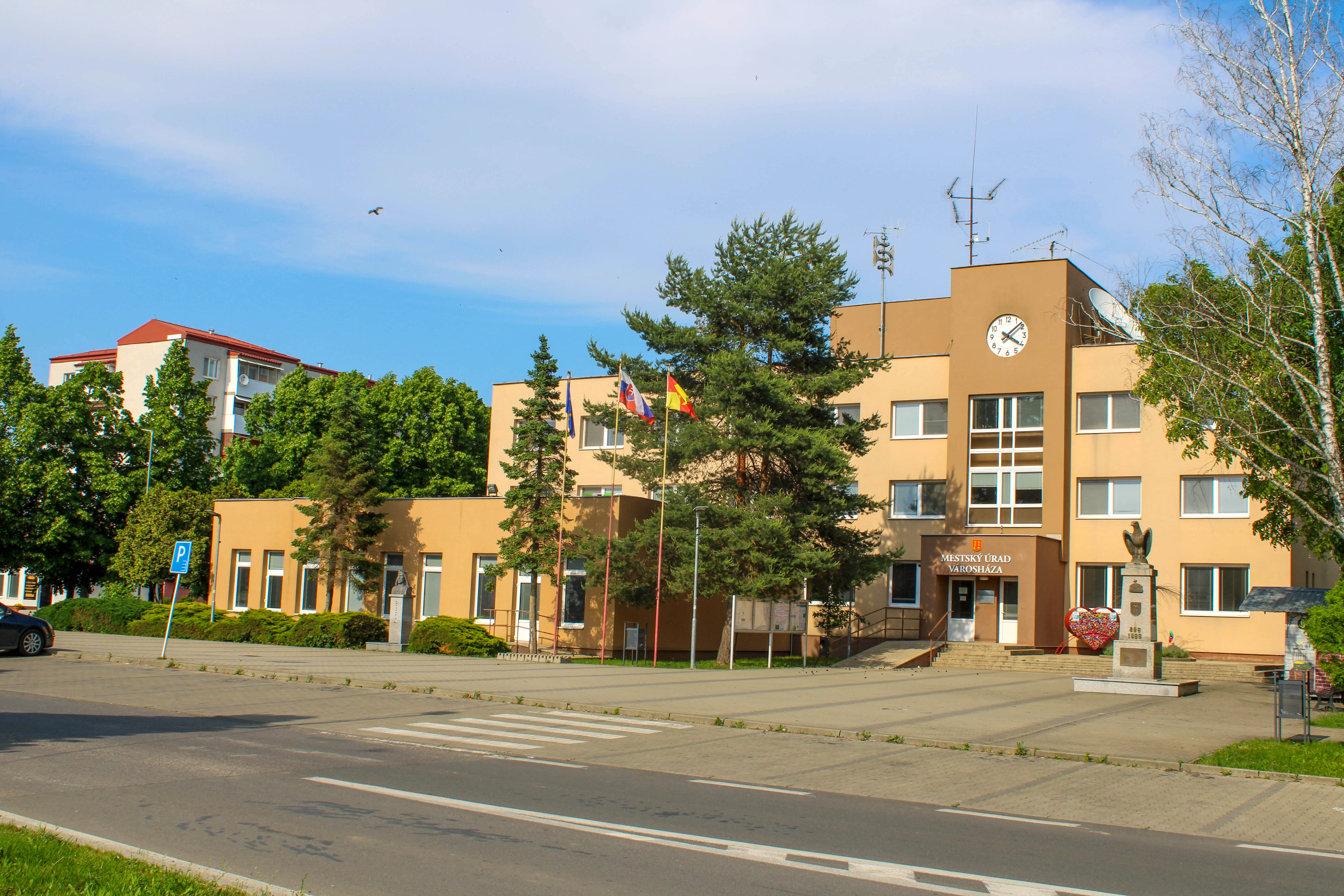
- Town hall in Veľké Kapušany

- Flag Coat of arms

- Location of Veľké Kapušany in the Košice Region Location of Veľké Kapušany in Slovakia
- Coordinates: 48.55°N 22.08°E
- Country: Slovakia
- Region: Košice Region
- District: Michalovce District
- First mentioned: 1211

Government
  - Mayor: Péter Petrikán

Area
  - Total: 29.61 km^{2} (11.43 sq mi)
- Elevation: 109 m (358 ft)

Population (2025)
  - Total: 8,285
- Time zone: UTC+1 (CET)
  - Summer (DST): UTC+2 (CEST)
- Postal code: 790 1
- Area code: +421 56
- Vehicle registration plate (until 2022): MI
- Website: www.vkapusany.sk

Veľké Kapušany (Slovak pronunciation: [ˈʋeʎkeː ˈkapuʂani]; Hungarian: Nagykapos) is a small town on the eastern plains of Slovakia, not far from the Ukrainian border.

== Geography ==
The municipality lies at an altitude of 109 metres (358 ft) and covers an area of 29.61 km^{2} (11.43 sq mi) (2025).

== Name ==
The name "Kapušany" is probably derived from the Hungarian word kapu, meaning "gate".

== History ==
The territory of the town has been settled since time immemorial (findings from the Neolithic period). From the second half of the 10th century until 1918, it was part of the Kingdom of Hungary. The first written references to the settlement stems from 1211 ("Kapos") and 1214 ("Copus"). The settlement was awarded town status in 1430. The town was the second largest settlement (after Uzhhorod) of the Ung County and frequently served as a temporary or permanent station for migrants (Germans, Rusyns, Poles, Hungarians etc.) from the east to the west.

In the town square there is a garden with a plaque commemorating the day the Germans marched into Veľké Kapušany in 1944. This is significant as both Jews and Romas were persecuted and murdered by the Nazis during World War II. At that time, Veľké Kapušany was part of Hungary (based on the First Vienna Award).

The following villages were merged with the town: Malé Kapušany (after 1913), Veškovce (1964).

== City parts ==
- Veľké Kapušany proper
- Veškovce

== Description ==
Wood processing, food and building materials industries and Slovak and Hungarian high schools are located there as is a railroad transfer facility for goods on the broad gauge railroad to Ukraine.

Many Communist remnants remain, notably the apartment buildings of the Communist era, where mainly poor Roma people now live. The rest of the population lives in mostly comfortable-looking homes and farms outside of the main thoroughfare but still within the town's borders.

There are several churches, but no synagogue in Veľké Kapušany. On the outskirts of the town there is a heavily damaged Jewish cemetery.

== Population ==
Historical population
Year	Pop.	±%
1970	5,047	—
1980	8,459	+67.6%
1991	9,421	+11.4%
2001	9,760	+3.6%
2011	9,406	−3.6%
2021	8,799	−6.5%
Source: Censuses

Population statistic (10 years)
Year	1995	2005	2015	2025
Count	9851	9504	9155	8285
Difference		−3.52%	−3.67%	−9.50%

Population statistic
Year	2024	2025
Count	8347	8285
Difference		−0.74%

It has a population of 8285 people (31 December 2025).

=== Ethnicity ===
Census 2021 (1+ %)
Ethnicity	Number	Fraction
Hungarian	5232	59.46%
Slovak	3144	35.73%
Not found out	891	10.12%
Romani	809	9.19%
Total	8799	

In year 2021 was 8799 people by ethnicity 5232 as Hungarian, 3144 as Slovak, 891 as Not found out, 809 as Romani, 65 as Ukrainian, 33 as Czech, 15 as Rusyn, 9 as Other, 6 as Chinese, 5 as German, 4 as Polish, 3 as Russian, 1 as Jewish, 1 as Vietnamese, 1 as Serbian, 1 as Romanian, 1 as Greek and 1 as English.

Note on population: The difference values of population numbers in the table "Population statistic" and in the sections "Ethnicity" & "Religion" is caused by the use of various statistical methods.

In 1910, 33.8% of the population was Jewish.

=== Religion ===
Census 2021 (1+ %)
Religion	Number	Fraction
Roman Catholic Church	3088	35.09%
Calvinist Church	1970	22.39%
None	1214	13.8%
Not found out	1161	13.19%
Greek Catholic Church	896	10.18%
Evangelical Church	174	1.98%
Jehovah's Witnesses	143	1.63%
Eastern Orthodox Church	93	1.06%
Total	8799	

In year 2021 was 8799 people by religion 3088 from Roman Catholic Church, 1970 from Calvinist Church, 1214 from None, 1161 from Not found out, 896 from Greek Catholic Church, 174 from Evangelical Church, 143 from Jehovah's Witnesses, 93 from Eastern Orthodox Church, 18 from United Methodist Church, 9 from Other and not ascertained christian church, 7 from Ad hoc movements, 6 from Christian Congregations in Slovakia, 5 from Islam, 5 from Other, 4 from Jewish community, 4 from Buddhism and 2 from Apostolic Church.

== Twin towns – sister cities ==
Veľké Kapušany is twinned with:

- Vásárosnamény, Hungary

== Gallery ==
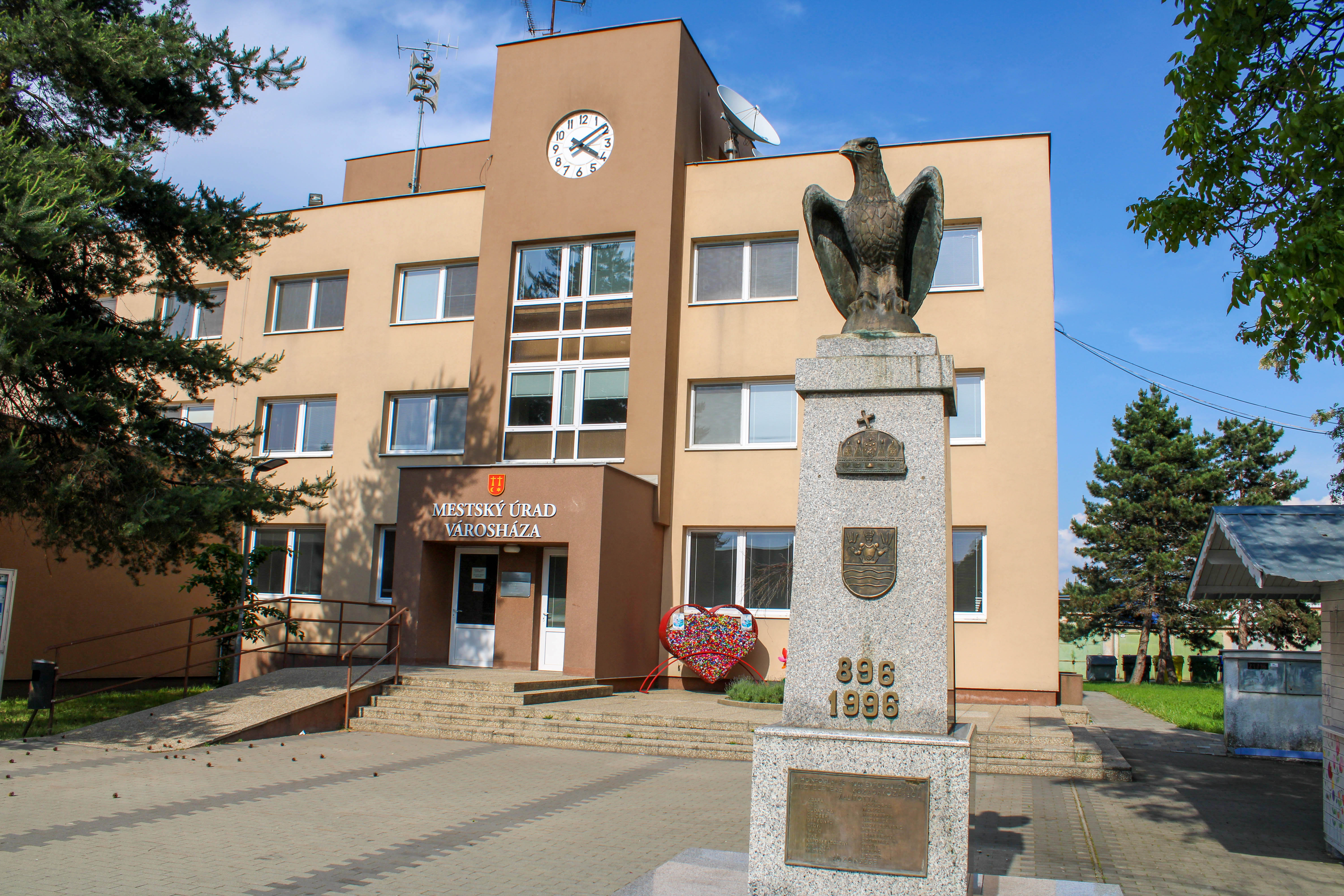
In front of the Town Hall there's a monument of „Turul-bird”

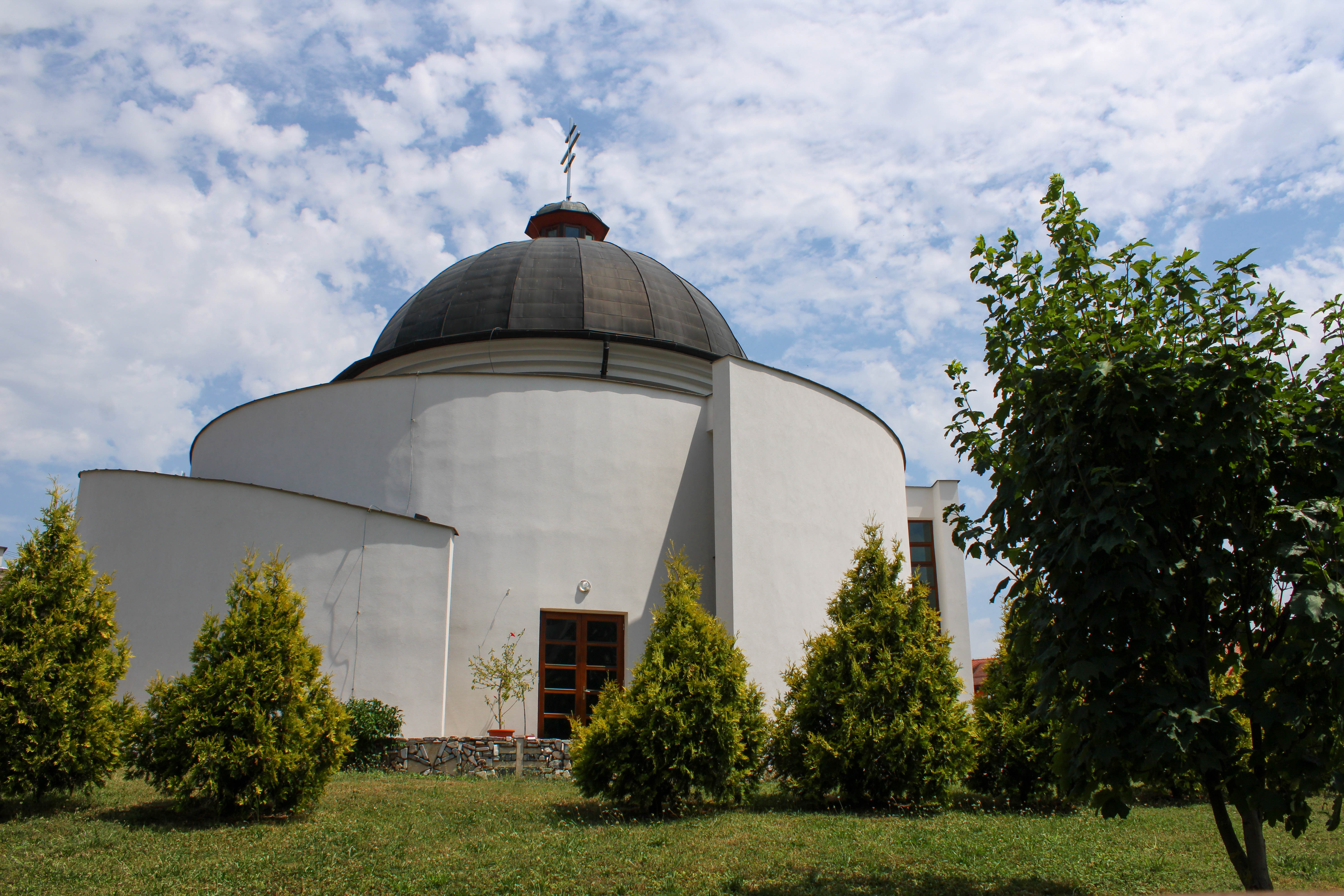
Greek Catholic Church

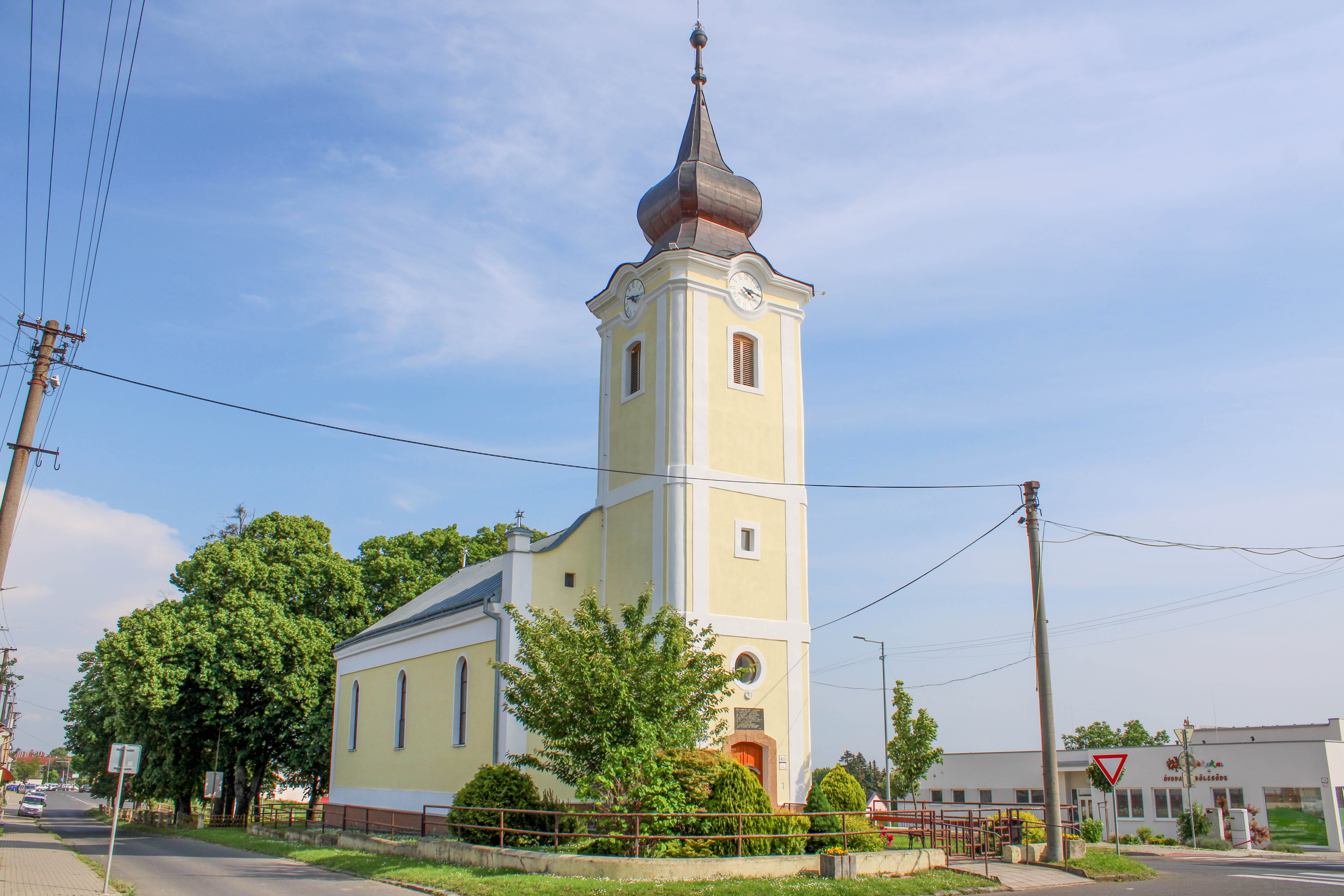
The oldest building is the Reformed Church which roots goes back to abouth 14th century

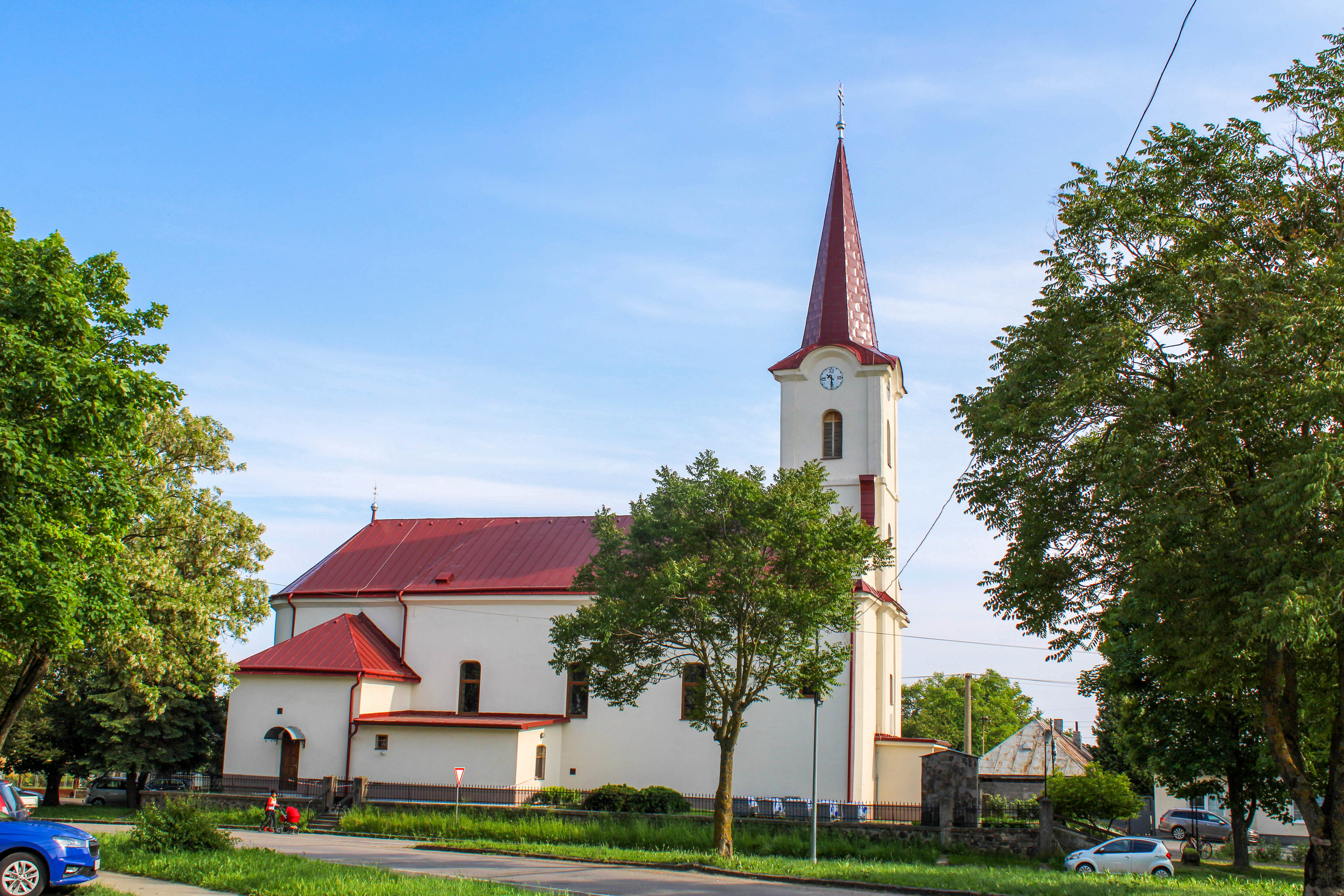
The Roman Catholic Church is already situated on territory of former Malé Kapušany and was built in 1807

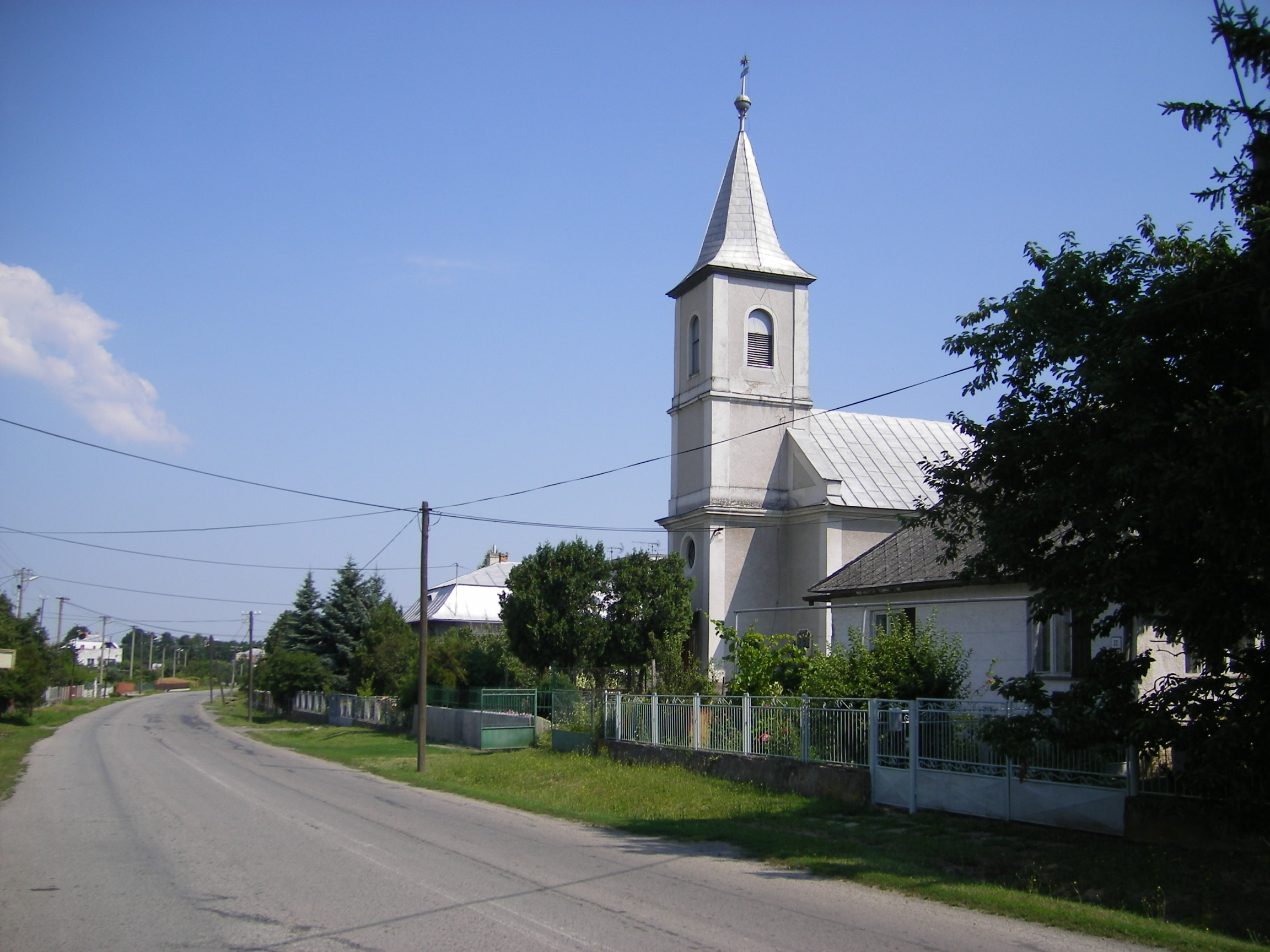
Reformed church in Veškovce, a rural borough that is part of the municipality

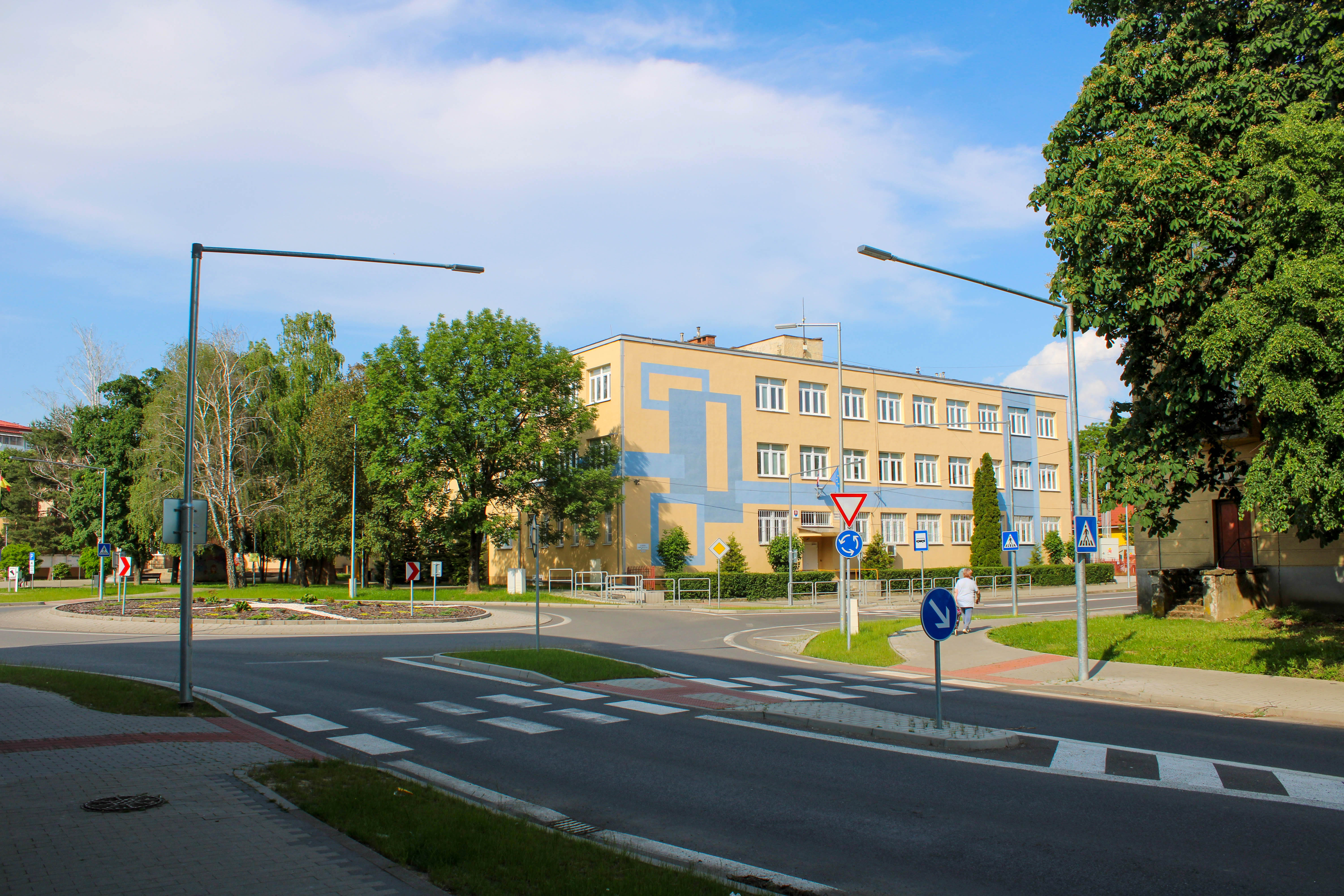
Slovak and Hungarian language gymnasium high school in Veľké Kapušany

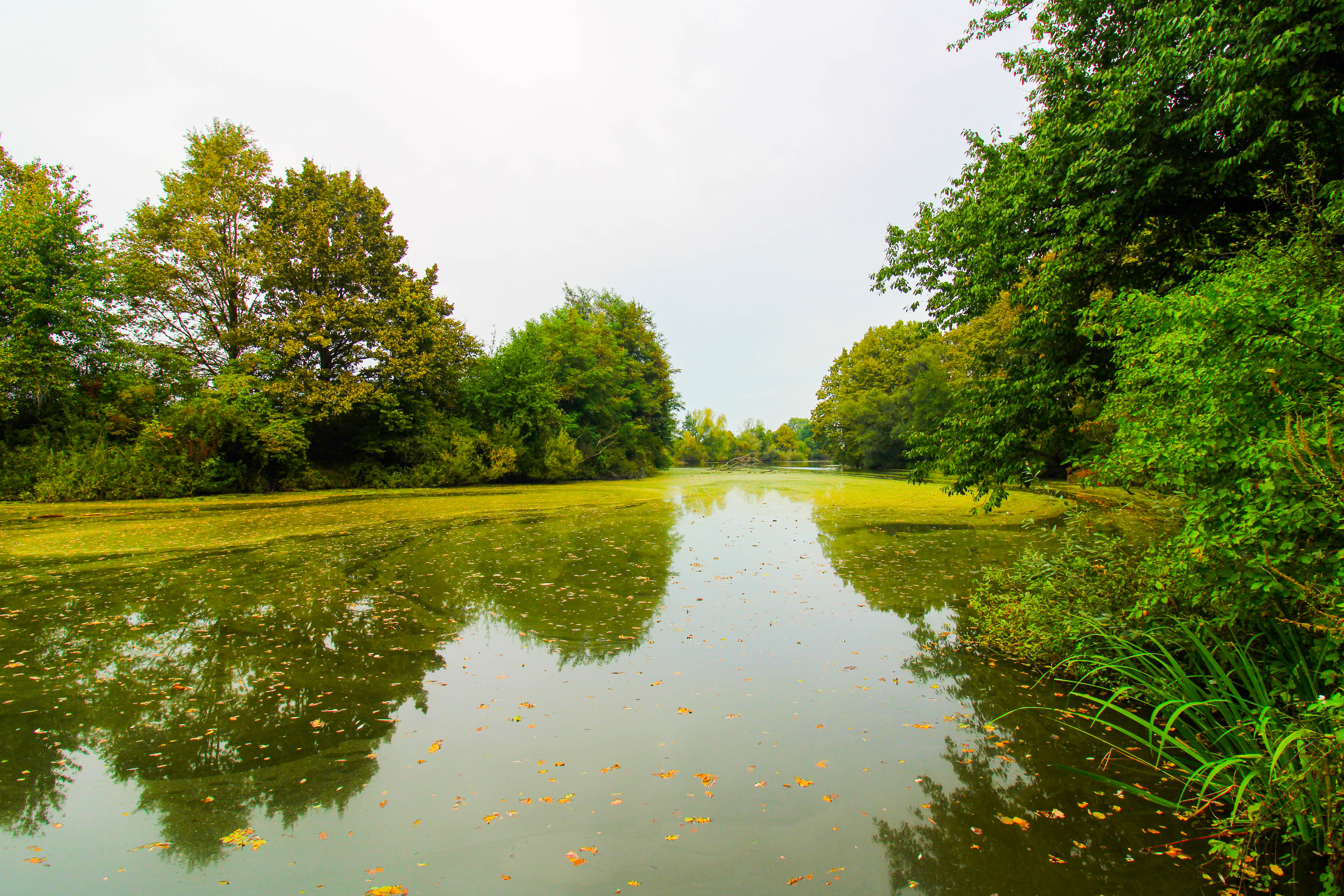
Within a 5 km proximity there is the Ortov Nature Reserve

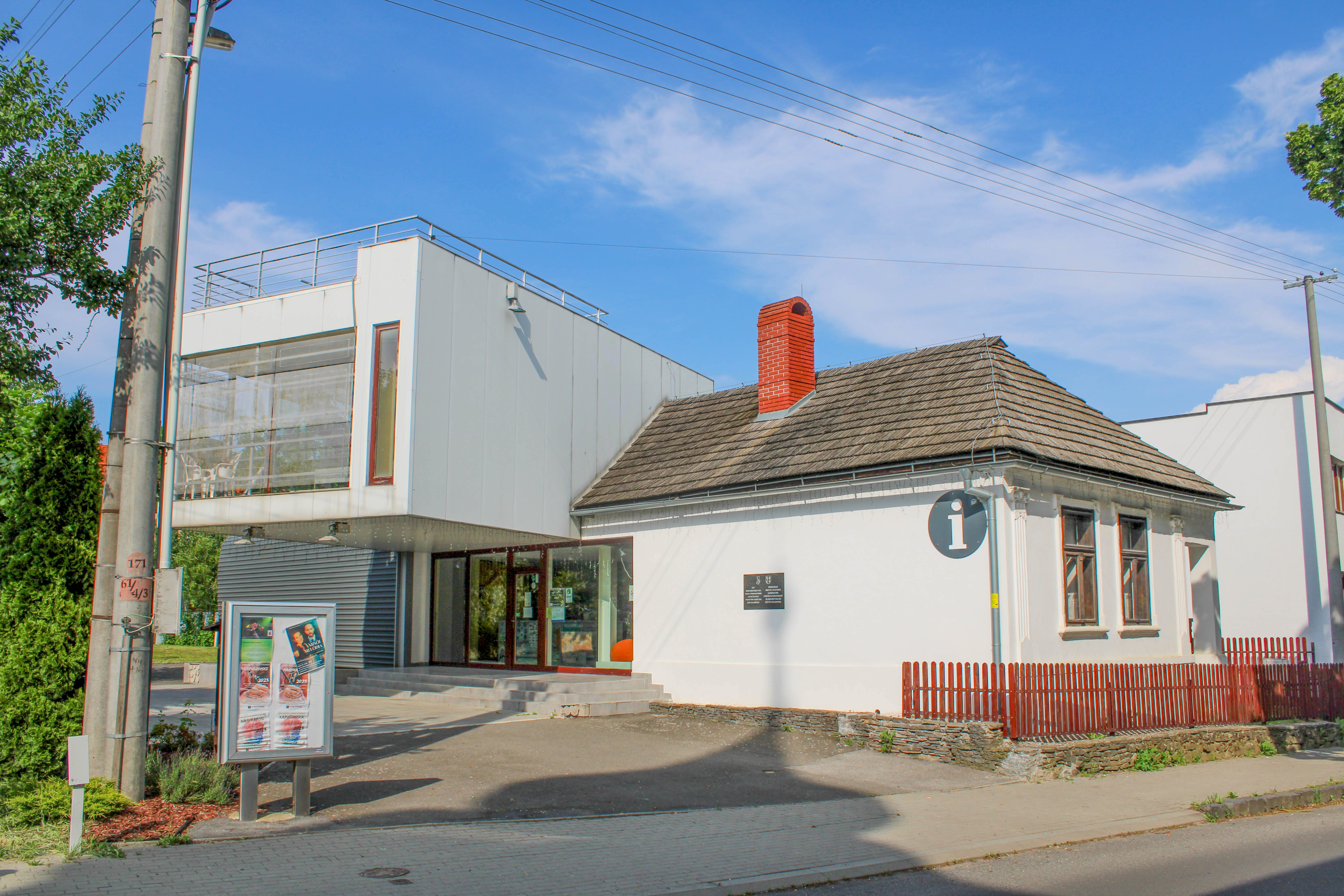
Turist Information Centre (TIC)

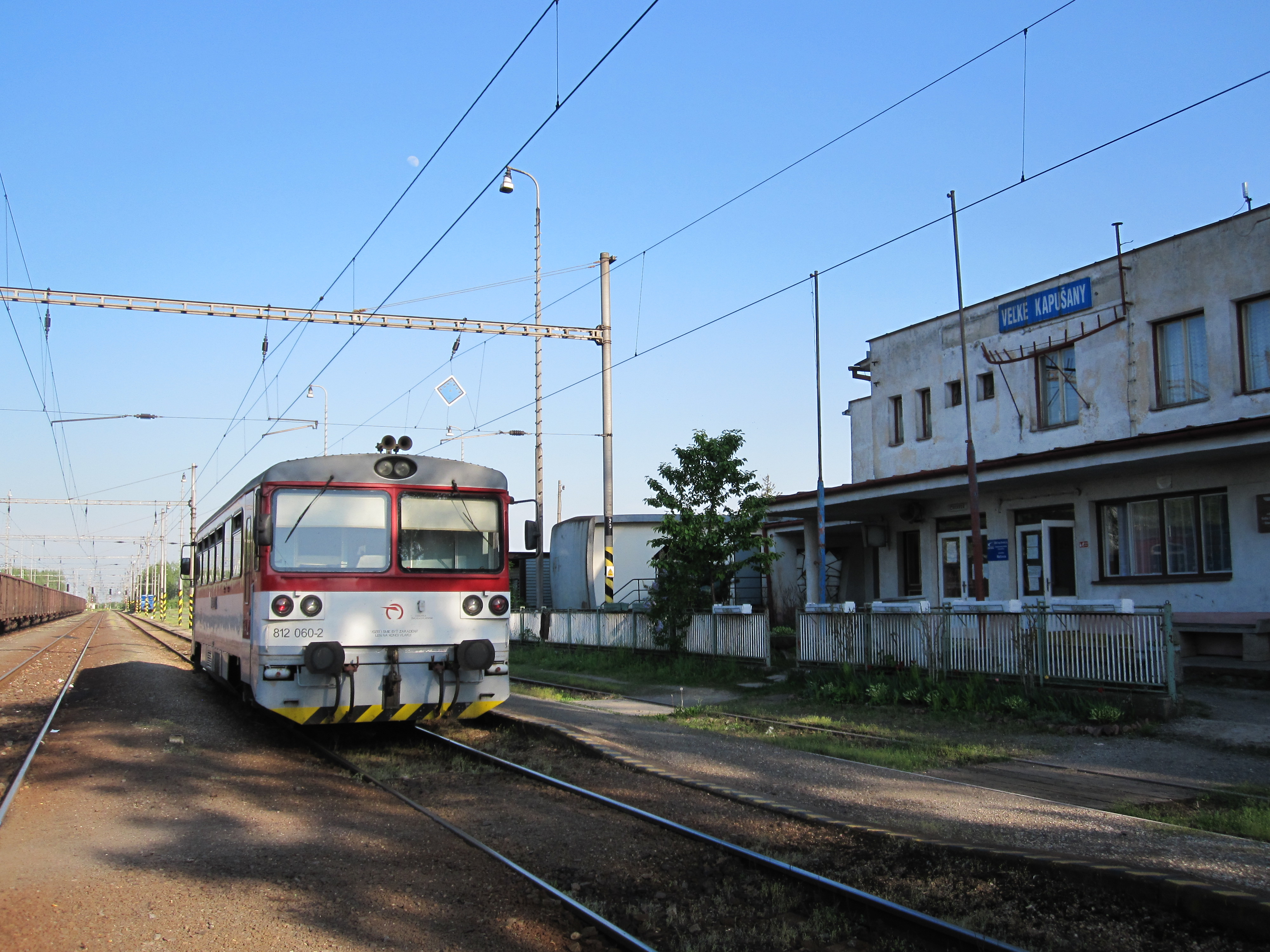
Veľké Kapušany train station, with a ZSSK Class 812 DMU

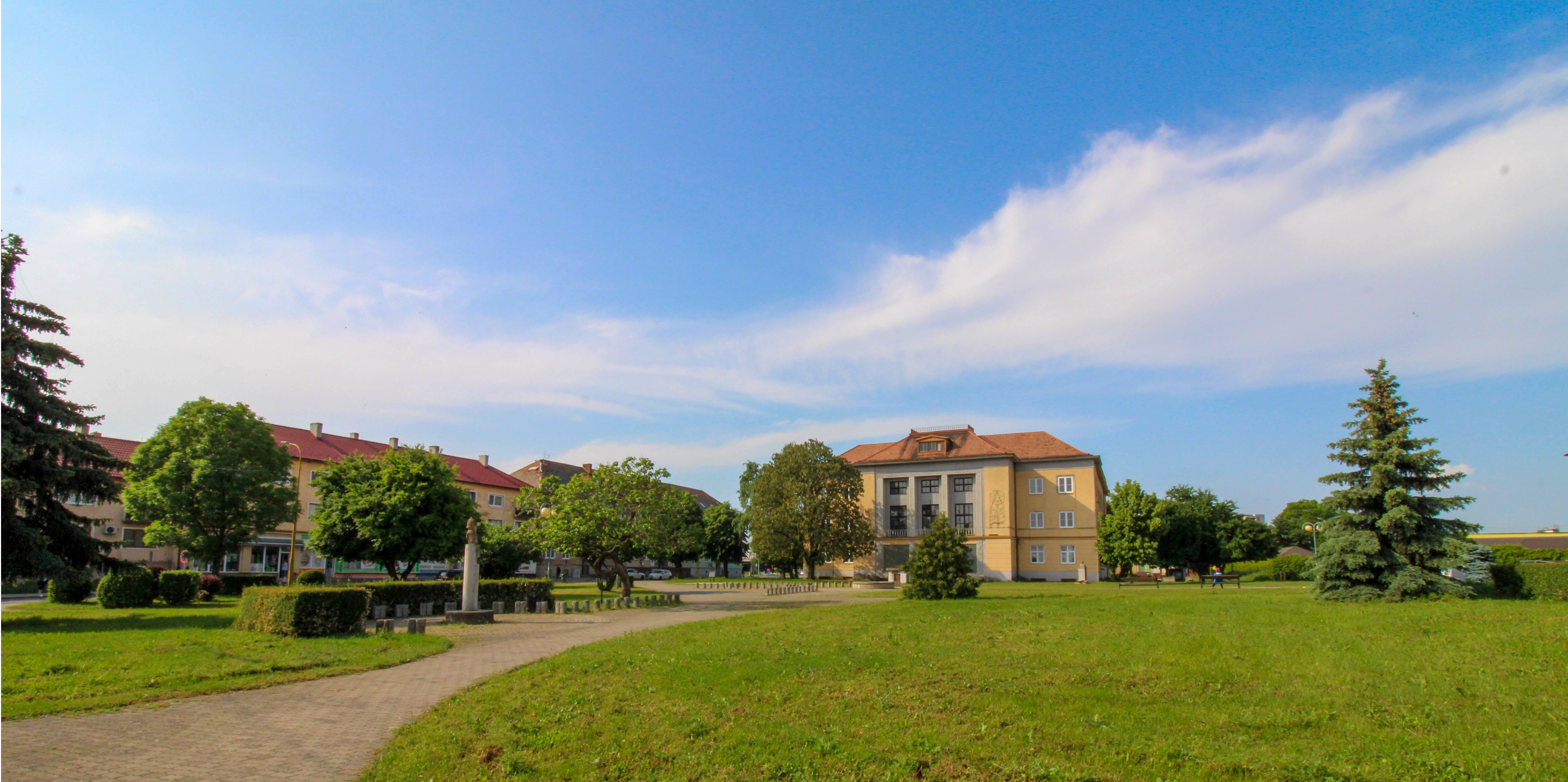
Dobó Square

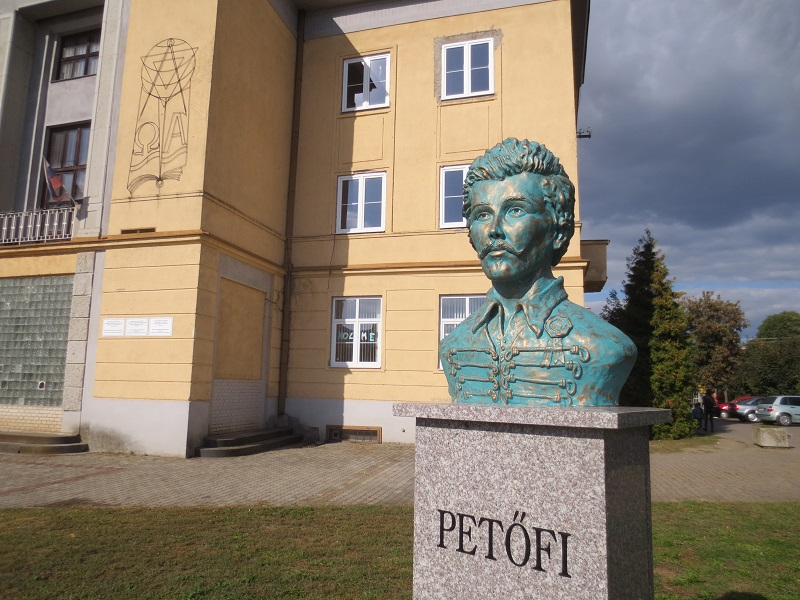
Memorial bust of Sándor Petöfi at Dobó Square

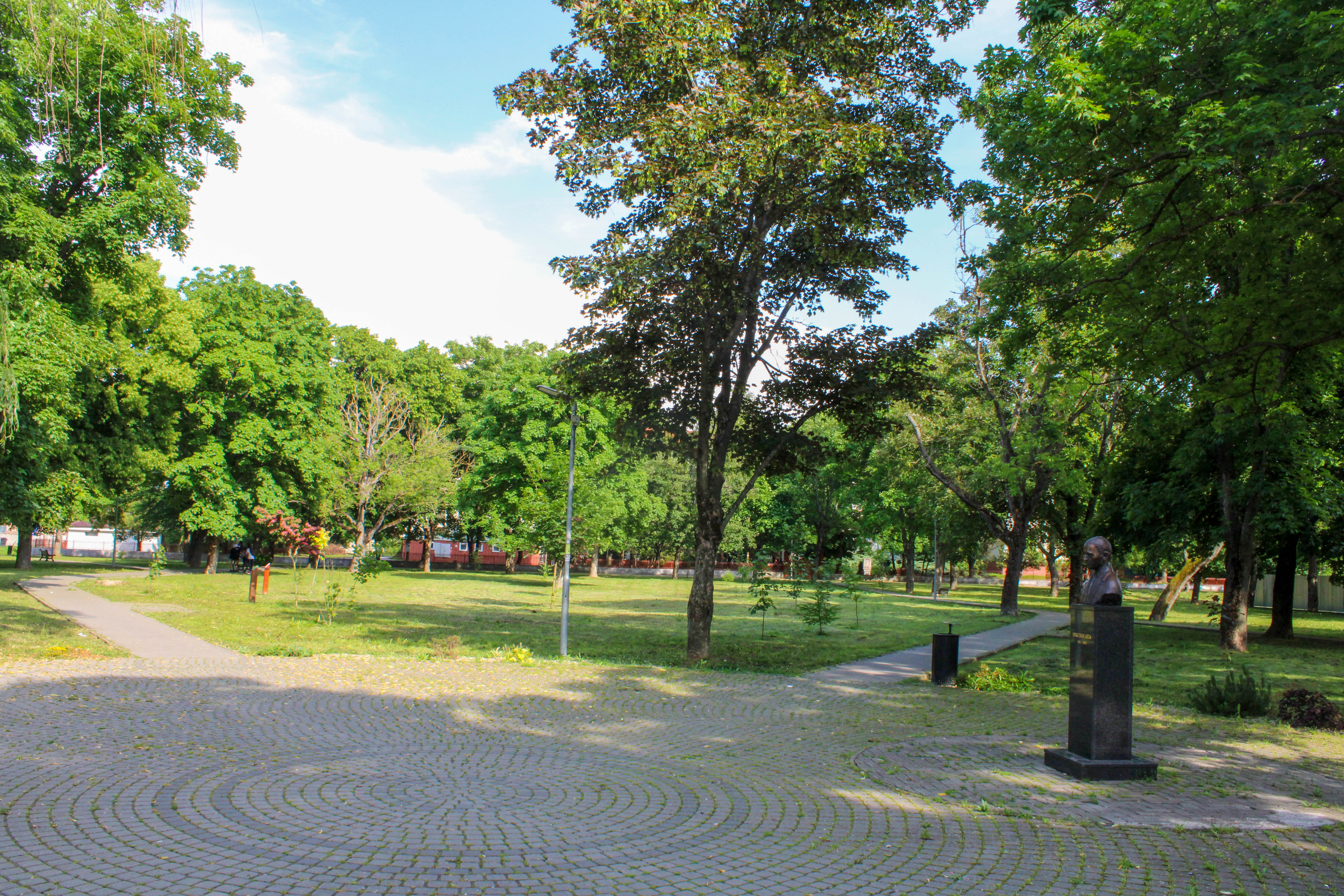
In 2018, a statue was unveiled in the city park in memory Géza Herczeg.

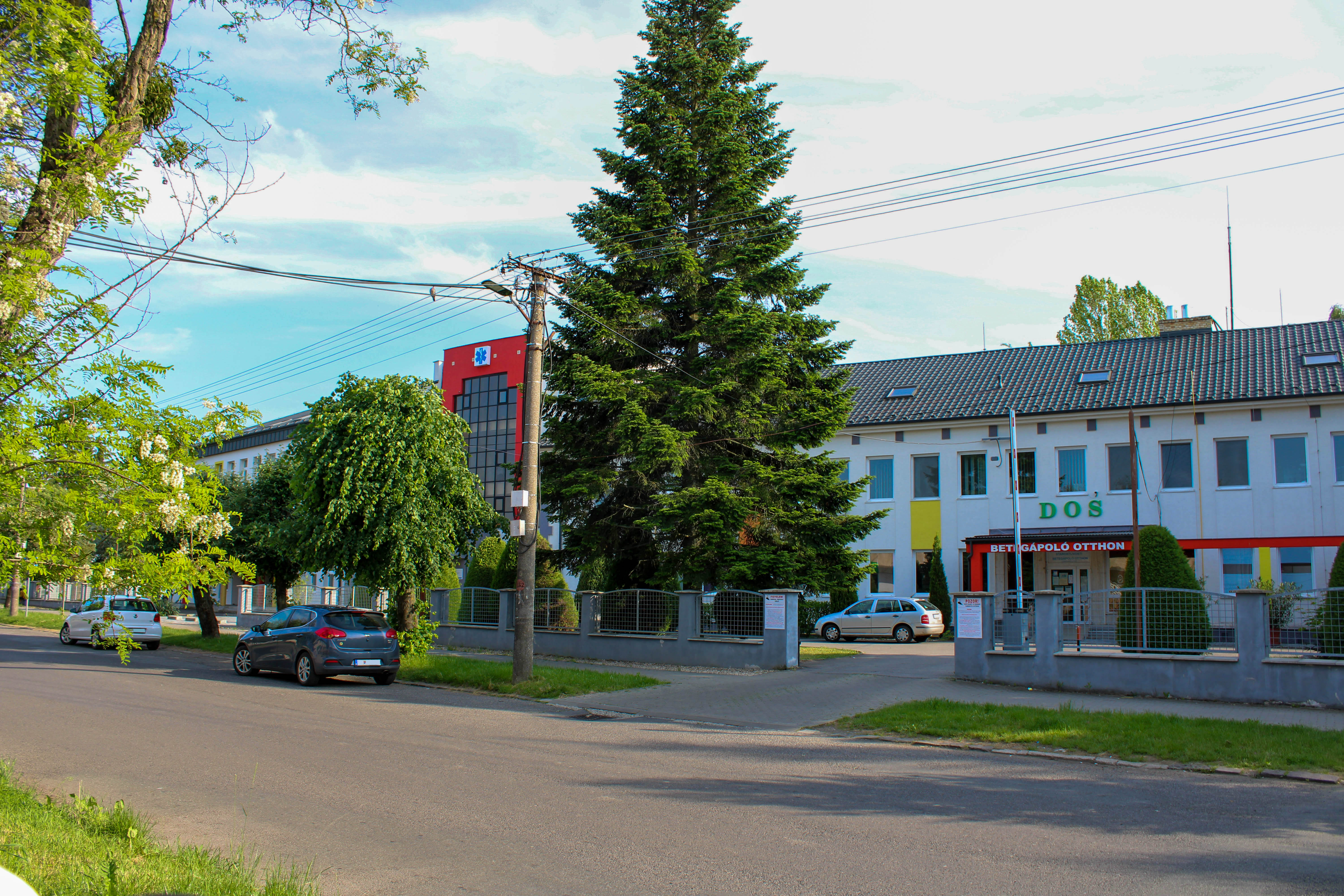
Medical Centre

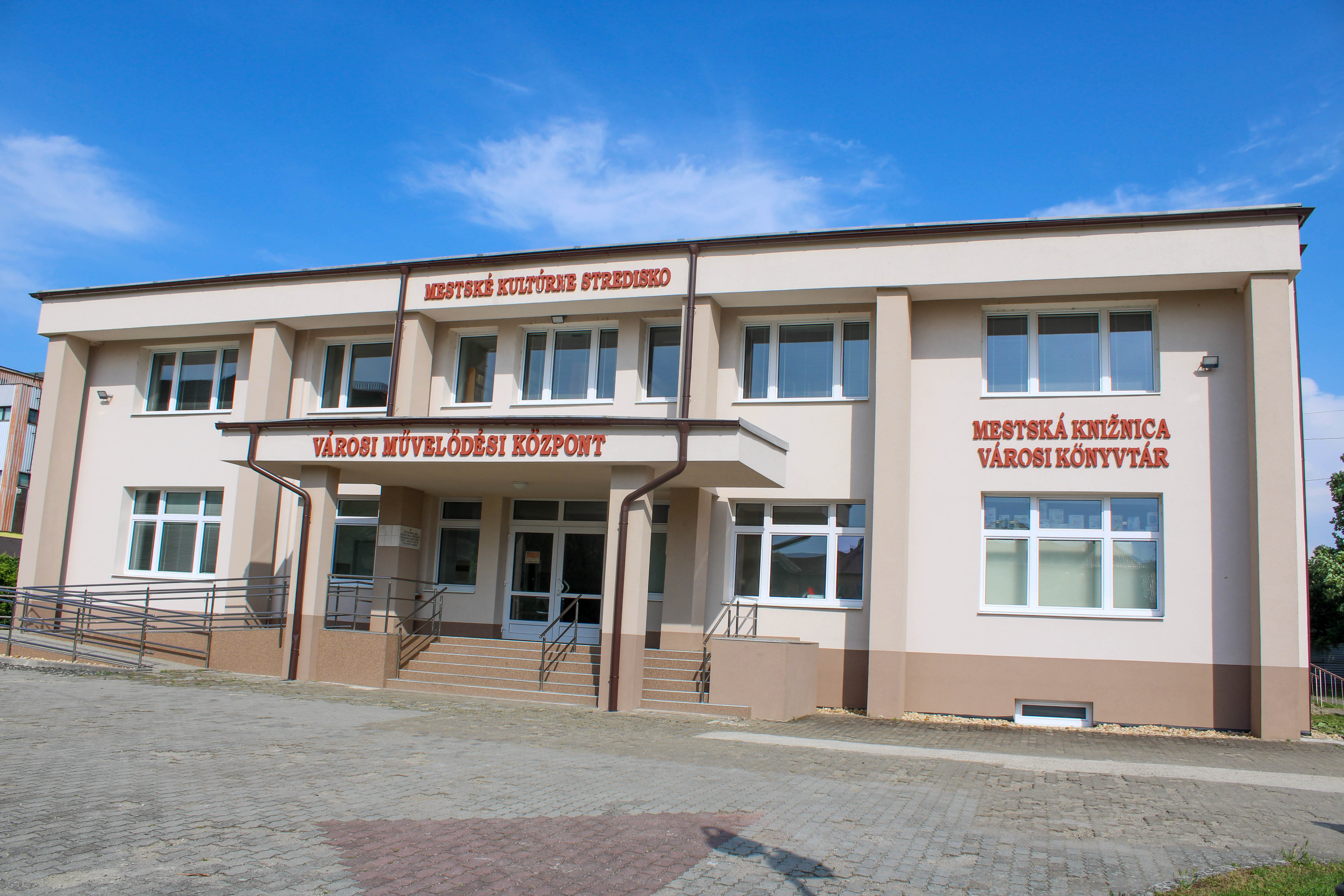
Municipal cultural community centre

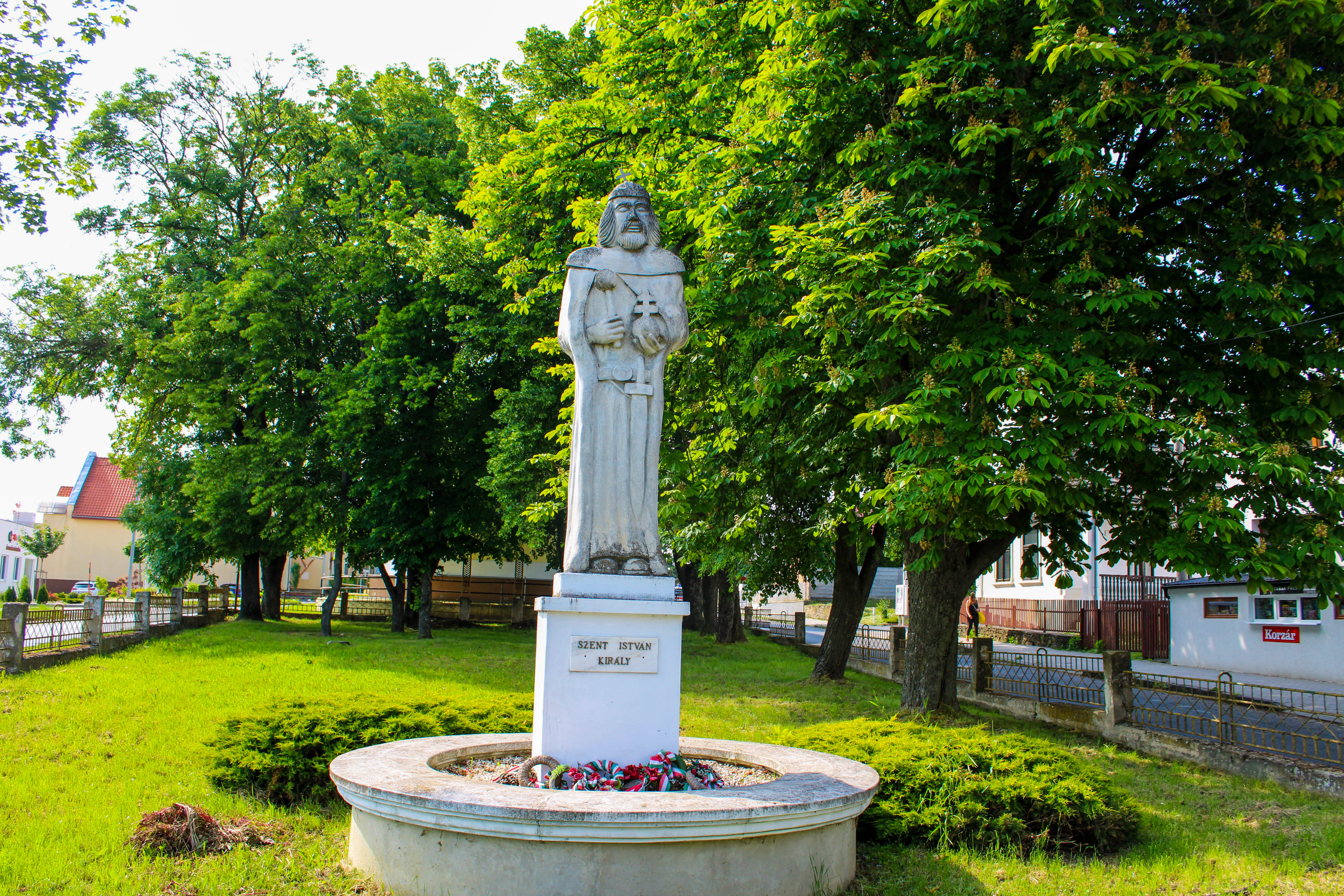
Saint Stephen statue. Created by sculptor Imre Bukóczy from Tokaj, it was unveiled in 2001.
