= Ung County =

County of the Kingdom of Hungary

Ung County Comitatus Unghvariensis (Latin) Ung vármegye (Hungarian) Komitat Ung (German) Ужаньска жупа (Rusyn) Užská župa (Slovak) Comitatul Ung (Romanian)
- County of the Kingdom of Hungary (11th century-1544); County of the Eastern Hungarian Kingdom (1544-1564); County of the Kingdom of Hungary (1564-1920, 1938-1945)
- Coat of arms

- Capital: Ungvár (now Uzhhorod)
- Area
  - Coordinates: 48°37′N 22°18′E
  - 1910: 3,230 km^{2} (1,250 sq mi)
- Population
  - 1910: 162,089
- History
  - Established: 11th century
  - Treaty of Trianon: 4 June 1920
  - Merged into Szabolcs-Ung County: 1923
  - County recreated (First Vienna Award): 2 November 1938
  - Disestablished: 1945
- Today part of: Ukraine (2,795 km^{2}) Slovakia (419 km^{2}) Hungary (16 km^{2})

Ung County (in Latin: comitatus Unghvariensis; Hungarian: Ung (vár)megye; also in Slovak: Užský komitát/ Užská župa / Užská stolica; Romanian: Comitatul Ung) was an administrative county (comitatus) of the Kingdom of Hungary. Its territory is now mostly in western Ukraine, a smaller part in eastern Slovakia, and a very small area in Hungary.

== Geography ==
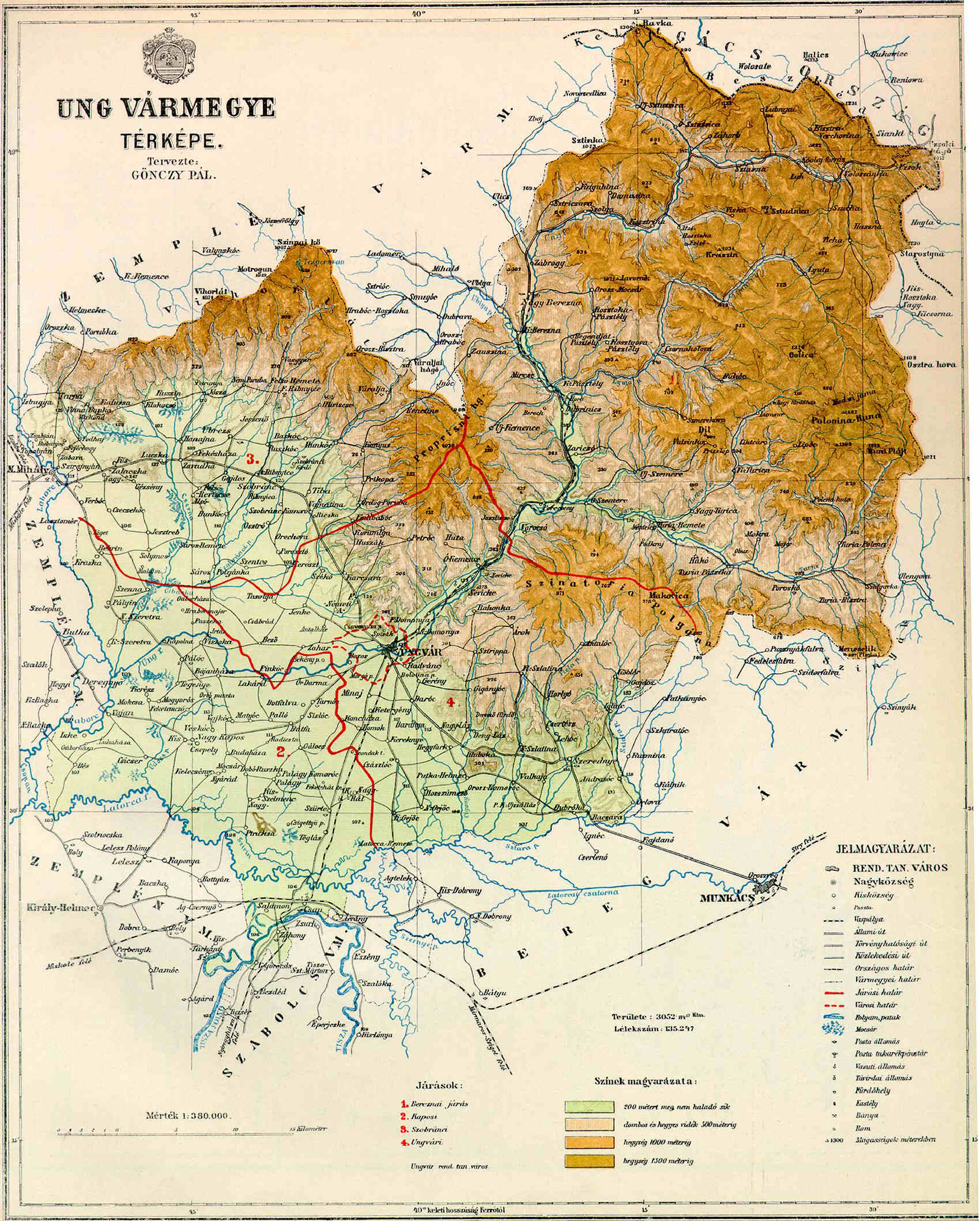
Map of Ung, 1891.

Ung county shared borders with the Cisleithanian crownland Galicia (now in Poland and Ukraine) and the Hungarian counties Bereg, Szabolcs and Zemplén. It was situated between the Carpathian Mountains in the north, the rivers Tisza and Latorca (present-day Latorica) in the south, and the river Laborc (present-day Laborec) in the west. The rivers Latorca and Ung (present-day Uzh) flowed through the county. Its area was 3,230 km^{2} (1,250 sq mi) around 1910.

== Capitals ==
Initially, the capital of the county was the Uzhhorod Castle (Hungarian: Ungvári vár), later the town of Ungvár (present-day Uzhhorod).

== History ==
Ung is one of the oldest counties of the Kingdom of Hungary. In the aftermath of World War I, most of Ung county became part of newly formed Czechoslovakia, as recognized by the concerned states in the 1920 Treaty of Trianon. The town of Záhony and the village of Győröcske remained in Hungary, which was merged into Szabolcs-Ung County in 1923.

Following the provisions of the First Vienna Award, all but the westernmost part of the county became part of Hungary again in November 1938, and the county was recreated. In 1939, following the annexation of the remainder of Carpathian Ruthenia after Czechoslovakia became abolished, the rest of the territories became part of Hungary again, however those were assigned to the administrative branch offices of Ung.

After World War II, as the 1920 borders were restored, the westernmost part was returned to Czechoslovakia. The rest (except Záhony and Győröcske) became part of the Soviet Union, Ukrainian SSR, Zakarpattia Oblast, while a small part remained in Hungary.

== Demographics ==
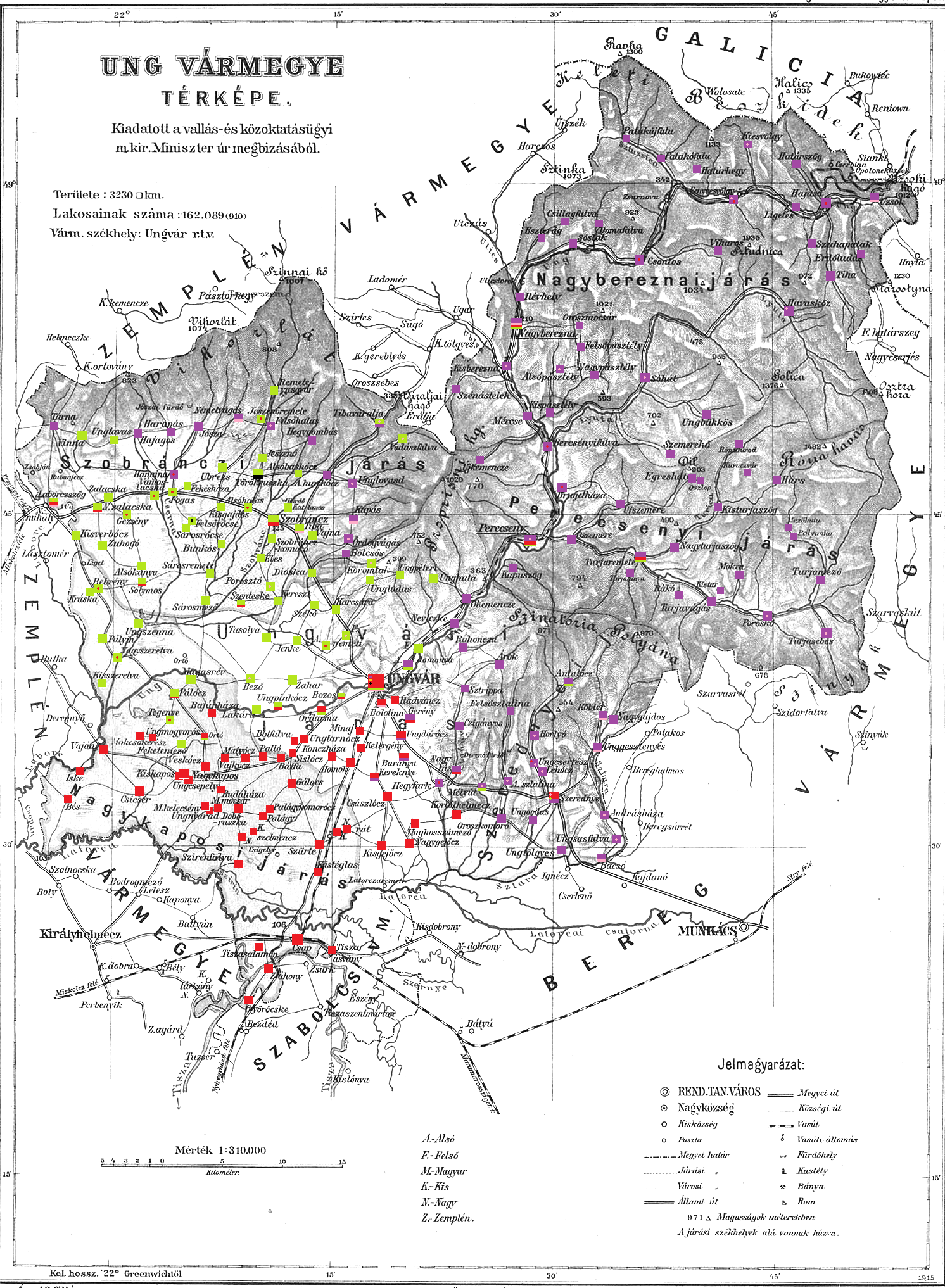
Ethnic map of the county with data of the 1910 census (see the key in the description).

Population by mother tongue (Note: Only linguistic communities > 1% are displayed.)
Census	Total	Ruthenian	Hungarian	Slovak	German	Other or unknown
1880	126,707	42,095 (34.25%)	39,479 (32.12%)	36,920 (30.04%)	3,614 (2.94%)	795 (0.65%)
1890	135,247	46,521 (34.40%)	37,182 (27.49%)	40,035 (29.60%)	10,318 (7.63%)	1,191 (0.88%)
1900	153,266	55,742 (36.37%)	46,306 (30.21%)	42,876 (27.97%)	7,099 (4.63%)	1,243 (0.81%)
1910	162,089	61,711 (38.07%)	53,824 (33.21%)	36,364 (22.43%)	8,383 (5.17%)	1,807 (1.11%)

Population by religion (Note: Only religious communities > 1% are displayed.)
Census	Total	Greek Catholic	Roman Catholic	Calvinist	Jewish	Other or unknown
1880	126,707	65,128 (51.40%)	27,466 (21.68%)	17,238 (13.60%)	16,423 (12.96%)	452 (0.36%)
1890	135,247	72,190 (53.38%)	28,836 (21.32%)	18,056 (13.35%)	15,599 (11.53%)	566 (0.42%)
1900	153,266	83,936 (54.76%)	32,904 (21.47%)	19,003 (12.40%)	16,776 (10.95%)	647 (0.42%)
1910	162,089	89,149 (55.00%)	34,549 (21.31%)	20,092 (12.40%)	17,587 (10.85%)	712 (0.44%)

== Subdivisions ==
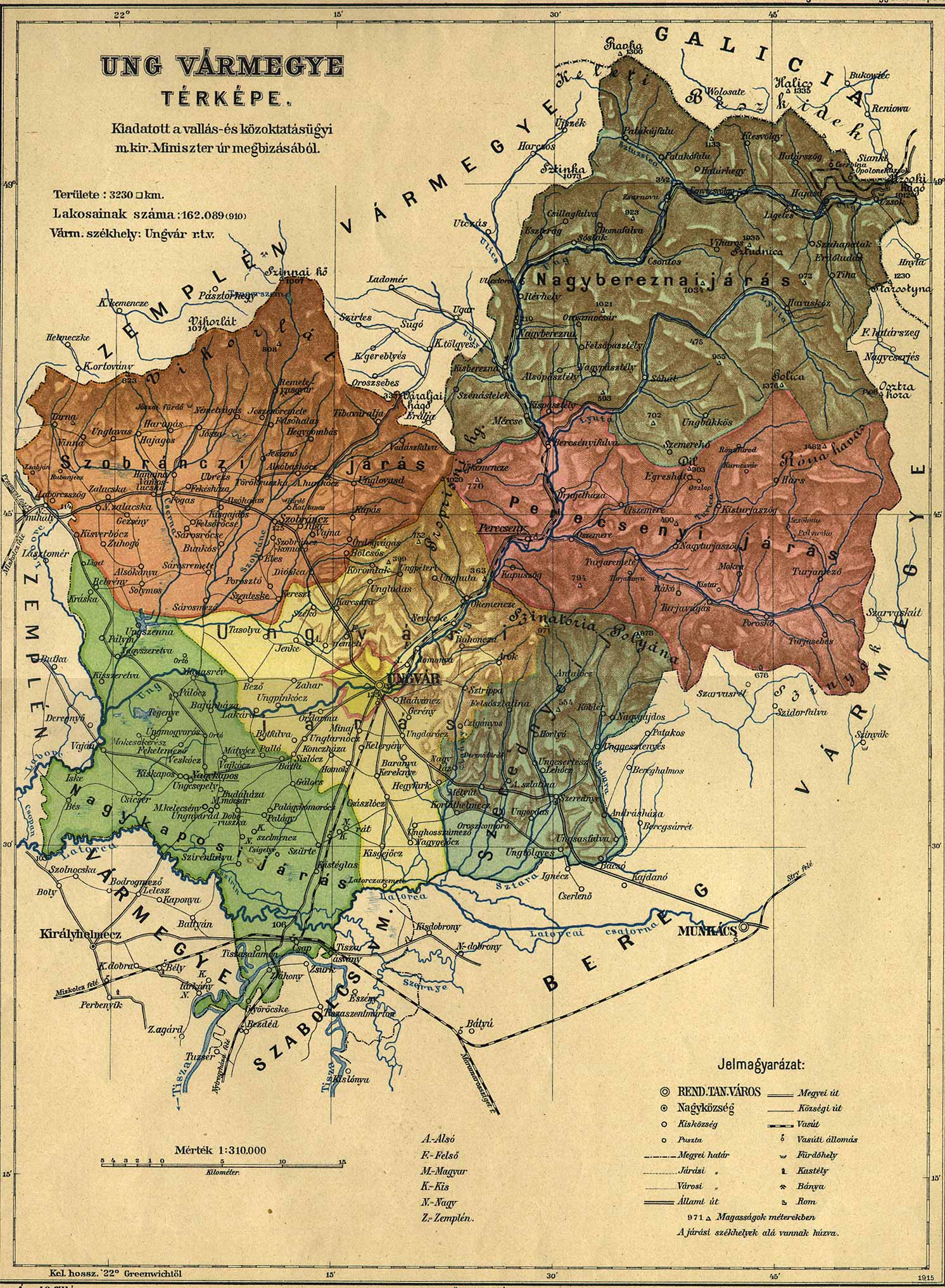

In the early 20th century, the subdivisions of Ung county were:

Districts (járás)
District	Capital
Nagyberezna	Nagyberezna (now Velykyi Bereznyi)
Nagykapos	Nagykapos (now Veľké Kapušany)
Perecseny	Perecseny (now Perechyn)
Szerednye	Szerednye (now Serednye)
Szobránc	Szobránc (now Sobrance)
Ungvár	Ungvár (now Uzhhorod)
Urban districts (rendezett tanácsú város)
Ungvár (now Uzhhorod)

The towns of Veľké Kapušany and Sobrance are now in Slovakia; the other towns mentioned are in Ukraine.
