= Drienovec =

Municipality of Slovakia

Drienovec Somodi
- Municipality
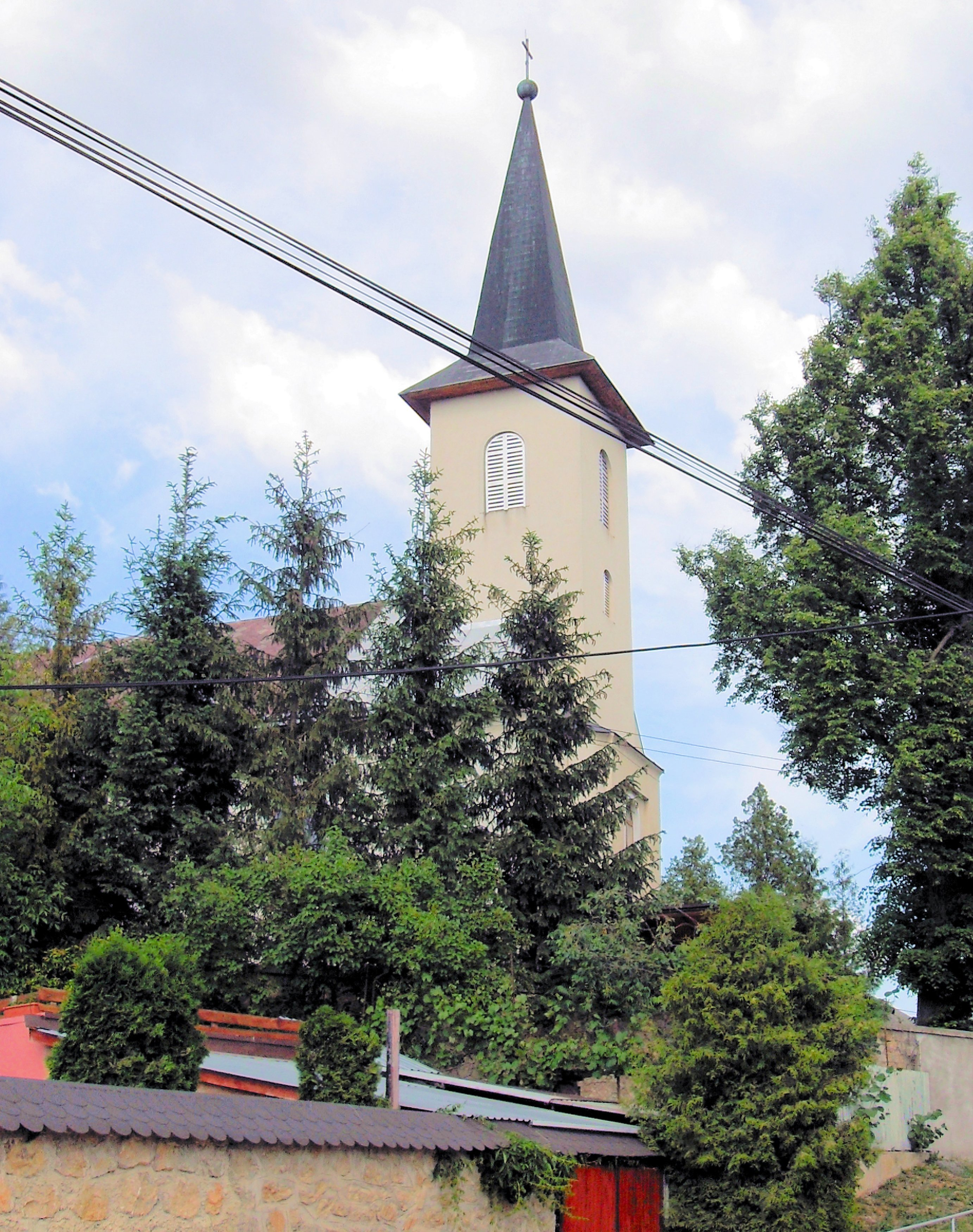

- Flag

- Location of Drienovec in the Košice Region Location of Drienovec in Slovakia
- Coordinates: 48.62°N 20.95°E
- Country: Slovakia
- Region: Košice Region
- District: Košice-okolie District
- First mentioned: 1335

Area
  - Total: 28.07 km^{2} (10.84 sq mi)
- Elevation: 188 m (617 ft)

Population (2025)
  - Total: 2,532
- Time zone: UTC+1 (CET)
  - Summer (DST): UTC+2 (CEST)
- Postal code: 440 1
- Area code: +421 55
- Vehicle registration plate (until 2022): KS
- Website: www.obecdrienovec.eu

Drienovec (Hungarian: Somodi) is a village and municipality in Košice-okolie District in the Kosice Region of eastern Slovakia.

== Geography ==
The municipality lies at an altitude of 188 metres (617 ft) and covers an area of 28.07 km^{2} (10.84 sq mi) (2025).

== Population ==
Population statistic (10 years)
Year	1995	2005	2015	2025
Count	1686	1787	2229	2532
Difference		+5.99%	+24.73%	+13.59%

Population statistic
Year	2024	2025
Count	2486	2532
Difference		+1.85%

It has a population of 2532 people (31 December 2025).

=== Ethnicity ===
Census 2021 (1+ %)
Ethnicity	Number	Fraction
Slovak	1261	53.29%
Hungarian	485	20.49%
Not found out	397	16.77%
Romani	378	15.97%
Total	2366	

In year 2021 was 2366 people by ethnicity 1261 as Slovak, 485 as Hungarian, 397 as Not found out, 378 as Romani, 7 as Jewish, 4 as Other, 3 as Czech, 3 as French, 2 as Rusyn, 2 as German, 1 as Irish, 1 as Ukrainian, 1 as Italian and 1 as Russian.

Note on population: The difference values of population numbers in the table "Population statistic" and in the sections "Ethnicity" & "Religion" is caused by the use of various statistical methods.

=== Religion ===
Census 2021 (1+ %)
Religion	Number	Fraction
Roman Catholic Church	1719	72.65%
Not found out	383	16.19%
None	168	7.1%
Greek Catholic Church	32	1.35%
Calvinist Church	29	1.23%
Total	2366	

In year 2021 was 2366 people by religion 1719 from Roman Catholic Church, 383 from Not found out, 168 from None, 32 from Greek Catholic Church, 29 from Calvinist Church, 11 from Evangelical Church, 8 from Jewish community, 7 from Jehovah's Witnesses, 3 from Eastern Orthodox Church, 3 from Other, 2 from Ad hoc movements and 1 from Paganism and natural spirituality.

== Genealogical resources ==
The records for genealogical research are available at the state archive "Statny Archiv in Kosice, Slovakia"

- Roman Catholic church records (births/marriages/deaths): 1859-1891 (parish A)
- Reformated church records (births/marriages/deaths): 1727-1904 (parish B)

== See also ==
- List of municipalities and towns in Slovakia
