= Bertotovce =

- Municipality
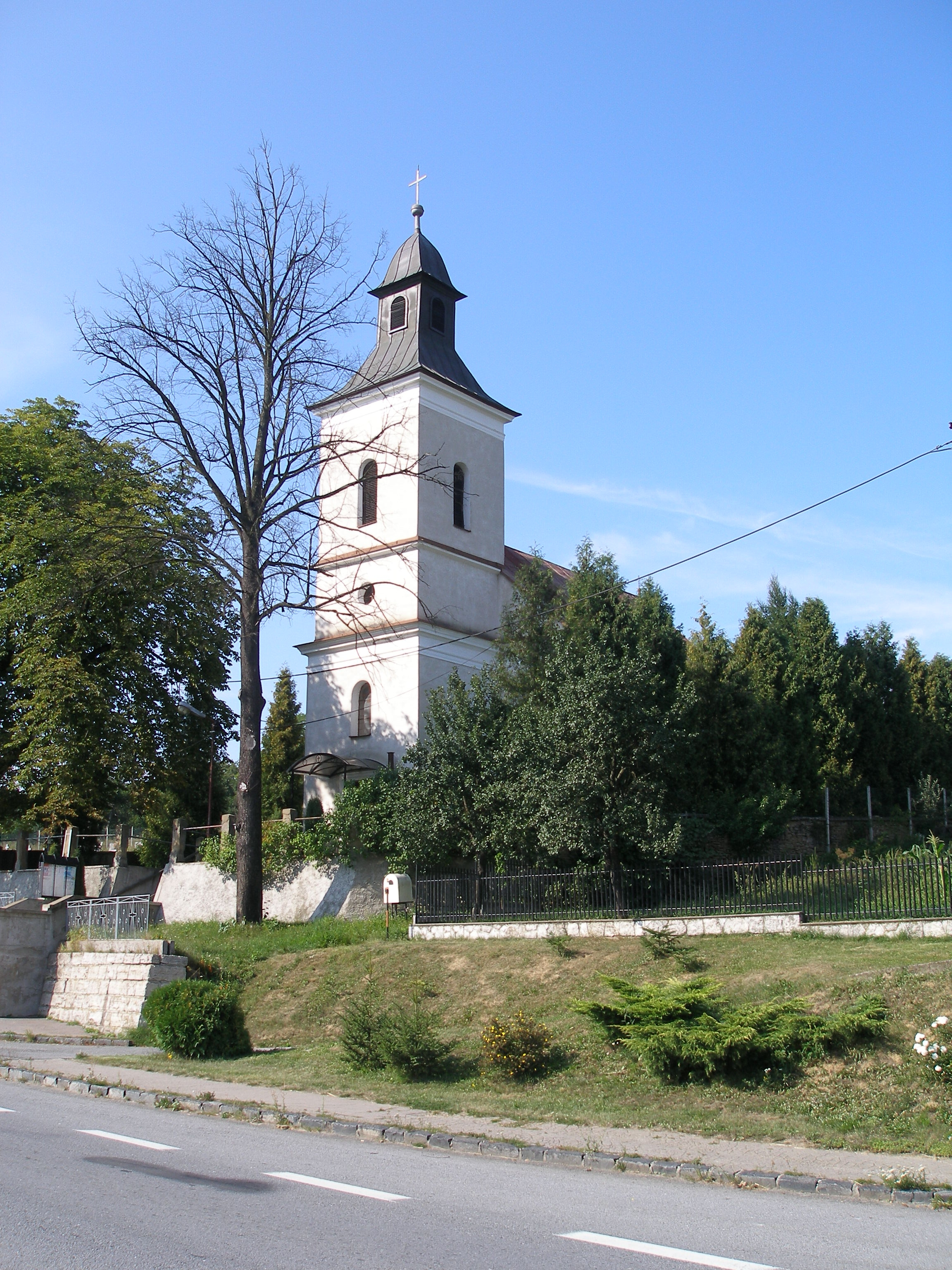

- Flag

- Location of Bertotovce in the Prešov Region Location of Bertotovce in Slovakia
- Coordinates: 49.02°N 21.03°E
- Country: Slovakia
- Region: Prešov Region
- District: Prešov District
- First mentioned: 1320

Area
  - Total: 8.49 km^{2} (3.28 sq mi)
- Elevation: 408 m (1,339 ft)

Population (2025)
  - Total: 518
- Time zone: UTC+1 (CET)
  - Summer (DST): UTC+2 (CEST)
- Postal code: 823 5
- Area code: +421 51
- Vehicle registration plate (until 2022): PO
- Website: bertotovce.sk

Bertotovce (Hungarian: Bertót; Rusyn: Бертотовце) is a village and municipality in Prešov District in the Prešov Region of eastern Slovakia. The municipality lies at an altitude of 419 metres (1,375 ft) and covers an area of 8.49 square kilometres (3.28 sq mi).

== Geography ==
The municipality lies at an altitude of 408 metres (1,339 ft) and covers an area of 8.49 km^{2} (3.28 sq mi) (2025).

== Population ==
Population statistic (10 years)
Year	1995	2005	2015	2025
Count	443	487	487	518
Difference		+9.93%	+0%	+6.36%

Population statistic
Year	2024	2025
Count	520	518
Difference		−0.38%

It has a population of 518 people (31 December 2025).

=== Ethnicity ===
Census 2021 (1+ %)
Ethnicity	Number	Fraction
Slovak	488	95.68%
Not found out	21	4.11%
Total	510	

In year 2021 was 510 people by ethnicity 488 as Slovak, 21 as Not found out, 2 as Czech and 1 as Rusyn.

Note on population: The difference values of population numbers in the table "Population statistic" and in the sections "Ethnicity" & "Religion" is caused by the use of various statistical methods.

=== Religion ===
Census 2021 (1+ %)
Religion	Number	Fraction
Roman Catholic Church	462	90.59%
Not found out	18	3.53%
Evangelical Church	13	2.55%
None	8	1.57%
Total	510	

In year 2021 was 510 people by religion 462 from Roman Catholic Church, 18 from Not found out, 13 from Evangelical Church, 8 from None, 4 from Eastern Orthodox Church, 4 from Greek Catholic Church and 1 from Christian Congregations in Slovakia.

== Genealogical resources ==
The records for genealogical research are available at the state archive "Statny Archiv in Presov, Slovakia"

- Roman Catholic church records (births/marriages/deaths): 1788–1895 (parish B)
- Greek Catholic church records (births/marriages/deaths): 1834–1895 (parish B)
- Lutheran church records (births/marriages/deaths): 1753–1895 (parish B)

== See also ==
- List of municipalities and towns in Slovakia
