= Hankovce =

Hankovce may refer to:

- Hankovce, Humenné in Humenné District, Slovakia
- Hankovce, Bardejov in Bardejov District, Slovakia
