= Hankovce, Humenné District =

Hankovce
- Municipality
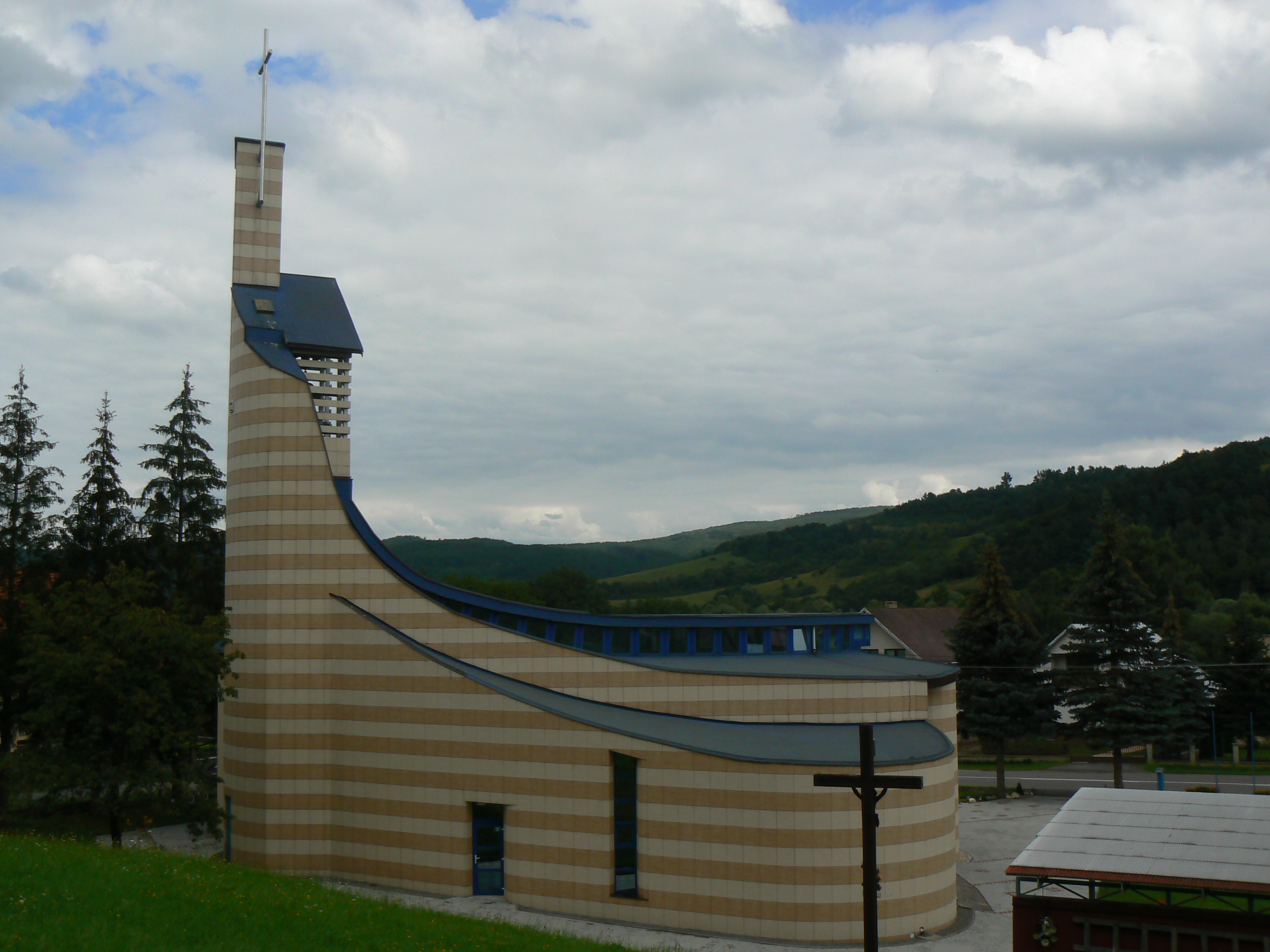
- Church in Hankovce

- Flag

- Location of Hankovce in the Prešov Region Location of Hankovce in Slovakia
- Coordinates: 49.03°N 21.95°E
- Country: Slovakia
- Region: Prešov Region
- District: Humenné District
- First mentioned: 1567

Area
  - Total: 8.54 km^{2} (3.30 sq mi)
- Elevation: 182 m (597 ft)

Population (2025)
  - Total: 496
- Time zone: UTC+1 (CET)
  - Summer (DST): UTC+2 (CEST)
- Postal code: 671 2
- Area code: +421 57
- Vehicle registration plate (until 2022): HE
- Website: www.obechankovce.sk

Hankovce is a village and municipality in Humenné District in the Prešov Region of north-east Slovakia.

== History ==
In historical records the village was first mentioned in 1567.

== Geography ==
The municipality lies at an altitude of 182 metres (597 ft) and covers an area of 8.54 km^{2} (3.30 sq mi) (2025).

== Population ==
Population statistic (10 years)
Year	1995	2005	2015	2025
Count	568	566	532	496
Difference		−0.35%	−6.00%	−6.76%

Population statistic
Year	2024	2025
Count	487	496
Difference		+1.84%

It has a population of 496 people (31 December 2025).

=== Ethnicity ===
Census 2021 (1+ %)
Ethnicity	Number	Fraction
Slovak	500	99.4%
Rusyn	10	1.98%
Total	503	

In year 2021 was 503 people by ethnicity 500 as Slovak, 10 as Rusyn, 3 as Not found out, 2 as Czech and 1 as Other.

Note on population: The difference values of population numbers in the table "Population statistic" and in the sections "Ethnicity" & "Religion" is caused by the use of various statistical methods.

=== Religion ===
Census 2021 (1+ %)
Religion	Number	Fraction
Roman Catholic Church	474	94.23%
Greek Catholic Church	16	3.18%
None	6	1.19%
Total	503	

In year 2021 was 503 people by religion 474 from Roman Catholic Church, 16 from Greek Catholic Church, 6 from None, 3 from Eastern Orthodox Church, 2 from Not found out, 1 from Calvinist Church and 1 from Other.

== Genealogical resources ==
The records for genealogical research are available at the state archive "Statny Archiv in Presov, Slovakia"

- Roman Catholic church records (births/marriages/deaths): 1786-1895 (parish B)
- Greek Catholic church records (births/marriages/deaths): 1770-1902 (parish B)

== See also ==
- List of municipalities and towns in Slovakia
