= Poloniny Dark-Sky Park =

Dark sky park in Slovakia

Coordinates: 49°02′N 22°22′E

- Perseids 2021 over Poloniny
- Interactive map of Poloniny Dark-Sky Park
- Established: 3 December 2010
- Website: poloniny.svetelneznecistenie.sk

Poloniny Dark-Sky Park (Slovak: Park tmavej oblohy Poloniny) is the first dark sky park in Slovakia. It became the 20th dark sky park in the world. Natural total night darkness, which would be unaffected by artificial light, no longer exists in Slovakia because of light pollution, but there are still places where this influence is minimal. Such a place is the Poloniny National Park, which is in terms of light pollution the darkest area in Slovakia. Therefore, the Slovak Union of Astronomers started an initiative to establish a dark sky park there.

== Location and area ==
Poloniny Dark-Sky Park is located in the northeast of the Slovak Republic on the border with Poland and Ukraine. The territory of the park itself is defined by area of the Poloniny National Park (298.05 km^{2}) and a buffer zone (109.73 km^{2}) and municipal territories of Kolonica, Ladomirov, Kalná Roztoka, Klenová, Ruská Volová (77.41 km^{2}). The total area is 485.19 km^{2}. Area of the park is characterized by having an exceptionally small population density (6 inhabitants per km^{2}). It is also the least visited national park in Slovakia, so the human impact on the environment is minimal. In terms of light pollution, Poloniny National Park is the darkest area in Slovakia. Natural night darkness and night biorhythms of all living organisms are disturbed the least there.

== Establishment ==
Poloniny Dark-Sky Park was officially declared on 3 December 2010, in Snina. It was established on the occasion of the International Year of Biodiversity 2010 as the first dark sky area in Slovakia. Poloniny Dark-Sky Park was declared by agreement of six partner organizations.

== Goals ==
Poloniny Dark-Sky Park was created to inform the public about the exceptionally preserved night environment in this area, to educate on the issue of protection of the environment against light pollution, to promote and protect the dark night sky, which is the basis of protecting the natural environment from light pollution. The Milky Way is perfectly visible, without a telescope nearly 2,000 stars can be seen. Mountains preclude direct visibility of lights from the surrounding towns and villages. There is also a professional astronomical observatory located within the park.

== See also ==
- Poloniny National Park
- Beskydy Dark-Sky Park
- Transcarpathian Dark-Sky Park
- Bieszczady Starry-Sky Park
- Dark-sky preserve
