= Snina =

- Town
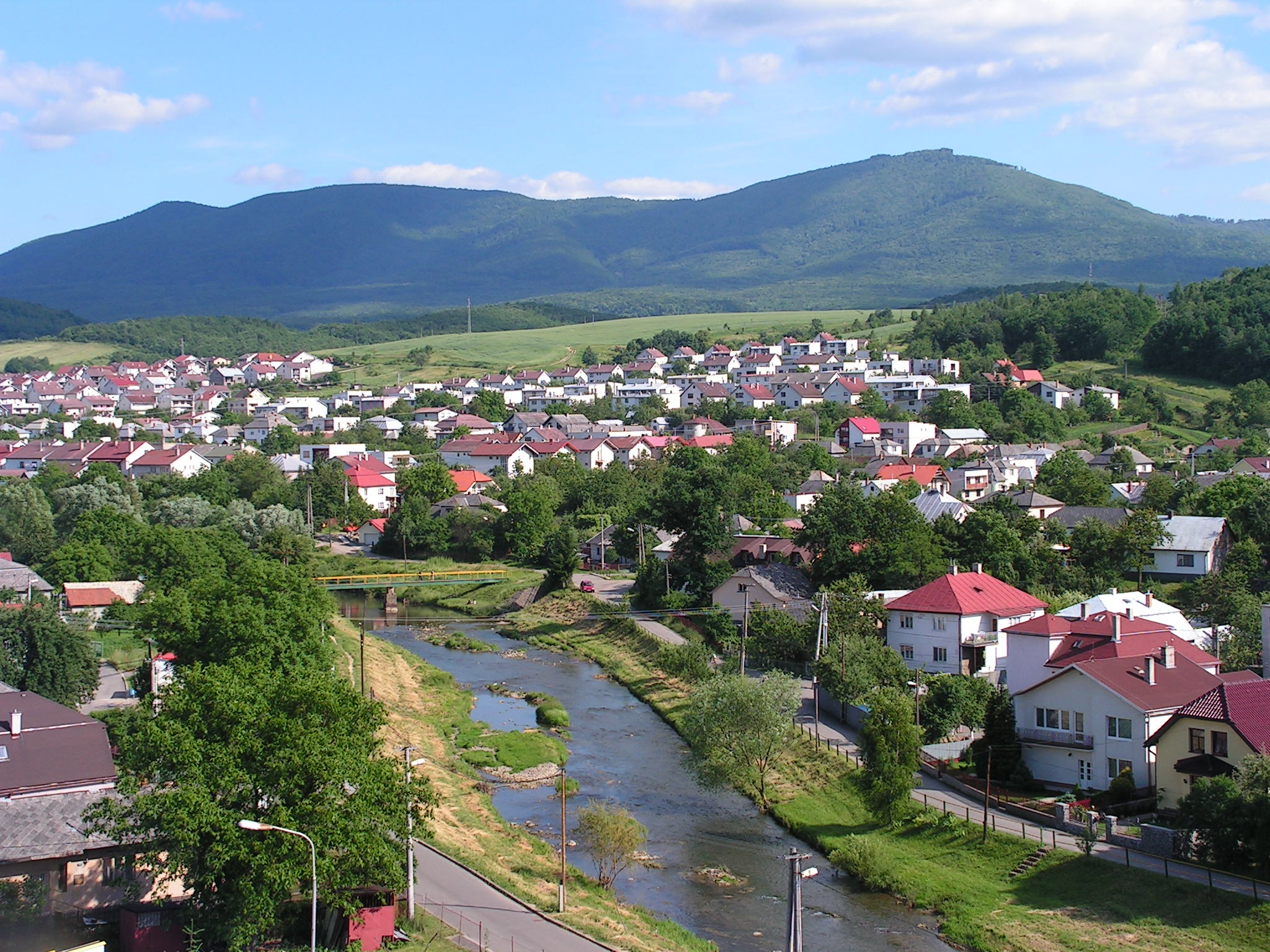
- View of Snina with Vihorlat Mountains in the background

- Flag Coat of arms

- Location of Snina in the Prešov Region Location of Snina in Slovakia
- Coordinates: 48°59′17″N 22°09′24″E
- Country: Slovakia
- Region: Prešov
- District: Snina
- First mentioned: 1317

Government
  - Mayor: Peter Vološin

Area
  - Total: 58.61 km^{2} (22.63 sq mi)
- (2022)
- Elevation: 216 m (709 ft)

Population (2025)
  - Total: 17,612
- Time zone: UTC+1 (CET)
  - Summer (DST): UTC+2 (CEST)
- Postal code: 069 01
- Area code: +421 57
- Vehicle registration plate (until 2022): SV
- Website: www.snina.sk

Snina (Hungarian: Szinna, Rusyn: Снина) is a town in Slovakia located at the confluence of the Cirocha river and the small river Pčolinka in the valley between the Bukovec Mountains foothills and the Vihorlat Mountains. It is the closest town with rail and bus connections to Poloniny National Park.

== Geography ==
The municipality lies at an altitude of 216 metres (709 ft) and covers an area of 58.61 km^{2} (22.63 sq mi) (2025).

== History ==
The oldest written records mentioning Snina date back to 1317. Snina as an oppidum (small town) is mentioned in port records ("porta" means the gate into a courtyard) beginning in 1585. In 1598 the first census of houses was made and there were 75 houses in the town at that time. Between 1570 and 1630, it is evident from port records that Snina was the seat of the regional krajňa, or administrative district for the surrounding villages. In 1646 Snina was called "Szinna Varossa" and later "Civitas Szinna" in the archives. In 1785 Snina had 195 houses and 1,430 inhabitants.

The town's rulers from 1321 to 1684 were from the Drugeth family, who came from Salerno near Naples. Later, the owner of the lordship of Snina was Terézia van Dernáthová, who was the granddaughter of Žigmung Drugeth. After her death in 1799, her five sons sold all the property to a businessman from Gemer named Jozef Rholl. His children developed the region until 1857. They built an iron and steel works in the Jozef valley in 1809.

Starting in 1839 a traditional market took place in Snina four times a year, which aided the development of business and trade. An iron foundry was built in the Jozef valley in 1841. A well-known moulded statue of Hercules was placed next to the Snina manor-house and is the emblem of Snina to this day. During a decline in business in 1873, the iron and steel works completely vanished, so life for the citizens of Snina and its vicinity worsened rapidly and large-scale migration began. They left their homes and went to the United States, Canada and western Europe.

In 1876 Snina was a residence of the 10th region of the Zemplín area. The Roman Catholic classicist church from 1751 was modified at the beginning of the 19th century. A classicist Calvary in the cemetery dates from 1847, and features the Chapel of Virgin Mary. There is a manor-house from 1800 in the town set in a planned historical park, which is from the 19th century. In the courtyard of the manor-house is a public fountain with a well-known statue of Hercules from 1841. In the church's park there are monuments from World War II. There are also two military cemeteries from World War I near the town (Giglov has 130 graves of soldiers and Brehy has 153).

Before the establishment of independent Czechoslovakia in 1918, Snina was part of Zemplén County within the Kingdom of Hungary. From 1939 to 1944 it was part of the Slovak Republic. On 25 November 1944 the Red Army entered Snina and it was again part of Czechoslovakia.

On May 1, 1949, construction of the Vihorlat Enterprise began, and production started on July 15, 1951. The construction and extension of the enterprise, which was aimed at medium heavy engineering production, created further employment opportunities in construction organisations, services and trade.

Along with the development of industry and services, housing developed. Housing estates and new family houses were constructed. The largest number of flats and family houses were built here between 1975 and 1990 for families displaced by the construction of the Starina reservoir, when the inhabitants of seven villages had to be moved out.

== Population ==
Historical population
Year	Pop.	±%
1970	9,979	—
1980	13,347	+33.8%
1991	19,170	+43.6%
2001	21,325	+11.2%
2011	20,723	−2.8%
2021	18,712	−9.7%
Source: Censuses

Population statistic (10 years)
Year	1995	2005	2015	2025
Count	20,757	21,326	20,174	17,612
Difference		+2.74%	−5.40%	−12.69%

Population statistic
Year	2024	2025
Count	17,879	17,612
Difference		−1.49%

It has a population of 17,612 people (31 December 2025).

=== Ethnicity ===
Census 2021 (1+ %)
Ethnicity	Number	Fraction
Slovak	16,067	85.86%
Rusyn	3228	17.25%
Not found out	1566	8.36%
Romani	370	1.97%
Ukrainian	217	1.15%
Total	18,712	

In year 2021 was 18,712 people by ethnicity 16,067 as Slovak, 3228 as Rusyn, 1566 as Not found out, 370 as Romani, 217 as Ukrainian, 100 as Czech, 85 as Other, 28 as Hungarian, 20 as Polish, 18 as Russian, 9 as Italian, 9 as German, 8 as Vietnamese, 6 as English, 3 as Serbian, 2 as Jewish, 2 as Irish, 2 as Turkish, 2 as Moravian, 2 as French, 2 as Croatian, 1 as Canadian, 1 as Bulgarian and 1 as Albanian.

Note on population: The difference values of population numbers in the table "Population statistic" and in the sections "Ethnicity" & "Religion" is caused by the use of various statistical methods.

=== Religion ===
Census 2021 (1+ %)
Religion	Number	Fraction
Roman Catholic Church	9296	49.68%
Greek Catholic Church	3265	17.45%
Eastern Orthodox Church	2311	12.35%
None	1760	9.41%
Not found out	1689	9.03%
Total	18,712	

In year 2021 was 18,712 people by religion 9296 from Roman Catholic Church, 3265 from Greek Catholic Church, 2311 from Eastern Orthodox Church, 1760 from None, 1689 from Not found out, 134 from Jehovah's Witnesses, 65 from Evangelical Church, 54 from Ad hoc movements, 44 from Other and not ascertained christian church, 23 from Other, 17 from Islam, 16 from Calvinist Church, 15 from Christian Congregations in Slovakia, 6 from Buddhism, 5 from Paganism and natural spirituality, 3 from Jewish community, 3 from Church of the Brethren, 3 from Apostolic Church, 1 from Seventh-day Adventist Church, 1 from Church of Jesus Christ of Latter-day Saints and 1 from Baptists Church.

== Twin towns — sister cities ==
Snina is twinned with:

- Boguchwała, Poland
- Khust, Ukraine
- Kremenchuk, Ukraine
- Lesko, Poland
- Prague 4, Czech Republic
- Seferihisar, Turkey
- Tokaj, Hungary
- Žarošice, Czech Republic

== Surroundings ==
Sninský kameň (1,005 m), the most visited mountain of the Vihorlat mountain range, is located 5 km (3.11 mi) from Snina. It is a protected natural formation which dominates the southern sky-line. This rock formation consists of two andesite blocks. The nearby surroundings abound in rare endemic flora. Marked trails from Snina lead to the top.

Morské oko is a lake located in the Vihorlat Mountains in the east of Slovakia.

Beautiful wooden churches can be found in several villages of the Snina region: Ruský Potok, Uličské Krivé, Kalná Roztoka, Topoľa and Hrabová Roztoka.

A ski-lift in Parihuzovce is 14 km (8.70 mi) from Snina.

On Magurica Mountain, there is a broadcasting tower of non-standard design. It is a 104 metres tall lattice tower with hexagonal cross section.

== See also ==
- List of municipalities and towns in Slovakia
