= Szirtes =

Szirtes is a Hungarian surname. It is a Hungarian name of Strihovce, Slovakia. Notable people with the surname include:

- Ádám Szirtes (1925–1989), Hungarian actor
- George Szirtes (born 1948), Hungarian-British poet and translator
- László Szirtes (1904–1959), Hungarian film producer
