= Ulic =

Ulic may refer to:

- Ulič, a village and municipality in Slovakia
- Ulic Qel-Droma, a Jedi/Sith Star Wars character in the Tales of the Jedi series
