= Prislop =

Prislop may refer to:

== Romania ==
=== Villages ===
- Prislop, Cornereva, a village in Cornereva Commune, Caraș-Severin County
- Prislop, Dalboșeț, a village in Dalboșeț Commune, Caraș-Severin County
- Prislop, Boiu Mare, a village in Boiu Mare Commune, Maramureș County
- Prislop, Rășinari, a village in Rășinari Commune, Sibiu County
- Prislop, the former name of Liviu Rebreanu village in Năsăud town, Bistrița-Năsăud County

=== Other locations in Romania ===
- Prislop (river), a tributary of the Doftana in Prahova County
- Prislop Pass
- Prislop Monastery, a 16th-century monastery in Hunedoara County
- Prislop, a tributary of the Lăpuș in Maramureș County

== Slovakia ==
- Príslop, in Snina District
