= Klenova =

Klenova or Klenová may refer to:

- Klenová (Snina District), a municipality and village in Slovakia
- Klenová (Klatovy District), a municipality and village in the Czech Republic
  - Klenová Castle, a castle in the municipality
- Maria Klenova, Russian marine scientist
