= Dúbrava, Snina District =

Dúbrava
- Municipality
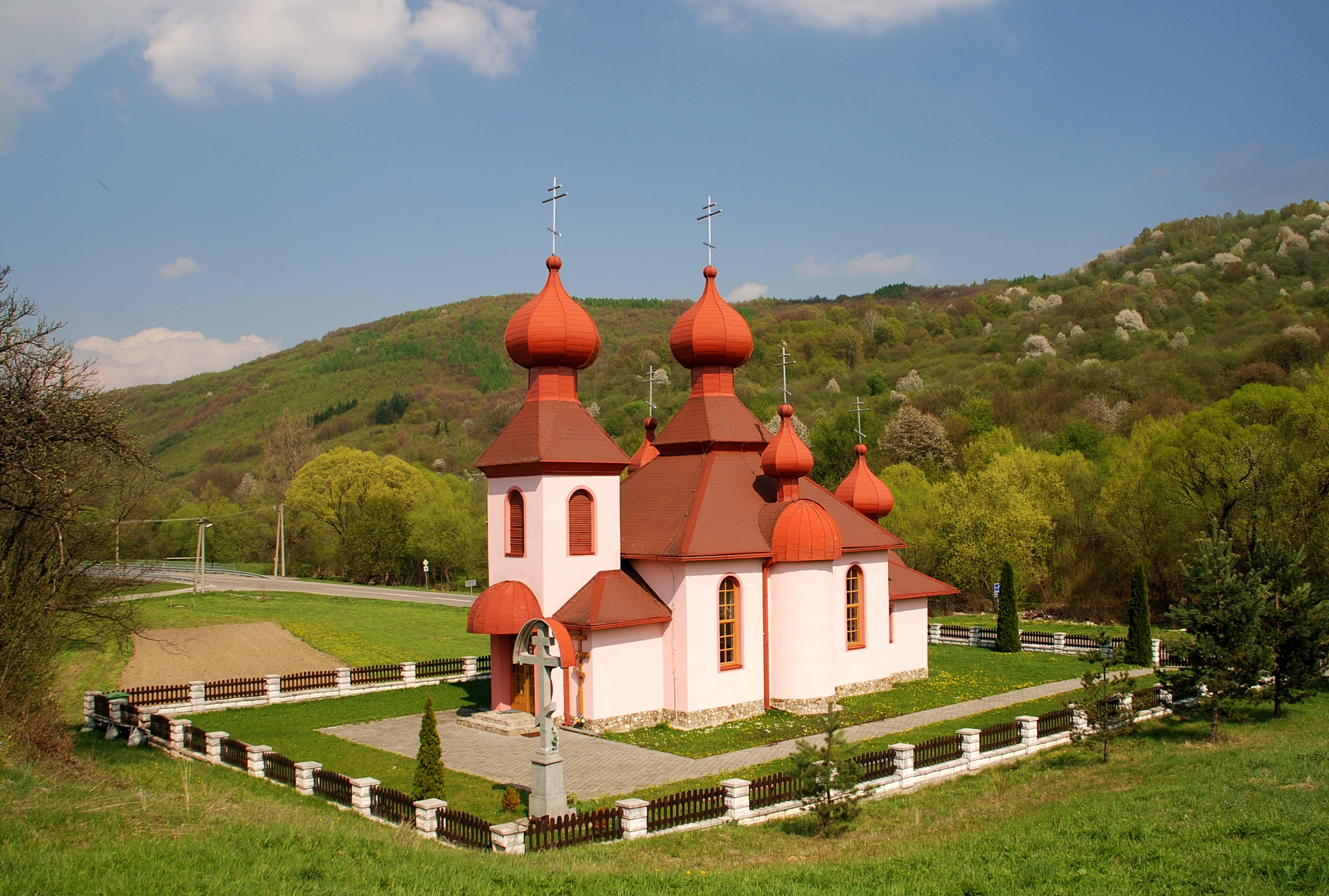

- Flag

- Location of Dúbrava in the Prešov Region Location of Dúbrava in Slovakia
- Coordinates: 48.88°N 22.36°E
- Country: Slovakia
- Region: Prešov Region
- District: Snina District
- First mentioned: 1548

Area
  - Total: 9.53 km^{2} (3.68 sq mi)
- Elevation: 255 m (837 ft)

Population (2025)
  - Total: 204
- Time zone: UTC+1 (CET)
  - Summer (DST): UTC+2 (CEST)
- Postal code: 677 3
- Area code: +421 57
- Vehicle registration plate (until 2022): SV

Dúbrava (Hungarian: Kistölgyes, Rusyn: Дубрава) is a village and municipality in Snina District in the Prešov Region of north-eastern Slovakia.

== History ==
In historical records the village was first mentioned in 1548. Before the establishment on independent Czechoslovakia in 1918, Dúbrava was part of Zemplén County within the Kingdom of Hungary. In 1939, it was for a short time part of the Slovak Republic. As a result of the Slovak–Hungarian War of 1939, it was again part of Hungary from 1939 to 1944. In the autumn of 1944, the Red Army entered Dúbrava and it was once again part of Czechoslovakia.

== Geography ==
The municipality lies at an altitude of 255 metres (837 ft) and covers an area of 9.53 km^{2} (3.68 sq mi) (2025).

The name of the village means an oak grove.

== Population ==
Population statistic (10 years)
Year	1995	2005	2015	2025
Count	265	270	230	204
Difference		+1.88%	−14.81%	−11.30%

Population statistic
Year	2024	2025
Count	209	204
Difference		−2.39%

It has a population of 204 people (31 December 2025).

=== Ethnicity ===
Census 2021 (1+ %)
Ethnicity	Number	Fraction
Slovak	182	85.84%
Rusyn	85	40.09%
Not found out	5	2.35%
Czech	4	1.88%
Ukrainian	4	1.88%
Total	212	

In year 2021 was 212 people by ethnicity 182 as Slovak, 85 as Rusyn, 5 as Not found out, 4 as Czech, 4 as Ukrainian, 2 as Romani, 2 as Hungarian and 1 as Polish.

Note on population: The difference values of population numbers in the table "Population statistic" and in the sections "Ethnicity" & "Religion" is caused by the use of various statistical methods.

=== Religion ===
Census 2021 (1+ %)
Religion	Number	Fraction
Greek Catholic Church	92	43.4%
Eastern Orthodox Church	82	38.68%
None	20	9.43%
Roman Catholic Church	17	8.02%
Total	212	

In year 2021 was 212 people by religion 92 from Greek Catholic Church, 82 from Eastern Orthodox Church, 20 from None, 17 from Roman Catholic Church and 1 from Not found out.
