= Jalová =

- Municipality
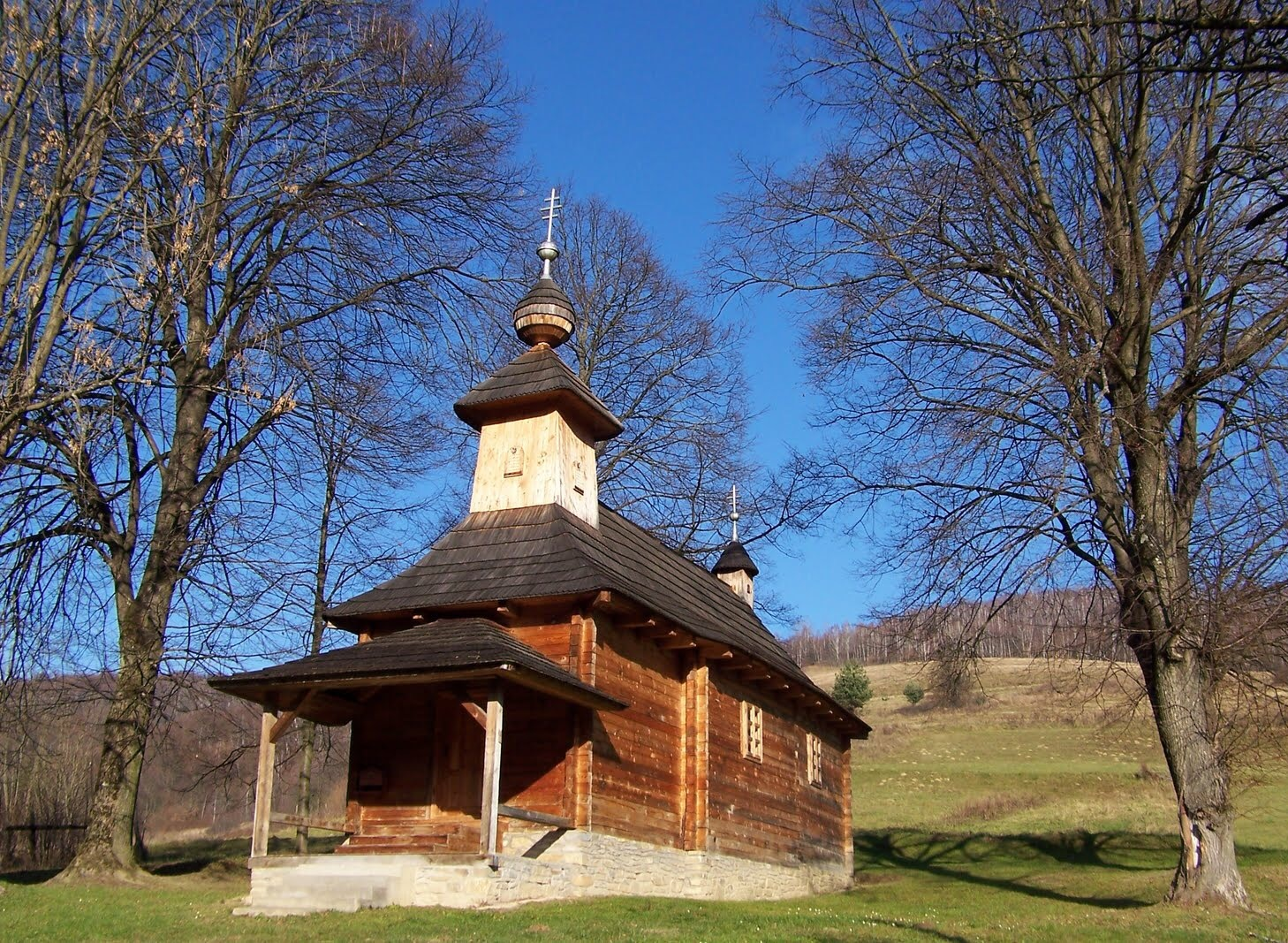

- Flag

- Location of Jalová in the Prešov Region Location of Jalová in Slovakia
- Coordinates: 49.05°N 22.25°E
- Country: Slovakia
- Region: Prešov Region
- District: Snina District
- First mentioned: 1568

Area
  - Total: 2.78 km^{2} (1.07 sq mi)
- Elevation: 339 m (1,112 ft)

Population (2025)
  - Total: 61
- Time zone: UTC+1 (CET)
  - Summer (DST): UTC+2 (CEST)
- Postal code: 676 1
- Area code: +421 57
- Vehicle registration plate (until 2022): SV
- Website: obecjalova38.webnode.sk

Jalová (Hungarian: Jármos, Rusyn: Ялова) is a village and municipality in Snina District in the Prešov Region of north-eastern Slovakia.

== History ==
In historical records the village was first mentioned in 1568. Before the establishment of independent Czechoslovakia in 1918, Jalová was part of Zemplén County within the Kingdom of Hungary. In 1939, it was for a short time part of the Slovak Republic. As a result of the Slovak–Hungarian War of 1939, it was from 1939 to 1944 again part of Hungary. In the autumn of 1944, the Red Army entered Jalová and it was once again part of Czechoslovakia.

== Geography ==
The municipality lies at an altitude of 339 metres (1,112 ft) and covers an area of 2.78 km^{2} (1.07 sq mi) (2025).

== Population ==
Population statistic (10 years)
Year	1995	2005	2015	2025
Count	93	90	71	61
Difference		−3.22%	−21.11%	−14.08%

Population statistic
Year	2024	2025
Count	60	61
Difference		+1.66%

It has a population of 61 people (31 December 2025).

=== Ethnicity ===
Census 2021 (1+ %)
Ethnicity	Number	Fraction
Slovak	47	73.43%
Rusyn	27	42.18%
Not found out	4	6.25%
Other	2	3.12%
Czech	1	1.56%
Ukrainian	1	1.56%
Hungarian	1	1.56%
Total	64	

In year 2021 was 64 people by ethnicity 47 as Slovak, 27 as Rusyn, 4 as Not found out, 2 as Other, 1 as Czech, 1 as Ukrainian and 1 as Hungarian.

Note on population: The difference values of population numbers in the table "Population statistic" and in the sections "Ethnicity" & "Religion" is caused by the use of various statistical methods.

=== Religion ===
Census 2021 (1+ %)
Religion	Number	Fraction
Eastern Orthodox Church	26	40.63%
Greek Catholic Church	25	39.06%
None	7	10.94%
Roman Catholic Church	4	6.25%
Not found out	2	3.13%
Total	64	

In year 2021 was 64 people by religion 26 from Eastern Orthodox Church, 25 from Greek Catholic Church, 7 from None, 4 from Roman Catholic Church and 2 from Not found out.
