= Šmigovec =

- Municipality
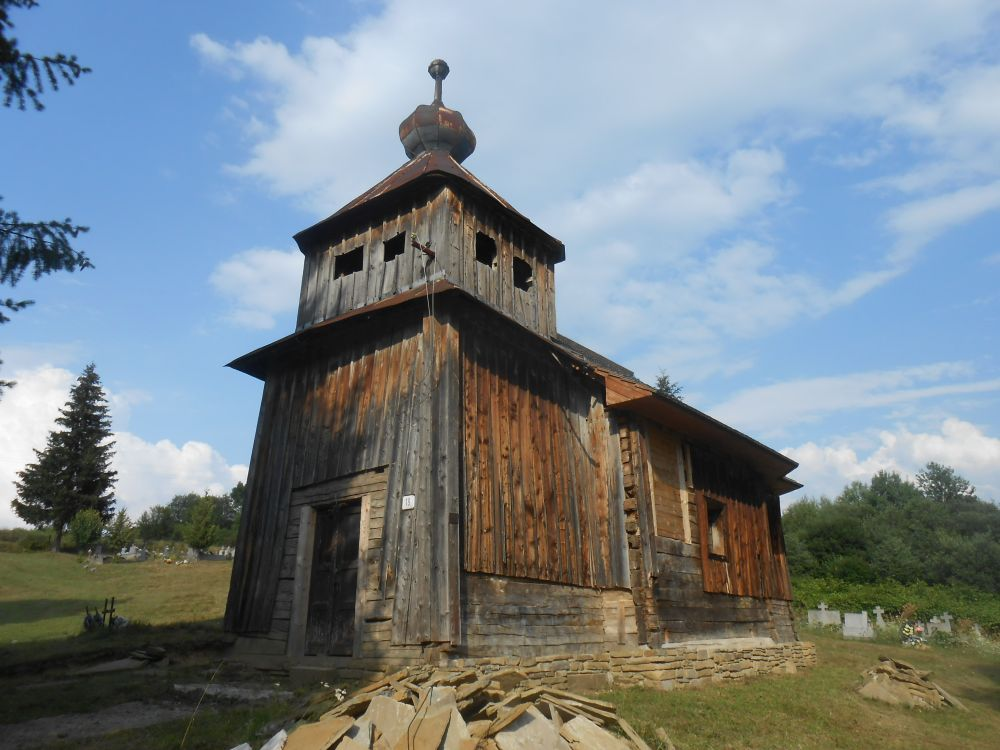
- Wooden church of the Ascencion of Christ

- Flag

- Location of Šmigovec in the Prešov Region Location of Šmigovec in Slovakia
- Coordinates: 48.90°N 22.32°E
- Country: Slovakia
- Region: Prešov Region
- District: Snina District
- First mentioned: 1569

Area
  - Total: 7.13 km^{2} (2.75 sq mi)
- Elevation: 321 m (1,053 ft)

Population (2025)
  - Total: 75
- Time zone: UTC+1 (CET)
  - Summer (DST): UTC+2 (CEST)
- Postal code: 677 4
- Area code: +421 57
- Vehicle registration plate (until 2022): SV

Šmigovec (Hungarian: Súgó, Rusyn: Шмиґовець) is a village and municipality in Snina District in the Prešov Region of north-eastern Slovakia.

== History ==
In historical records the village was first mentioned in 1569. Before the establishment of independent Czechoslovakia in 1918, Šmigovec was part of Zemplén County within the Kingdom of Hungary. In 1939, it was for a short time part of the Slovak Republic. As a result of the Slovak–Hungarian War of 1939, it was from 1939 to 1944 again part of Hungary. In the autumn of 1944, the Red Army entered Šmigovec and it was once again part of Czechoslovakia.

== Geography ==
The municipality lies at an altitude of 321 metres (1,053 ft) and covers an area of 7.13 km^{2} (2.75 sq mi) (2025).

== Population ==
Population statistic (10 years)
Year	1995	2005	2015	2025
Count	119	88	87	75
Difference		−26.05%	−1.13%	−13.79%

Population statistic
Year	2024	2025
Count	78	75
Difference		−3.84%

It has a population of 75 people (31 December 2025).

=== Ethnicity ===
Census 2021 (1+ %)
Ethnicity	Number	Fraction
Slovak	69	85.18%
Rusyn	30	37.03%
Romani	16	19.75%
Not found out	5	6.17%
Czech	2	2.46%
Hungarian	2	2.46%
Total	81	

In year 2021 was 81 people by ethnicity 69 as Slovak, 30 as Rusyn, 16 as Romani, 5 as Not found out, 2 as Czech and 2 as Hungarian.

Note on population: The difference values of population numbers in the table "Population statistic" and in the sections "Ethnicity" & "Religion" is caused by the use of various statistical methods.

=== Religion ===
Census 2021 (1+ %)
Religion	Number	Fraction
Greek Catholic Church	47	58.02%
Roman Catholic Church	19	23.46%
Eastern Orthodox Church	6	7.41%
None	5	6.17%
Not found out	4	4.94%
Total	81	

In year 2021 was 81 people by religion 47 from Greek Catholic Church, 19 from Roman Catholic Church, 6 from Eastern Orthodox Church, 5 from None and 4 from Not found out.
