= Pčoliné =

- Municipality
- Flag

- Location of Pčoliné in the Prešov Region Location of Pčoliné in Slovakia
- Coordinates: 49.07°N 22.17°E
- Country: Slovakia
- Region: Prešov Region
- District: Snina District
- First mentioned: 1557

Area
  - Total: 33.53 km^{2} (12.95 sq mi)
- Elevation: 290 m (950 ft)

Population (2025)
  - Total: 537
- Time zone: UTC+1 (CET)
  - Summer (DST): UTC+2 (CEST)
- Postal code: 673 5
- Area code: +421 57
- Vehicle registration plate (until 2022): SV
- Website: www.pcoline.sk

Pčoliné (Hungarian: Méhesfalva, Rusyn: Пчолине) is a village and municipality in Snina District in the Prešov Region of north-eastern Slovakia.

== History ==
In historical records the village was first mentioned in 1557. Before the establishment of independent Czechoslovakia in 1918, Pčoliné was part of Zemplén County within the Kingdom of Hungary. From 1939 to 1944, it was part of the Slovak Republic. On 25 November 1944, the Red Army dislodged the Wehrmacht from Pčoliné and it was once again part of Czechoslovakia.

== Geography ==
The municipality lies at an altitude of 290 metres (950 ft) and covers an area of 33.53 km^{2} (12.95 sq mi) (2025).

== Population ==
Population statistic (10 years)
Year	1995	2005	2015	2025
Count	636	582	560	537
Difference		−8.49%	−3.78%	−4.10%

Population statistic
Year	2024	2025
Count	542	537
Difference		−0.92%

It has a population of 537 people (31 December 2025).

=== Ethnicity ===
Census 2021 (1+ %)
Ethnicity	Number	Fraction
Slovak	396	71.86%
Rusyn	288	52.26%
Not found out	21	3.81%
Ukrainian	10	1.81%
Total	551	

In year 2021 was 551 people by ethnicity 396 as Slovak, 288 as Rusyn, 21 as Not found out, 10 as Ukrainian, 5 as Czech, 2 as French, 1 as Jewish, 1 as Romani, 1 as Russian, 1 as Other and 1 as English.

Note on population: The difference values of population numbers in the table "Population statistic" and in the sections "Ethnicity" & "Religion" is caused by the use of various statistical methods.

=== Religion ===
Census 2021 (1+ %)
Religion	Number	Fraction
Greek Catholic Church	379	68.78%
Roman Catholic Church	67	12.16%
None	51	9.26%
Eastern Orthodox Church	25	4.54%
Not found out	21	3.81%
Jehovah's Witnesses	7	1.27%
Total	551	

In year 2021 was 551 people by religion 379 from Greek Catholic Church, 67 from Roman Catholic Church, 51 from None, 25 from Eastern Orthodox Church, 21 from Not found out, 7 from Jehovah's Witnesses and 1 from Jewish community.
