= Čukalovce =

- Municipality
- Flag

- Location of Čukalovce in the Prešov Region Location of Čukalovce in Slovakia
- Coordinates: 49.10°N 22.17°E
- Country: Slovakia
- Region: Prešov Region
- District: Snina District
- First mentioned: 1567

Area
  - Total: 9.02 km^{2} (3.48 sq mi)
- Elevation: 396 m (1,299 ft)

Population (2025)
  - Total: 151
- Time zone: UTC+1 (CET)
  - Summer (DST): UTC+2 (CEST)
- Postal code: 673 5
- Area code: +421 57
- Vehicle registration plate (until 2022): SV
- Website: www.cukalovce.sk

Čukalovce (Rusyn: Чукалівцї, Hungarian: Csukaháza) is a village and municipality in Snina District in the Prešov Region of north-eastern Slovakia.

== History ==
In historical records the village was first mentioned in 1567. Before the establishment of independent Czechoslovakia in 1918, Čukalovce was part of Zemplén County within the Kingdom of Hungary. From 1939 to 1944, it was part of the Slovak Republic. On 25 November 1944, the Red Army dislodged the Wehrmacht from Čukalovce and it was once again part of Czechoslovakia.

== Geography ==
The municipality lies at an altitude of 396 metres (1,299 ft) and covers an area of 9.02 km^{2} (3.48 sq mi) (2025).

== Population ==
Population statistic (10 years)
Year	1995	2005	2015	2025
Count	171	154	172	151
Difference		−9.94%	+11.68%	−12.20%

Population statistic
Year	2024	2025
Count	156	151
Difference		−3.20%

It has a population of 151 people (31 December 2025).

=== Ethnicity ===
Census 2021 (1+ %)
Ethnicity	Number	Fraction
Slovak	108	66.66%
Rusyn	102	62.96%
Not found out	8	4.93%
Ukrainian	3	1.85%
Total	162	

In year 2021 was 162 people by ethnicity 108 as Slovak, 102 as Rusyn, 8 as Not found out, 3 as Ukrainian, 1 as Czech and 1 as Other.

Note on population: The difference values of population numbers in the table "Population statistic" and in the sections "Ethnicity" & "Religion" is caused by the use of various statistical methods.

=== Religion ===
Census 2021 (1+ %)
Religion	Number	Fraction
Eastern Orthodox Church	70	43.21%
Greek Catholic Church	54	33.33%
None	15	9.26%
Roman Catholic Church	10	6.17%
Not found out	7	4.32%
Evangelical Church	6	3.7%
Total	162	

In year 2021 was 162 people by religion 70 from Eastern Orthodox Church, 54 from Greek Catholic Church, 15 from None, 10 from Roman Catholic Church, 7 from Not found out and 6 from Evangelical Church.
