= Zemplínske Hámre =

- Municipality
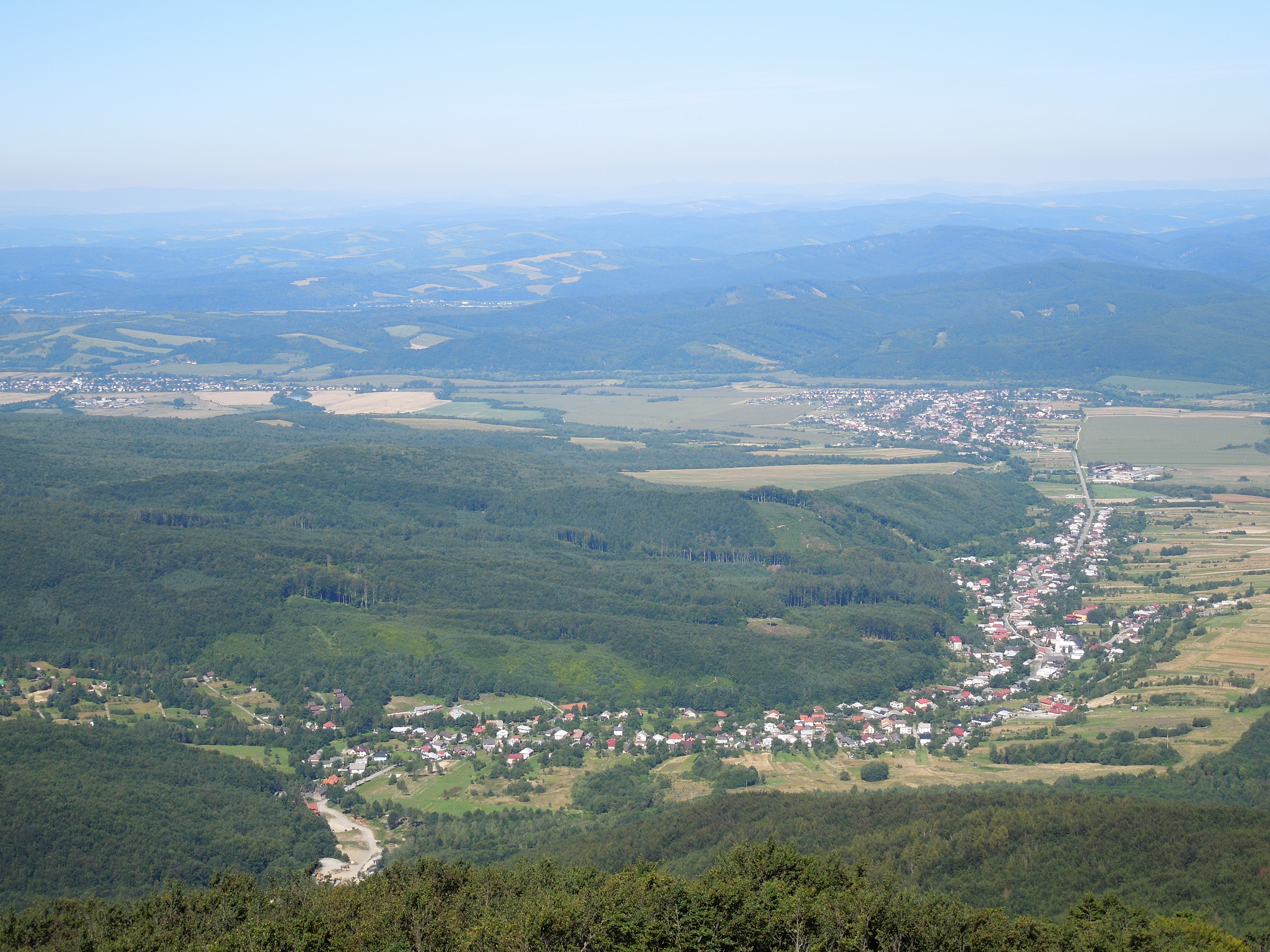

- Flag

- Location of Zemplínske Hámre in the Prešov Region Location of Zemplínske Hámre in Slovakia
- Coordinates: 48.95°N 22.15°E
- Country: Slovakia
- Region: Prešov Region
- District: Snina District
- First mentioned: 1954

Area
  - Total: 8.44 km^{2} (3.26 sq mi)
- Elevation: 347 m (1,138 ft)

Population (2025)
  - Total: 1,304
- Time zone: UTC+1 (CET)
  - Summer (DST): UTC+2 (CEST)
- Postal code: 677 7
- Area code: +421 57
- Vehicle registration plate (until 2022): SV
- Website: www.zemplinskehamre.sk

Zemplínske Hámre (Hungarian: Jozsefhámor) is a village and municipality in Snina District in the Prešov Region of north-eastern Slovakia.

== History ==
The village received municipal status in 1954. Before the establishment of independent Czechoslovakia in 1918, Zemplinské Hámre was part of Zemplén County within the Kingdom of Hungary. From 1939 to 1944, it was part of the Slovak Republic. In the autumn of 1944, the Red Army dislodged the Wehrmacht from Zemplinské Hámre and it was once again part of Czechoslovakia.

== Geography ==
The municipality lies at an altitude of 347 metres (1,138 ft) and covers an area of 8.44 km^{2} (3.26 sq mi) (2025).

== Population ==
Population statistic (10 years)
Year	1995	2005	2015	2025
Count	1238	1249	1282	1304
Difference		+0.88%	+2.64%	+1.71%

Population statistic
Year	2024	2025
Count	1291	1304
Difference		+1.00%

It has a population of 1304 people (31 December 2025).

=== Ethnicity ===
Census 2021 (1+ %)
Ethnicity	Number	Fraction
Slovak	1216	95.74%
Rusyn	42	3.3%
Not found out	37	2.91%
Total	1270	

In year 2021 was 1270 people by ethnicity 1216 as Slovak, 42 as Rusyn, 37 as Not found out, 5 as Czech, 1 as Ukrainian, 1 as Italian, 1 as Polish, 1 as German, 1 as Hungarian and 1 as Other.

Note on population: The difference values of population numbers in the table "Population statistic" and in the sections "Ethnicity" & "Religion" is caused by the use of various statistical methods.

=== Religion ===
Census 2021 (1+ %)
Religion	Number	Fraction
Roman Catholic Church	1092	85.98%
None	56	4.41%
Greek Catholic Church	46	3.62%
Not found out	37	2.91%
Eastern Orthodox Church	27	2.13%
Total	1270	

In year 2021 was 1270 people by religion 1092 from Roman Catholic Church, 56 from None, 46 from Greek Catholic Church, 37 from Not found out, 27 from Eastern Orthodox Church, 5 from Jehovah's Witnesses, 3 from Other, 3 from Evangelical Church and 1 from Ad hoc movements.
