= Michajlov =

- Municipality
- Flag

- Location of Michajlov in the Prešov Region Location of Michajlov in Slovakia
- Coordinates: 48.92°N 22.35°E
- Country: Slovakia
- Region: Prešov Region
- District: Snina District
- First mentioned: 1557

Area
  - Total: 4.67 km^{2} (1.80 sq mi)
- Elevation: 243 m (797 ft)

Population (2025)
  - Total: 77
- Time zone: UTC+1 (CET)
  - Summer (DST): UTC+2 (CEST)
- Postal code: 677 3
- Area code: +421 57
- Vehicle registration plate (until 2022): SV
- Website: obecmichajlov.sk

Michajlov (Hungarian: Kismihály, Rusyn: Михайлів) is a village and municipality in Snina District in the Prešov Region of north-eastern Slovakia.

== History ==
In historical records the village was first mentioned in 1557 AD. Before the establishment of independent Czechoslovakia in 1918, Michajlov was part of Zemplén County within the Kingdom of Hungary. In 1939, it was for a short time part of the Slovak Republic. As a result of the Slovak–Hungarian War of 1939, it was from 1939 to 1944 again part of Hungary. In the autumn of 1944, the Red Army entered Michajlov and it was once again part of Czechoslovakia.

== Geography ==
The municipality lies at an altitude of 243 metres (797 ft) and covers an area of 4.67 km^{2} (1.80 sq mi) (2025).

== Population ==
Population statistic (10 years)
Year	1995	2005	2015	2025
Count	120	108	91	77
Difference		−10%	−15.74%	−15.38%

Population statistic
Year	2024	2025
Count	81	77
Difference		−4.93%

It has a population of 77 people (31 December 2025).

=== Ethnicity ===
Census 2021 (1+ %)
Ethnicity	Number	Fraction
Slovak	70	85.36%
Rusyn	45	54.87%
Ukrainian	5	6.09%
Other	1	1.21%
Total	82	

In year 2021 was 82 people by ethnicity 70 as Slovak, 45 as Rusyn, 5 as Ukrainian and 1 as Other.

Note on population: The difference values of population numbers in the table "Population statistic" and in the sections "Ethnicity" & "Religion" is caused by the use of various statistical methods.

=== Religion ===
Census 2021 (1+ %)
Religion	Number	Fraction
Eastern Orthodox Church	46	56.1%
Greek Catholic Church	28	34.15%
None	6	7.32%
Roman Catholic Church	2	2.44%
Total	82	

In year 2021 was 82 people by religion 46 from Eastern Orthodox Church, 28 from Greek Catholic Church, 6 from None and 2 from Roman Catholic Church.
