= Bieszczady Starry-Sky Park =

Dark-sky park in Poland

- Milky Way seen from the Bieszczady Mountains
- Interactive map of Bieszczady Starry-Sky Park
- Area: 113,846.41 ha (439.5634 sq mi)
- Established: 8 March 2013
- Website: www.gwiezdnebieszczady.pl

The Bieszczady Starry-Sky Park (Polish: Park Gwiezdnego Nieba „Bieszczady”) is a dark-sky preserve in Podkarpackie Voivodeship, Poland. It includes the areas of Bieszczady National Park, Cisna-Wetlina Landscape Park, and San Valley Landscape Park. Established in 2013, it is the second dark-sky preserve in Poland (after the Jizera Dark-Sky Park) and with the area of 113,846.41 ha, the second largest dark-sky preserve in Europe (after the Brecon Beacons National Park in Wales). It is part of the international East Carpathian Dark-Sky Tripark together with the Poloniny Dark-Sky Park in Slovakia and the Transcarpathian Dark-Sky Park in Ukraine.

== See also ==
- Manětín Dark-Sky Park – Dark-sky preserve in the Czech Republic
- Beskydy Dark-Sky Park – Dark-sky preserve in the Czech Republic and Slovakia
