= Brezovec, Slovakia =

Brezovec
- Municipality
- Flag

- Location of Brezovec in the Prešov Region Location of Brezovec in Slovakia
- Coordinates: 48.93°N 22.42°E
- Country: Slovakia
- Region: Prešov Region
- District: Snina District
- First mentioned: 1600

Government
  - Mayor: Michal Hakulin (Independent)

Area
  - Total: 3.42 km^{2} (1.32 sq mi)
- Elevation: 269 m (883 ft)

Population (2025)
  - Total: 34
- Time zone: UTC+1 (CET)
  - Summer (DST): UTC+2 (CEST)
- Postal code: 677 3
- Area code: +421 57
- Vehicle registration plate (until 2022): SV

Brezovec (Rusyn: Березовець, Hungarian: Berezóc) is a village and municipality in Snina District in the Prešov Region of north-eastern Slovakia.

== History ==
In historical records the village was first mentioned in 1600. Before the establishment of independent Czechoslovakia in 1918, it was part of Zemplén County within the Kingdom of Hungary. In 1939, it was for a short time part of the newly-established Slovak Republic. From 1939 to 1944, it was part of Hungary as a result of the Slovak–Hungarian War. In the autumn of 1944, the Red Army entered Brezovec and it was once again part of Czechoslovakia.

== Geography ==
The municipality lies at an altitude of 269 metres (883 ft) and covers an area of 3.42 km^{2} (1.32 sq mi) (2025).

== Population ==
Population statistic (10 years)
Year	1995	2005	2015	2025
Count	72	54	34	34
Difference		−25%	−37.03%	−1.42%

Population statistic
Year	2024	2025
Count	36	34
Difference		−5.55%

It has a population of 34 people (31 December 2025).

=== Ethnicity ===
Census 2021 (1+ %)
Ethnicity	Number	Fraction
Slovak	21	53.84%
Rusyn	19	48.71%
Hungarian	4	10.25%
Ukrainian	2	5.12%
Not found out	2	5.12%
Total	39	

In year 2021 was 39 people by ethnicity 21 as Slovak, 19 as Rusyn, 4 as Hungarian, 2 as Ukrainian and 2 as Not found out.

Note on population: The difference values of population numbers in the table "Population statistic" and in the sections "Ethnicity" & "Religion" is caused by the use of various statistical methods.

=== Religion ===
Census 2021 (1+ %)
Religion	Number	Fraction
Eastern Orthodox Church	24	61.54%
Roman Catholic Church	6	15.38%
Greek Catholic Church	4	10.26%
Not found out	3	7.69%
Calvinist Church	1	2.56%
None	1	2.56%
Total	39	

In year 2021 was 39 people by religion 24 from Eastern Orthodox Church, 6 from Roman Catholic Church, 4 from Greek Catholic Church, 3 from Not found out, 1 from Calvinist Church and 1 from None.

== Genealogical resources ==
The records for genealogical research are available at the state archive "Statny Archiv in Presov, Slovakia"

- Roman Catholic church records (births/marriages/deaths): 1783-1895 (parish B)
- Greek Catholic church records (births/marriages/deaths): 1833-1929 (parish B)

== See also ==
- List of municipalities and towns in Slovakia
