= Belá nad Cirochou =

- Municipality
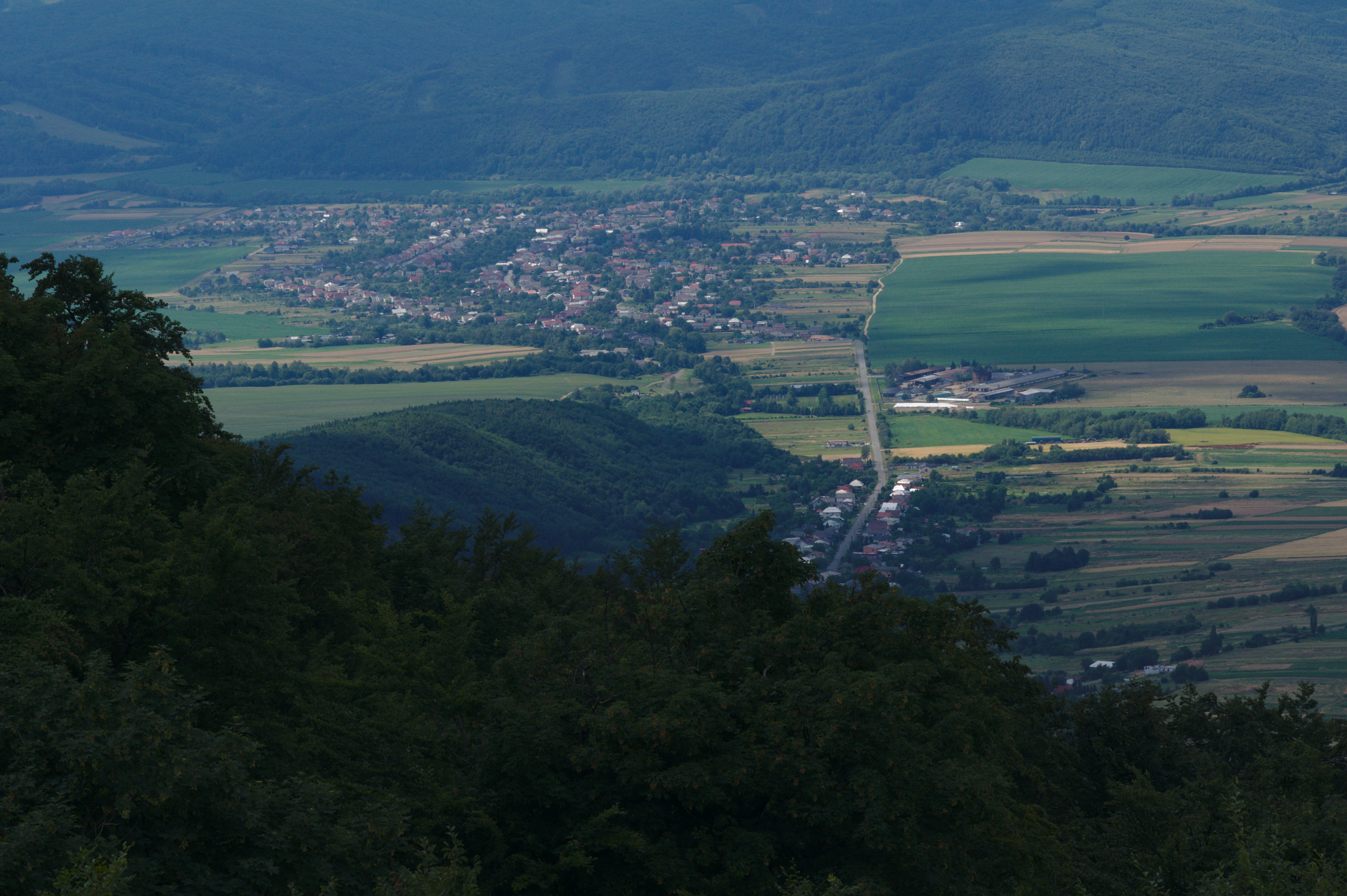

- Flag

- Location of Belá nad Cirochou in the Prešov Region Location of Belá nad Cirochou in Slovakia
- Coordinates: 48.97°N 22.10°E
- Country: Slovakia
- Region: Prešov Region
- District: Snina District
- First mentioned: 1451

Area
  - Total: 17.35 km^{2} (6.70 sq mi)
- Elevation: 211 m (692 ft)

Population (2025)
  - Total: 3,264
- Time zone: UTC+1 (CET)
  - Summer (DST): UTC+2 (CEST)
- Postal code: 678 1
- Area code: +421 57
- Vehicle registration plate (until 2022): SV
- Website: www.belanadcirochou.sk

Belá nad Cirochou (Rusyn: Бела над Цірохов, Hungarian: Cirókabéla) is a large village and municipality in Snina District in the Prešov Region of north-eastern Slovakia.

== History ==
In historical records the village was first mentioned in 1451. Before the establishment of independent Czechoslovakia in 1918, Belá nad Cirochou was part of Zemplén County within the Kingdom of Hungary. From 1939 to 1944, it was part of the Slovak Republic. In the autumn of 1944, the Red Army dislodged the Wehrmacht from Belá nad Cirochou and it was once again part of Czechoslovakia.

== Geography ==
The municipality lies at an altitude of 211 metres (692 ft) and covers an area of 17.35 km^{2} (6.70 sq mi) (2025).

== Population ==
Population statistic (10 years)
Year	1995	2005	2015	2025
Count	3179	3311	3361	3264
Difference		+4.15%	+1.51%	−2.88%

Population statistic
Year	2024	2025
Count	3279	3264
Difference		−0.45%

It has a population of 3264 people (31 December 2025).

=== Ethnicity ===
Census 2021 (1+ %)
Ethnicity	Number	Fraction
Slovak	3286	97.53%
Not found out	81	2.4%
Rusyn	66	1.95%
Total	3369	

In year 2021 was 3369 people by ethnicity 3286 as Slovak, 81 as Not found out, 66 as Rusyn, 11 as Romani, 8 as Czech, 6 as Other, 3 as Ukrainian, 3 as Russian, 1 as Polish, 1 as German and 1 as English.

Note on population: The difference values of population numbers in the table "Population statistic" and in the sections "Ethnicity" & "Religion" is caused by the use of various statistical methods.

=== Religion ===
Census 2021 (1+ %)
Religion	Number	Fraction
Roman Catholic Church	3068	91.07%
None	99	2.94%
Greek Catholic Church	91	2.7%
Not found out	67	1.99%
Total	3369	

In year 2021 was 3369 people by religion 3068 from Roman Catholic Church, 99 from None, 91 from Greek Catholic Church, 67 from Not found out, 23 from Eastern Orthodox Church, 9 from Ad hoc movements, 4 from Evangelical Church, 3 from Christian Congregations in Slovakia, 2 from Other, 1 from Calvinist Church, 1 from Hinduism and 1 from Buddhism.

== Genealogical resources ==
The records for genealogical research are available at the state archive "Statny Archiv in Presov, Slovakia"

- Roman Catholic church records (births/marriages/deaths): 1786–1895 (parish B)
- Greek Catholic church records (births/marriages/deaths): 1825–1895 (parish B)

== See also ==
- List of municipalities and towns in Slovakia
