= Osadné =

- Municipality
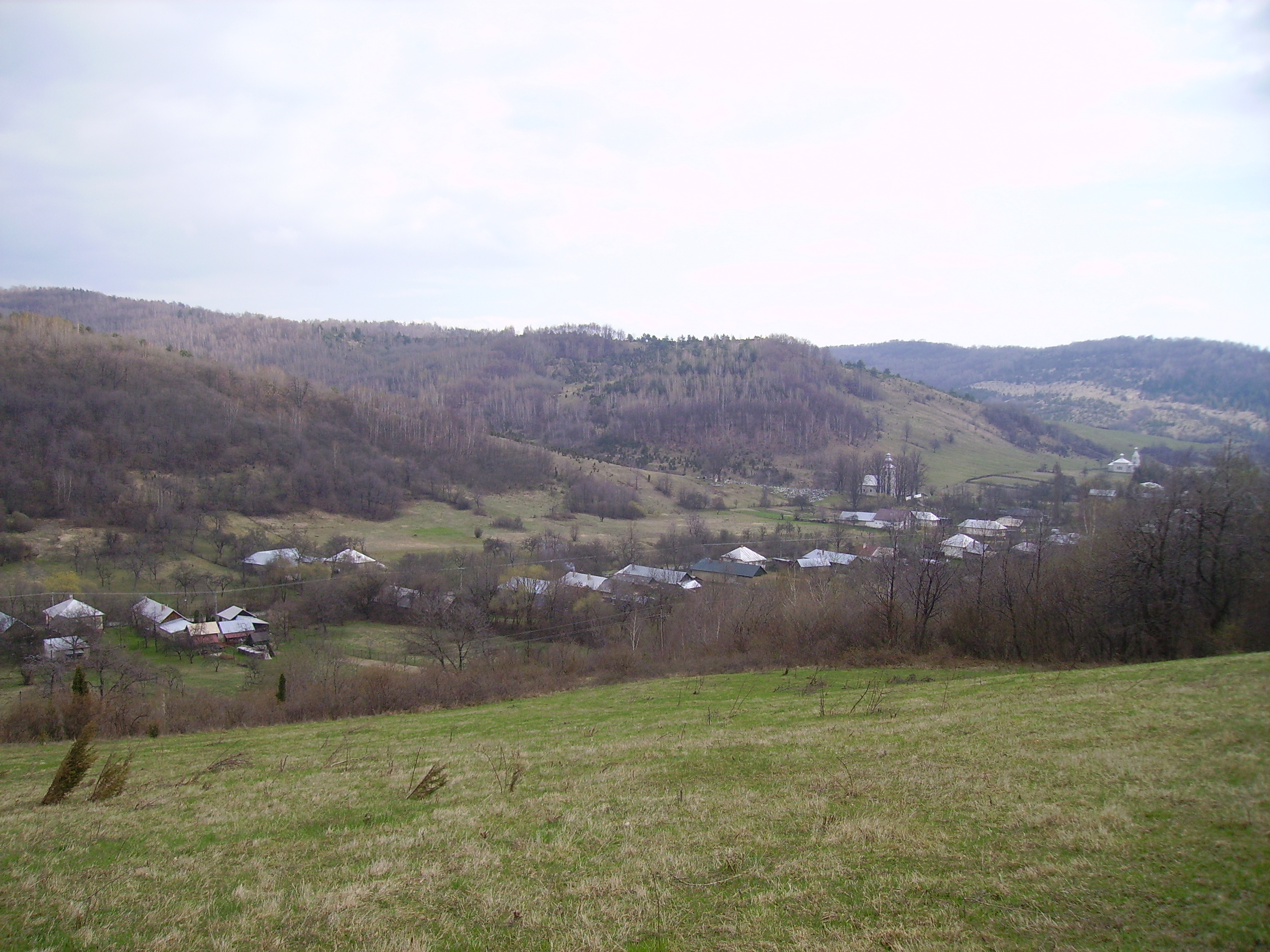

- Flag

- Location of Osadné in the Prešov Region Location of Osadné in Slovakia
- Coordinates: 49.15°N 22.17°E
- Country: Slovakia
- Region: Prešov Region
- District: Snina District
- First mentioned: 1639

Area
  - Total: 26.50 km^{2} (10.23 sq mi)
- Elevation: 382 m (1,253 ft)

Population (2025)
  - Total: 137
- Time zone: UTC+1 (CET)
  - Summer (DST): UTC+2 (CEST)
- Postal code: 673 4
- Area code: +421 57
- Vehicle registration plate (until 2022): SV
- Website: www.osadne.ocu.sk/sk/

Osadné (Hungarian: Telepóc, Rusyn: Осадне) is a village and municipality in Snina District in the Prešov Region of north-eastern Slovakia.

== History ==
In historical records the village was first mentioned in 1639. Before the establishment of independent Czechoslovakia in 1918, Osadné was part of Zemplén County within the Kingdom of Hungary. From 1939 to 1944, it was part of the Slovak Republic. In the autumn of 1944, the Red Army dislodged the Wehrmacht from Osadné and it was once again part of Czechoslovakia.

== Geography ==
The municipality lies at an altitude of 382 metres (1,253 ft) and covers an area of 26.50 km^{2} (10.23 sq mi) (2025).

== Population ==
Population statistic (10 years)
Year	1995	2005	2015	2025
Count	240	204	166	137
Difference		−15%	−18.62%	−17.46%

Population statistic
Year	2024	2025
Count	138	137
Difference		−0.72%

It has a population of 137 people (31 December 2025).

=== Ethnicity ===
Census 2021 (1+ %)
Ethnicity	Number	Fraction
Slovak	83	55.33%
Rusyn	63	42%
Romani	36	24%
Czech	3	2%
Not found out	3	2%
Total	150	

In year 2021 was 150 people by ethnicity 83 as Slovak, 63 as Rusyn, 36 as Romani, 3 as Czech, 3 as Not found out, 1 as Jewish and 1 as Russian.

Note on population: The difference values of population numbers in the table "Population statistic" and in the sections "Ethnicity" & "Religion" is caused by the use of various statistical methods.

=== Religion ===
Census 2021 (1+ %)
Religion	Number	Fraction
Eastern Orthodox Church	69	46%
Greek Catholic Church	59	39.33%
Roman Catholic Church	14	9.33%
None	5	3.33%
Total	150	

In year 2021 was 150 people by religion 69 from Eastern Orthodox Church, 59 from Greek Catholic Church, 14 from Roman Catholic Church, 5 from None, 1 from Other and not ascertained christian church, 1 from Not found out and 1 from Czechoslovak Hussite Church.

== Culture ==
The village was portrayed in a 2009 documentary film of the same name, directed by Marko Škop. The film won the award for best long-format documentary at the 2009 Karlovy Vary International Film Festival.
