= Stakčínska Roztoka =

- Municipality
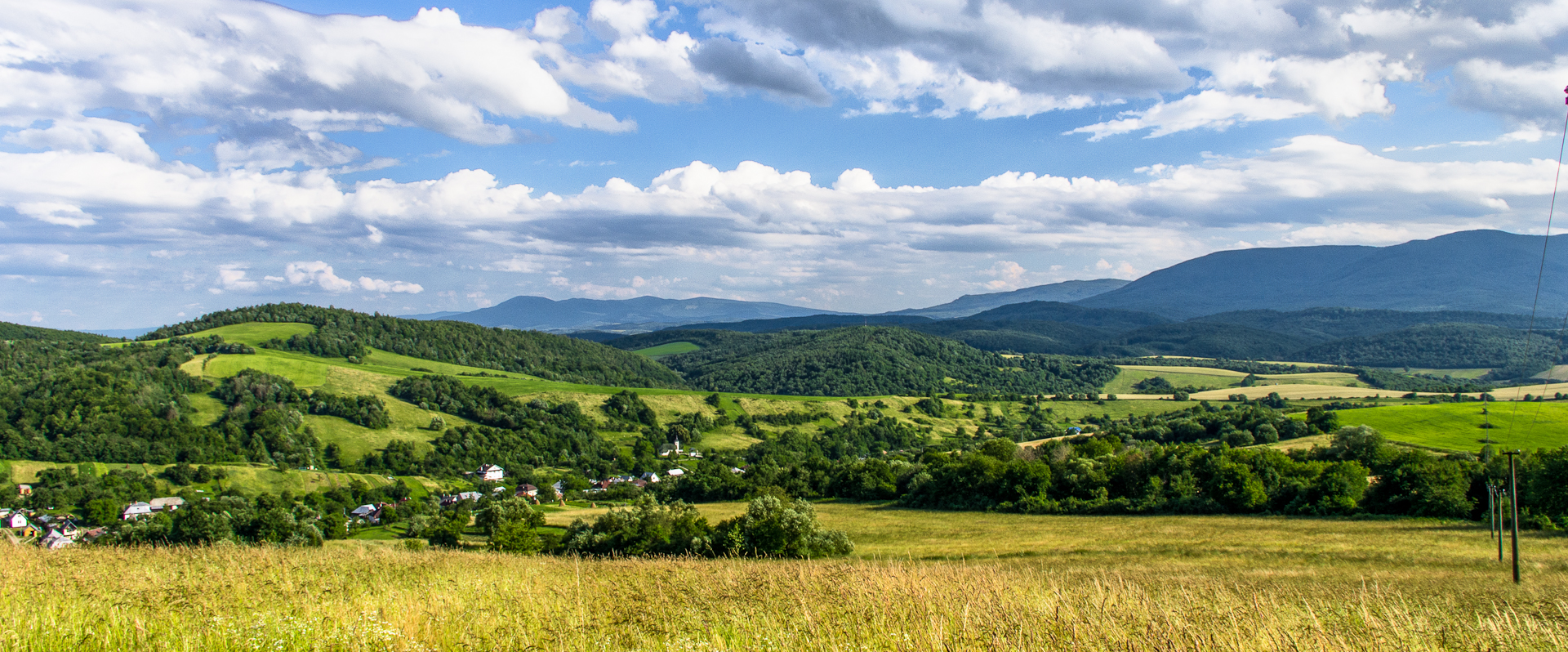

- Flag

- Location of Stakčínska Roztoka in the Prešov Region Location of Stakčínska Roztoka in Slovakia
- Coordinates: 49.00°N 22.28°E
- Country: Slovakia
- Region: Prešov Region
- District: Snina District
- First mentioned: 1574

Area
  - Total: 15.15 km^{2} (5.85 sq mi)
- Elevation: 359 m (1,178 ft)

Population (2025)
  - Total: 271
- Time zone: UTC+1 (CET)
  - Summer (DST): UTC+2 (CEST)
- Postal code: 676 1
- Area code: +421 57
- Vehicle registration plate (until 2022): SV
- Website: stakcinskaroztoka.sk

Stakčínska Roztoka (Hungarian: Zuhatag, Rusyn: Стащіньска Ростока) is a village and municipality in Snina District in the Prešov Region of north-eastern Slovakia.

== History ==
In historical records the village was first mentioned in 1574. Before the establishment of independent Czechoslovakia in 1918, Stakčínska Roztoka was part of Zemplén County within the Kingdom of Hungary. In 1939, it was for a short time part of the Slovak Republic. As a result of the Slovak–Hungarian War of 1939, it was from 1939 to 1944 again part of Hungary. In the autumn of 1944, the Red Army entered Stakčínska Roztoka and it was once again part of Czechoslovakia.

== Geography ==
The municipality lies at an altitude of 359 metres (1,178 ft) and covers an area of 15.15 km^{2} (5.85 sq mi) (2025).

== Population ==
Population statistic (10 years)
Year	1995	2005	2015	2025
Count	325	332	330	271
Difference		+2.15%	−0.60%	−17.87%

Population statistic
Year	2024	2025
Count	274	271
Difference		−1.09%

It has a population of 271 people (31 December 2025).

=== Ethnicity ===
Census 2021 (1+ %)
Ethnicity	Number	Fraction
Slovak	241	79.8%
Rusyn	181	59.93%
Ukrainian	11	3.64%
Total	302	

In year 2021 was 302 people by ethnicity 241 as Slovak, 181 as Rusyn, 11 as Ukrainian, 2 as Not found out, 1 as Czech and 1 as German.

Note on population: The difference values of population numbers in the table "Population statistic" and in the sections "Ethnicity" & "Religion" is caused by the use of various statistical methods.

=== Religion ===
Census 2021 (1+ %)
Religion	Number	Fraction
Greek Catholic Church	266	88.08%
Eastern Orthodox Church	22	7.28%
Roman Catholic Church	6	1.99%
Not found out	4	1.32%
None	4	1.32%
Total	302	

In year 2021 was 302 people by religion 266 from Greek Catholic Church, 22 from Eastern Orthodox Church, 6 from Roman Catholic Church, 4 from Not found out and 4 from None.
