= Snina District =

Coordinates: 48°59′15″N 22°9′7″E

- District
- Country: Slovakia
- Region (kraj): Prešov Region
- Seat: Snina

Area
  - Total: 804.74 km^{2} (310.71 sq mi)

Population (2025)
  - Total: 33,425
- Time zone: UTC+1 (CET)
  - Summer (DST): UTC+2 (CEST)
- Telephone prefix: 057
- Vehicle registration plate (until 2022): SV
- Municipalities: 34

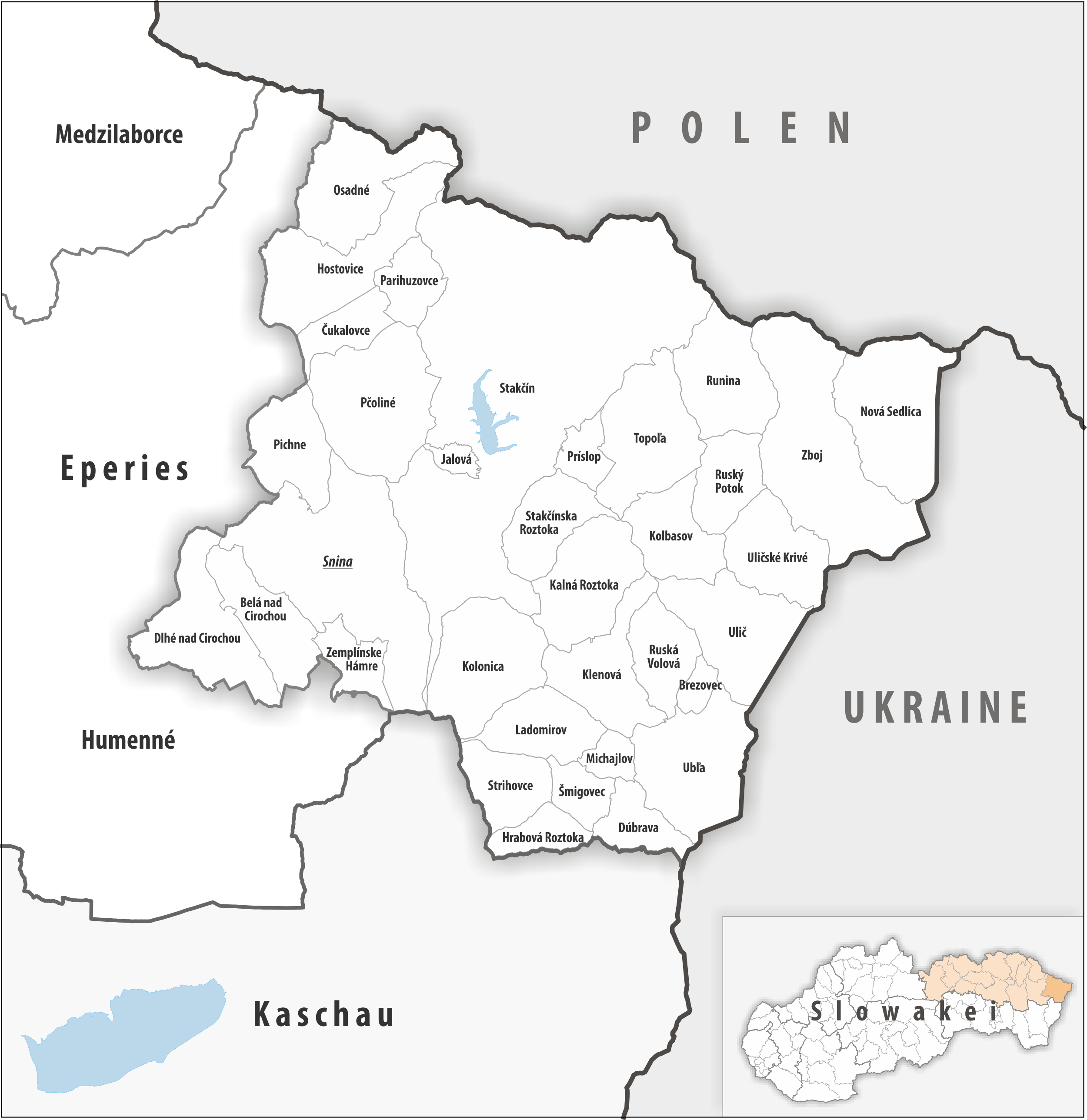
Map of the Prešov region

Snina District (Slovak: okres Snina) is a district in the Prešov Region of eastern Slovakia. Until 1918, the district was part of the county of Kingdom of Hungary of Zemplín. It's the easternmost district in Slovakia, and includes the easternmost point of the whole country, Kremenec. Snina, the district's administrative center is the only town in the district, and the easternmost town in Slovakia.

== Population ==
Population statistic (10 years)
Year	1995	2005	2015	2025
Count	39,416	39,090	37,197	33,425
Difference		−0.82%	−4.84%	−10.14%

Population statistic
Year	2024	2025
Count	33,792	33,425
Difference		−1.08%

It has a population of 33,425 people (31 December 2025).

Historical population
Year	Pop.	±%
1970	38,150	—
1980	38,228	+0.2%
1991	38,593	+1.0%
2001	39,633	+2.7%
2011	38,129	−3.8%
2021	35,125	−7.9%
Source: Statistical Office of the Slovak Republic

=== Ethnicity ===
Census 2021 (1+ %)
Ethnicity	Number	Fraction
Slovak	30,012	71.26%
Rusyn	8332	19.78%
Not found out	2157	5.12%
Romani	671	1.59%
Ukrainian	445	1.05%
Total	42,116	

In year 2021 was 42,116 people by ethnicity 30,012 as Slovak, 8332 as Rusyn, 2157 as Not found out, 671 as Romani, 445 as Ukrainian, 193 as Czech, 125 as Other, 48 as Hungarian, 34 as Russian, 30 as Polish, 16 as German, 10 as Italian, 8 as Vietnamese, 8 as English, 5 as Serbian, 4 as Jewish, 4 as French, 2 as Irish, 2 as Turkish, 2 as Moravian, 2 as Croatian, 2 as Bulgarian, 1 as Silesian, 1 as Romanian, 1 as Canadian and 1 as Albanian.

Note on population: The difference values of population numbers in the table "Population statistic" and in the sections "Ethnicity" & "Religion" is caused by the use of various statistical methods.

=== Religion ===
Census 2021 (1+ %)
Religion	Number	Fraction
Roman Catholic Church	15,977	45.49%
Greek Catholic Church	6886	19.6%
Eastern Orthodox Church	6736	19.18%
None	2695	7.67%
Not found out	2169	6.18%
Total	35,125	

In year 2021 was 35,125 people by religion 15,977 from Roman Catholic Church, 6886 from Greek Catholic Church, 6736 from Eastern Orthodox Church, 2695 from None, 2169 from Not found out, 300 from Jehovah's Witnesses, 87 from Evangelical Church, 73 from Ad hoc movements, 53 from Other and not ascertained christian church, 38 from Other, 25 from Christian Congregations in Slovakia, 23 from Islam, 22 from Calvinist Church, 11 from Paganism and natural spirituality, 8 from Apostolic Church, 7 from Buddhism, 4 from Jewish community, 3 from Church of the Brethren, 2 from Czechoslovak Hussite Church, 2 from Church of Jesus Christ of Latter-day Saints, 1 from Old Catholic Church, 1 from Hinduism, 1 from Seventh-day Adventist Church and 1 from Baptists Church.

== Municipalities ==
Municipality	Area [km^{2}]	Population
Belá nad Cirochou	17.35	3,264
Brezovec	3.42	34
Čukalovce	9.02	151
Dlhé nad Cirochou	26.29	1,865
Dúbrava	9.53	204
Hostovice	29.04	227
Hrabová Roztoka	7.45	59
Jalová	2.78	61
Kalná Roztoka	22.75	511
Klenová	20.03	492
Kolbasov	15.98	59
Kolonica	27.18	521
Ladomirov	15.24	239
Michajlov	4.67	77
Nová Sedlica	33.02	231
Osadné	26.50	137
Parihuzovce	9.52	27
Pčoliné	33.53	537
Pichne	16.82	548
Príslop	6.18	36
Runina	22.21	71
Ruská Volová	13.06	72
Ruský Potok	12.90	104
Snina	58.61	17,612
Stakčín	167.66	2,330
Stakčínska Roztoka	15.15	271
Strihovce	13.23	117
Šmigovec	7.13	75
Topoľa	26.40	149
Ubľa	29.14	760
Ulič	24.98	802
Uličské Krivé	19.13	225
Zboj	50.54	253
Zemplínske Hámre	8.44	1,304

Population and area values are current for year 2025.
