= Chapel of Virgin Mary =

Chapel in Snina, Slovakia

Coordinates: 48°59′29.9″N 22°08′17.6″E

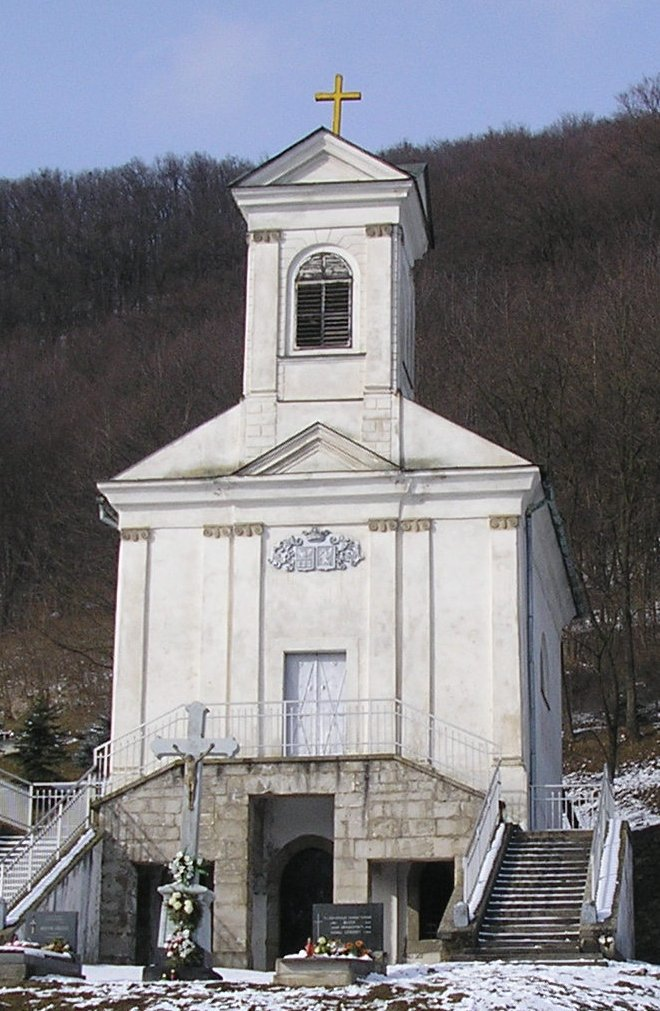
Chapel of Virgin Mary

The Chapel of Virgin Mary is a neoclassical building situated in one of the two cemeteries in Snina in Slovakia.

The chapel was built by Štefan Rholl in 1842. Because his family had roots in Snina, he built a tomb with a chapel for his deceased relatives. A former cemetery, which existed on the decline created by the backing-up of the river Pčolinka, was not suitable as Pčolinka posed a threat when it flooded.

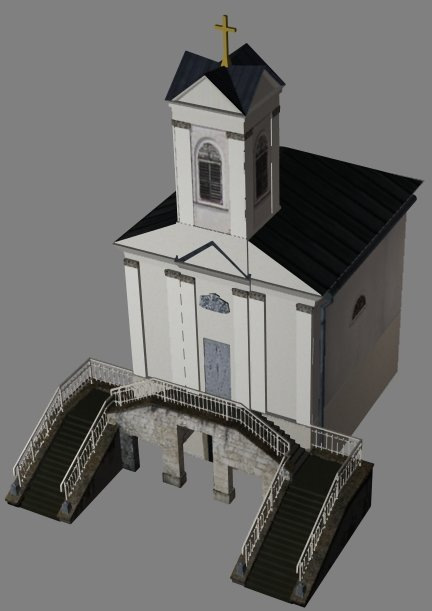
Rendering of model of Chapel of Virgin Mary

The roots of Rholls in Snina went back to 1799 when the businessman Jozef Rholl bought the lordship of Snina from the sons of countess Terézia van Dernáthová, an important event in Snina's history. Jozef Rholl came from a family which worked with metallurgy in Gemer and Spiš. In 1809, Jozef Rholl built iron-works with attached walled houses for the workers.

Under the chapel was the family tomb of Rholl, which was robbed during World War II. On a wall inside this chapel, this legend in Hungarian is well preserved:

Here lies Katherine, wife of respectable and courageous Jozef Rholl, born Uszfalvai. She sleeps forever since the day of Saint Michael in the year 1803, in the 55th year of her life. With thanks and deep regard from her son Stefan, built in 1842.
