= Pichne =

- Municipality
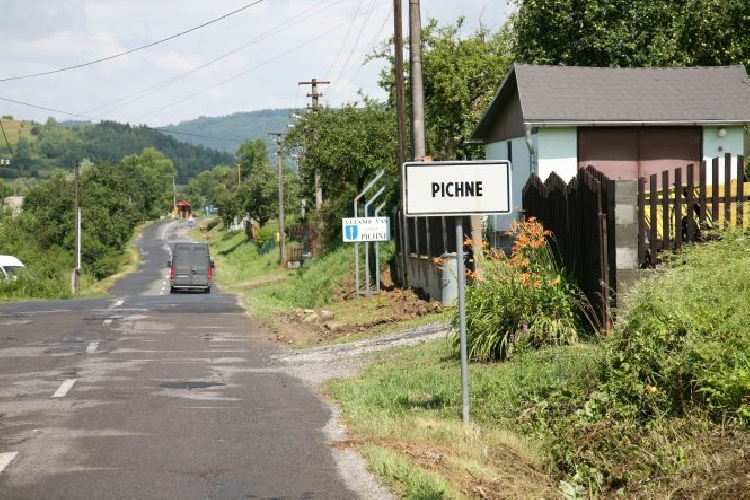

- Flag

- Location of Pichne in the Prešov Region Location of Pichne in Slovakia
- Coordinates: 49.03°N 22.13°E
- Country: Slovakia
- Region: Prešov Region
- District: Snina District
- First mentioned: 1312

Government
  - Mayor: Michal Rohač (HLAS–SD)

Area
  - Total: 16.82 km^{2} (6.49 sq mi)
- Elevation: 278 m (912 ft)

Population (2025)
  - Total: 548
- Time zone: UTC+1 (CET)
  - Summer (DST): UTC+2 (CEST)
- Postal code: 690 1
- Area code: +421 57
- Vehicle registration plate (until 2022): SV
- Website: www.pichne.sk

Pichne (Hungarian: Tüskés, Rusyn: Пыхнї) is a village and municipality in Snina District in the Prešov Region of north-eastern Slovakia.

== History ==
In historical records the village was first mentioned in 1312. Before the establishment of independent Czechoslovakia in 1918, Pichne was part of Zemplén County within the Kingdom of Hungary. From 1939 to 1944, it was part of the Slovak Republic. In 1944, the Red Army dislodged the Wehrmacht from Pichne and it was once again part of Czechoslovakia.

== Geography ==
The municipality lies at an altitude of 278 metres (912 ft) and covers an area of 16.82 km^{2} (6.49 sq mi) (2025).

== Population ==
Population statistic (10 years)
Year	1995	2005	2015	2025
Count	553	556	568	548
Difference		+0.54%	+2.15%	−3.52%

Population statistic
Year	2024	2025
Count	547	548
Difference		+0.18%

It has a population of 548 people (31 December 2025).

=== Ethnicity ===
Census 2021 (1+ %)
Ethnicity	Number	Fraction
Slovak	444	79.42%
Rusyn	240	42.93%
Not found out	32	5.72%
Ukrainian	20	3.57%
Total	559	

In year 2021 was 559 people by ethnicity 444 as Slovak, 240 as Rusyn, 32 as Not found out, 20 as Ukrainian and 2 as Other.

Note on population: The difference values of population numbers in the table "Population statistic" and in the sections "Ethnicity" & "Religion" is caused by the use of various statistical methods.

=== Religion ===
Census 2021 (1+ %)
Religion	Number	Fraction
Greek Catholic Church	196	35.06%
Eastern Orthodox Church	184	32.92%
Roman Catholic Church	101	18.07%
None	38	6.8%
Not found out	31	5.55%
Total	559	

In year 2021 was 559 people by religion 196 from Greek Catholic Church, 184 from Eastern Orthodox Church, 101 from Roman Catholic Church, 38 from None, 31 from Not found out, 2 from Other and not ascertained christian church, 2 from Islam, 2 from Apostolic Church, 1 from Jehovah's Witnesses, 1 from Evangelical Church and 1 from Ad hoc movements.
