= Zboj =

- Municipality
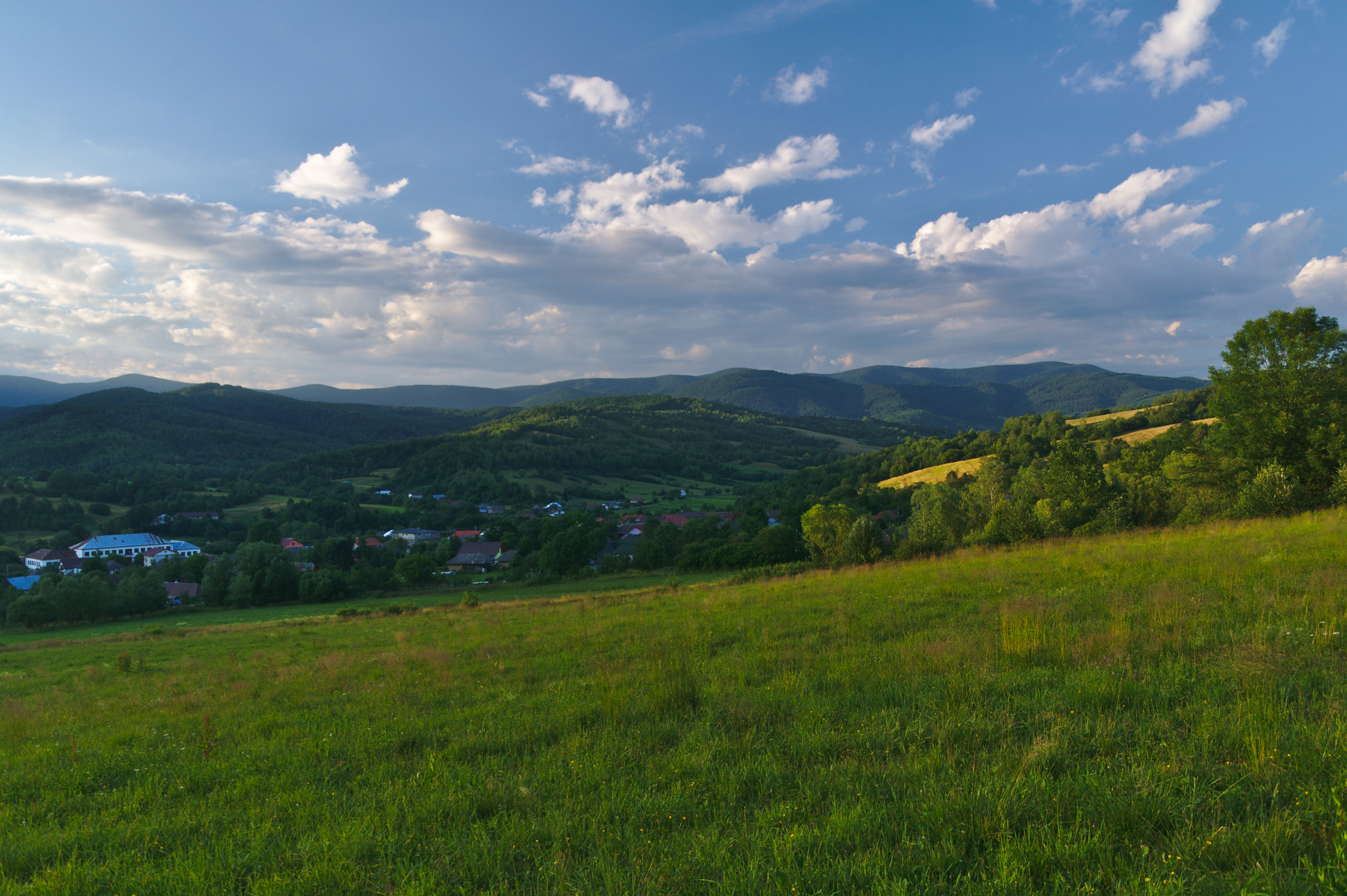

- Flag

- Location of Zboj in the Prešov Region Location of Zboj in Slovakia
- Coordinates: 49.03°N 22.48°E
- Country: Slovakia
- Region: Prešov Region
- District: Snina District
- First mentioned: 1567

Area
  - Total: 50.54 km^{2} (19.51 sq mi)
- Elevation: 345 m (1,132 ft)

Population (2025)
  - Total: 253
- Time zone: UTC+1 (CET)
  - Summer (DST): UTC+2 (CEST)
- Postal code: 676 8
- Area code: +421 57
- Vehicle registration plate (until 2022): SV
- Website: www.zboj.sk

Zboj (Hungarian: Harcos, Rusyn: Збой) is a village and municipality in Snina District in the Prešov Region of north-eastern Slovakia.

== History ==
In historical records the village was first mentioned in 1567. Before the establishment of independent Czechoslovakia in 1918, Zboj was part of Zemplén County within the Kingdom of Hungary. In 1939, it was for a short time part of the Slovak Republic. From 1939 to 1944, as a result of the Slovak–Hungarian War of 1939, it was again part of Hungary. On 18 October 1944, the Red Army entered Zboj and it was once again part of Czechoslovakia.

== Geography ==
The municipality lies at an altitude of 345 metres (1,132 ft) and covers an area of 50.54 km^{2} (19.51 sq mi) (2025).

== Population ==
Population statistic (10 years)
Year	1995	2005	2015	2025
Count	563	436	337	253
Difference		−22.55%	−22.70%	−24.92%

Population statistic
Year	2024	2025
Count	257	253
Difference		−1.55%

It has a population of 253 people (31 December 2025).

=== Ethnicity ===
Census 2021 (1+ %)
Ethnicity	Number	Fraction
Slovak	223	78.24%
Rusyn	194	68.07%
Not found out	12	4.21%
Czech	7	2.45%
Ukrainian	6	2.1%
Total	285	

In year 2021 was 285 people by ethnicity 223 as Slovak, 194 as Rusyn, 12 as Not found out, 7 as Czech, 6 as Ukrainian and 1 as German.

Note on population: The difference values of population numbers in the table "Population statistic" and in the sections "Ethnicity" & "Religion" is caused by the use of various statistical methods.

=== Religion ===
Census 2021 (1+ %)
Religion	Number	Fraction
Eastern Orthodox Church	231	81.05%
None	23	8.07%
Greek Catholic Church	16	5.61%
Roman Catholic Church	7	2.46%
Not found out	7	2.46%
Total	285	

In year 2021 was 285 people by religion 231 from Eastern Orthodox Church, 23 from None, 16 from Greek Catholic Church, 7 from Roman Catholic Church, 7 from Not found out and 1 from Jehovah's Witnesses.
