= Dlhé nad Cirochou =

- Municipality
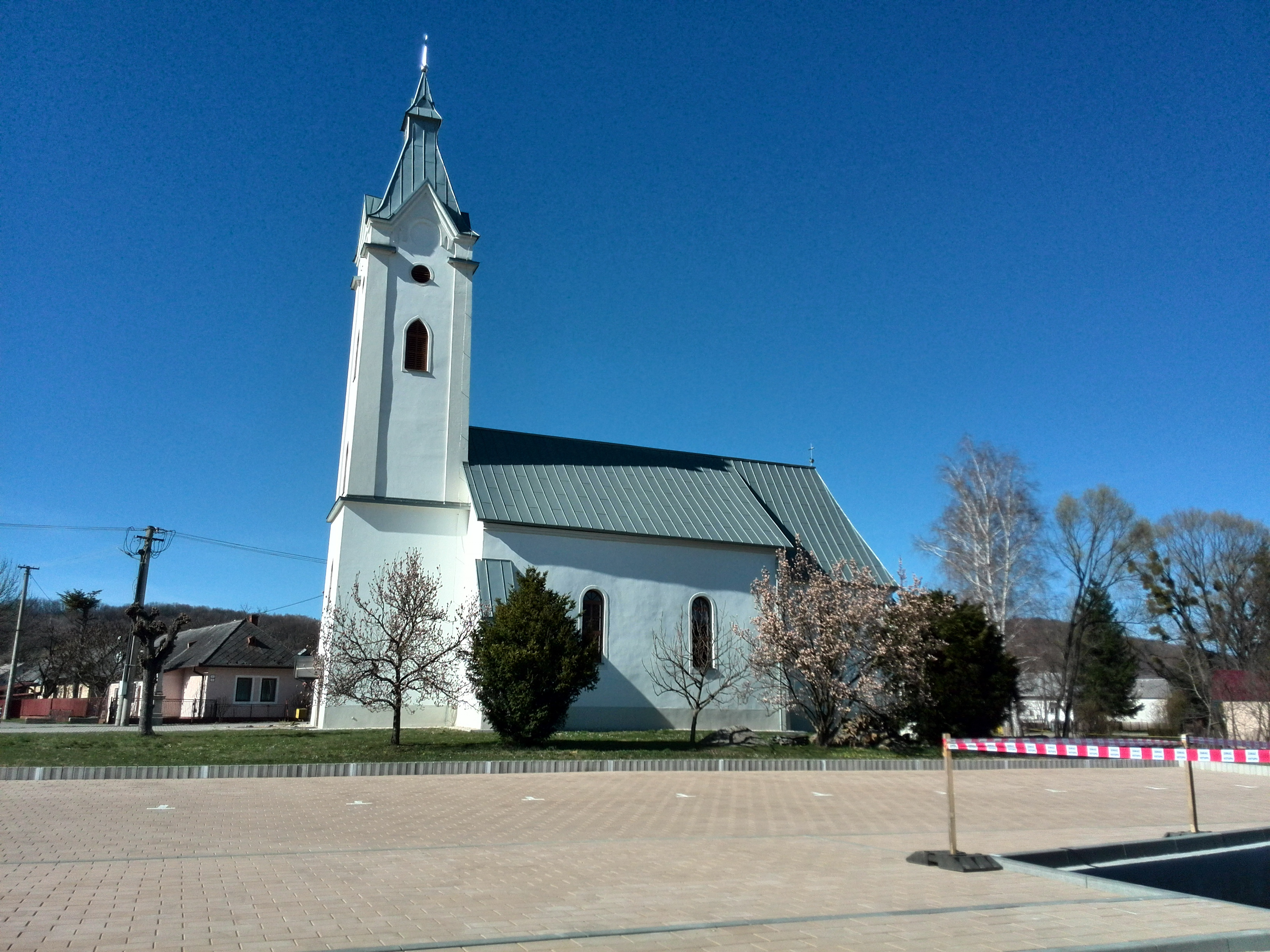

- Flag Coat of arms

- Location of Dlhé nad Cirochou in the Prešov Region Location of Dlhé nad Cirochou in Slovakia
- Coordinates: 48.97°N 22.07°E
- Country: Slovakia
- Region: Prešov Region
- District: Snina District
- First mentioned: 1342

Area
  - Total: 26.29 km^{2} (10.15 sq mi)
- Elevation: 185 m (607 ft)

Population (2025)
  - Total: 1,865
- Time zone: UTC+1 (CET)
  - Summer (DST): UTC+2 (CEST)
- Postal code: 678 2
- Area code: +421 57
- Vehicle registration plate (until 2022): SV
- Website: www.dlhenadcirochou.sk

Dlhé nad Cirochou (Hungarian: Cirókahosszúmező) is a village and municipality in Snina District in the Prešov Region of north-eastern Slovakia.

== History ==
In historical records the village was first mentioned in 1333. Before the establishment of independent Czechoslovakia in 1918, Dlhé nad Cirochou was part of Zemplén County within the Kingdom of Hungary. From 1939 to 1944, it was part of the Slovak Republic. In the autumn of 1944, the Red Army dislodged the Wehrmacht from Dlhé nad Cirochou and it was once again part of Czechoslovakia.

== Geography ==
The municipality lies at an altitude of 185 metres (607 ft) and covers an area of 26.29 km^{2} (10.15 sq mi) (2025).

== Population ==
Population statistic (10 years)
Year	1995	2005	2015	2025
Count	2051	2111	1969	1865
Difference		+2.92%	−6.72%	−5.28%

Population statistic
Year	2024	2025
Count	1868	1865
Difference		−0.16%

It has a population of 1865 people (31 December 2025).

=== Ethnicity ===
Census 2021 (1+ %)
Ethnicity	Number	Fraction
Slovak	1853	97.88%
Not found out	38	2%
Total	1893	

In year 2021 was 1893 people by ethnicity 1853 as Slovak, 38 as Not found out, 15 as Rusyn, 9 as Other, 7 as Ukrainian, 7 as Romani, 5 as Czech, 2 as Russian and 1 as Silesian.

Note on population: The difference values of population numbers in the table "Population statistic" and in the sections "Ethnicity" & "Religion" is caused by the use of various statistical methods.

=== Religion ===
Census 2021 (1+ %)
Religion	Number	Fraction
Roman Catholic Church	1704	90.02%
None	91	4.81%
Not found out	30	1.58%
Greek Catholic Church	30	1.58%
Total	1893	

In year 2021 was 1893 people by religion 1704 from Roman Catholic Church, 91 from None, 30 from Not found out, 30 from Greek Catholic Church, 18 from Eastern Orthodox Church, 6 from Jehovah's Witnesses, 4 from Christian Congregations in Slovakia, 3 from Other, 3 from Evangelical Church, 2 from Apostolic Church, 1 from Other and not ascertained christian church and 1 from Islam.

== Genealogical resources ==
The records for genealogical research are available at the state archive "Statny Archiv in Presov, Slovakia"

- Roman Catholic church records (births/marriages/deaths): 1805-1925 (parish A)
- Greek Catholic church records (births/marriages/deaths): 1825-1895 (parish B)

== See also ==
- List of municipalities and towns in Slovakia
