= Hostovice, Snina District =

Hostovice
- Municipality
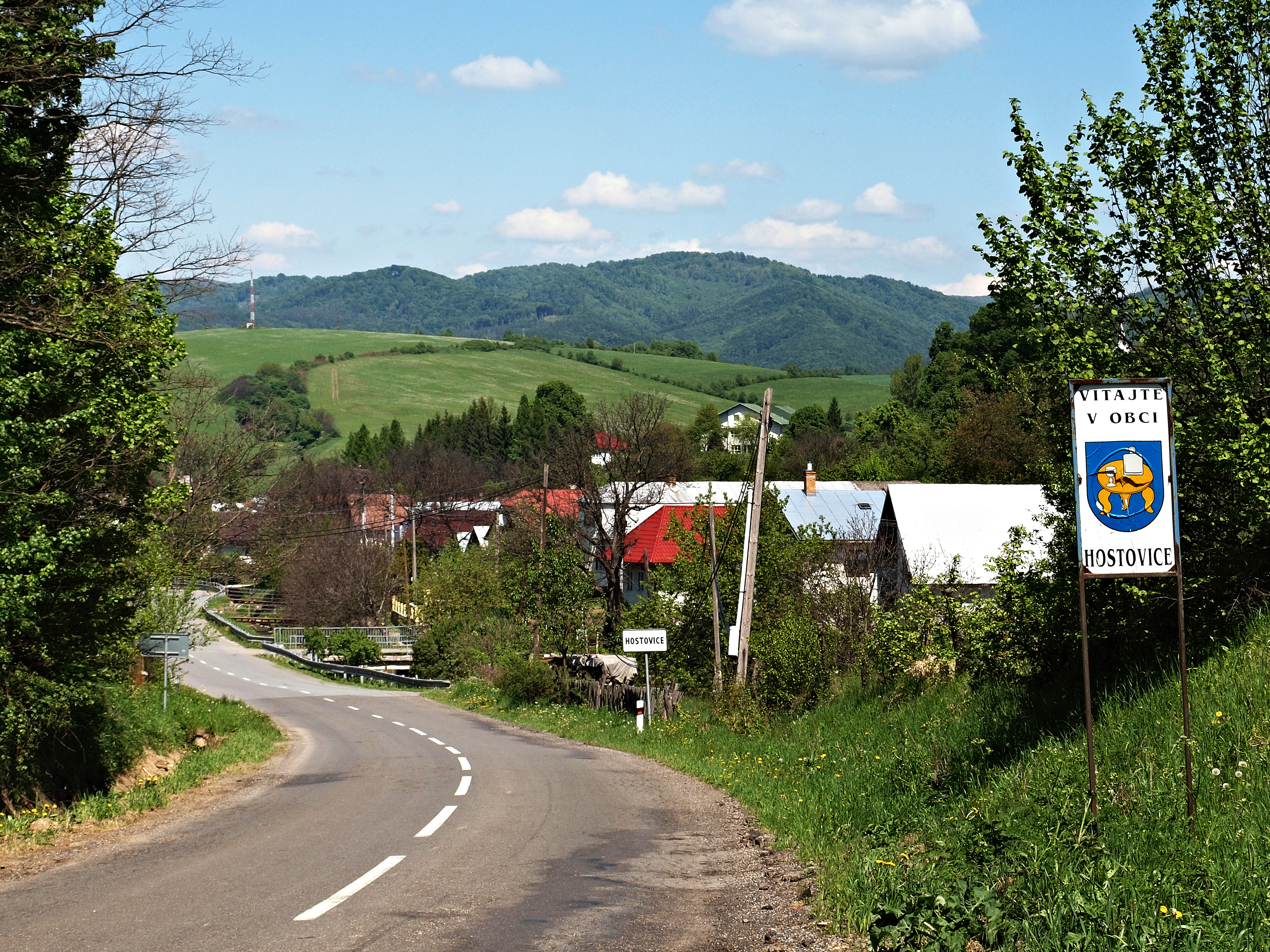

- Flag

- Location of Hostovice in the Prešov Region Location of Hostovice in Slovakia
- Coordinates: 49.12°N 22.15°E
- Country: Slovakia
- Region: Prešov Region
- District: Snina District
- First mentioned: 1354

Area
  - Total: 29.04 km^{2} (11.21 sq mi)
- Elevation: 358 m (1,175 ft)

Population (2025)
  - Total: 227
- Time zone: UTC+1 (CET)
  - Summer (DST): UTC+2 (CEST)
- Postal code: 673 5
- Area code: +421 57
- Vehicle registration plate (until 2022): SV
- Website: www.hostovice.sk

Hostovice (German: Vendégi, Rusyn: Гостовіцї) is a village and municipality in Snina District of the Prešov Region of north-eastern Slovakia.

== History ==
In historical records the village was first mentioned in 1354. Before the establishment of independent Czechoslovakia in 1918, Hostovice was part of Zemplén County within the Kingdom of Hungary. From 1939 to 1944, it was part of the Slovak Republic. In the autumn of 1944, the Red Army dislodged the Wehrmacht from Hostovice and it was once again part of Czechoslovakia.

== Geography ==
The municipality lies at an altitude of 358 metres (1,175 ft) and covers an area of 29.04 km^{2} (11.21 sq mi) (2025).

== Population ==
Population statistic (10 years)
Year	1995	2005	2015	2025
Count	370	342	292	227
Difference		−7.56%	−14.61%	−22.26%

Population statistic
Year	2024	2025
Count	235	227
Difference		−3.40%

It has a population of 227 people (31 December 2025).

=== Ethnicity ===
Census 2021 (1+ %)
Ethnicity	Number	Fraction
Slovak	193	76.58%
Rusyn	129	51.19%
Not found out	19	7.53%
Czech	5	1.98%
Ukrainian	3	1.19%
Total	252	

In year 2021 was 252 people by ethnicity 193 as Slovak, 129 as Rusyn, 19 as Not found out, 5 as Czech, 3 as Ukrainian, 2 as Romani, 2 as Russian and 1 as Hungarian.

Note on population: The difference values of population numbers in the table "Population statistic" and in the sections "Ethnicity" & "Religion" is caused by the use of various statistical methods.

=== Religion ===
Census 2021 (1+ %)
Religion	Number	Fraction
Greek Catholic Church	135	53.57%
Eastern Orthodox Church	44	17.46%
None	28	11.11%
Roman Catholic Church	22	8.73%
Not found out	19	7.54%
Paganism and natural spirituality	3	1.19%
Total	252	

In year 2021 was 252 people by religion 135 from Greek Catholic Church, 44 from Eastern Orthodox Church, 28 from None, 22 from Roman Catholic Church, 19 from Not found out, 3 from Paganism and natural spirituality and 1 from Ad hoc movements.
