= Ruská Volová =

Municipality in Slovakia

- Municipality
- Flag

- Location of Ruská Volová in the Prešov Region Location of Ruská Volová in Slovakia
- Coordinates: 48.94°N 22.37°E
- Country: Slovakia
- Region: Prešov Region
- District: Snina District
- First mentioned: 1609

Area
  - Total: 13.06 km^{2} (5.04 sq mi)
- Elevation: 248 m (814 ft)

Population (2025)
  - Total: 72
- Time zone: UTC+1 (CET)
  - Summer (DST): UTC+2 (CEST)
- Postal code: 677 2
- Area code: +421 57
- Vehicle registration plate (until 2022): SV
- Website: www.ruskavolova.sk

Ruská Volová (Hungarian: Barkócháza, Rusyn: Руська Волова) is a village and municipality in Snina District in the Prešov Region of north-eastern Slovakia.

== History ==
In historical records the village was first mentioned in 1609. Before the establishment of independent Czechoslovakia in 1918, Ruská Volová was part of Zemplén County within the Kingdom of Hungary. In 1939, it was for a short time part of the Slovak Republic. From 1939 to 1944, as a result of the Slovak–Hungarian War of 1939, it was again part of Hungary. In 1944, the Red Army entered Ruská Volová and it was once again part of Czechoslovakia.

== Geography ==
The municipality lies at an altitude of 248 metres (814 ft) and covers an area of 13.06 km^{2} (5.04 sq mi) (2025).

== Population ==
Population statistic (10 years)
Year	1995	2005	2015	2025
Count	160	127	100	72
Difference		−20.62%	−21.25%	−28%

Population statistic
Year	2024	2025
Count	74	72
Difference		−2.70%

It has a population of 72 people (31 December 2025).

=== Ethnicity ===
Census 2021 (1+ %)
Ethnicity	Number	Fraction
Slovak	67	78.82%
Rusyn	67	78.82%
Ukrainian	3	3.52%
Not found out	2	2.35%
Total	85	

In year 2021 was 85 people by ethnicity 67 as Slovak, 67 as Rusyn, 3 as Ukrainian and 2 as Not found out.

Note on population: The difference values of population numbers in the table "Population statistic" and in the sections "Ethnicity" & "Religion" is caused by the use of various statistical methods.

=== Religion ===
Census 2021 (1+ %)
Religion	Number	Fraction
Eastern Orthodox Church	67	78.82%
Greek Catholic Church	12	14.12%
Roman Catholic Church	3	3.53%
None	2	2.35%
Jehovah's Witnesses	1	1.18%
Total	85	

In year 2021 was 85 people by religion 67 from Eastern Orthodox Church, 12 from Greek Catholic Church, 3 from Roman Catholic Church, 2 from None and 1 from Jehovah's Witnesses.
