= Príslop =

- Municipality
- Flag

- Location of Príslop in the Prešov Region Location of Príslop in Slovakia
- Coordinates: 49.03°N 22.32°E
- Country: Slovakia
- Region: Prešov Region
- District: Snina District
- First mentioned: 1568

Area
  - Total: 6.18 km^{2} (2.39 sq mi)
- Elevation: 432 m (1,417 ft)

Population (2025)
  - Total: 36

Population by ethnicity (2021)
  - Slovak: 65.9%
  - Rusyn: 23.4%
  - Ukrainian: 2.1%
  - Other: 8.5%

Population by religion (2021)
  - Greek Catholic: 53.2%
  - Orthodox: 27.6%
  - Roman Catholic: 4.3%
  - Other: 10.6%
  - No religious belief: 4.7%
- Time zone: UTC+1 (CET)
  - Summer (DST): UTC+2 (CEST)
- Postal code: 676 6
- Area code: +421 57
- Vehicle registration plate (until 2022): SV
- Website: www.prislop.sk

Príslop (Hungarian: Kispereszlő, Rusyn: Присліп) is a village and municipality in Snina District in the Prešov Region of north-eastern Slovakia.

== History ==
In historical records the village was first mentioned in 1568. Before the establishment of independent Czechoslovakia in 1918, Príslop was part of Zemplén County within the Kingdom of Hungary. In 1939, it was for a short time part of the Slovak Republic. From 1939 to 1944, as a result of the Slovak–Hungarian War of 1939, it was again part of Hungary. On 26 October 1944, the Red Army entered Príslop and it was once again part of Czechoslovakia.

== Geography ==
The municipality lies at an altitude of 432 metres (1,417 ft) and covers an area of 6.18 km^{2} (2.39 sq mi) (2025).

== Population ==
Population statistic (10 years)
Year	1995	2005	2015	2025
Count	85	63	59	36
Difference		−25.88%	−6.34%	−38.98%

Population statistic
Year	2024	2025
Count	39	36
Difference		−7.69%

It has a population of 36 people (31 December 2025).

=== Ethnicity ===
Census 2021 (1+ %)
Ethnicity	Number	Fraction
Slovak	32	68.08%
Rusyn	18	38.29%
Not found out	4	8.51%
Ukrainian	1	2.12%
Total	47	

In year 2021 was 47 people by ethnicity 32 as Slovak, 18 as Rusyn, 4 as Not found out and 1 as Ukrainian.

Note on population: The difference values of population numbers in the table "Population statistic" and in the sections "Ethnicity" & "Religion" is caused by the use of various statistical methods.

=== Religion ===
Census 2021 (1+ %)
Religion	Number	Fraction
Greek Catholic Church	25	53.19%
Eastern Orthodox Church	13	27.66%
Not found out	4	8.51%
Roman Catholic Church	2	4.26%
None	2	4.26%
Other	1	2.13%
Total	47	

In year 2021 was 47 people by religion 25 from Greek Catholic Church, 13 from Eastern Orthodox Church, 4 from Not found out, 2 from Roman Catholic Church, 2 from None and 1 from Other.
