= Strihovce =

- Municipality
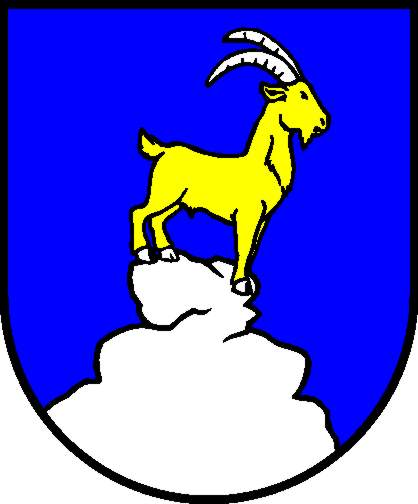
- Flag Coat of arms

- Location of Strihovce in the Prešov Region Location of Strihovce in Slovakia
- Coordinates: 48.90°N 22.28°E
- Country: Slovakia
- Region: Prešov Region
- District: Snina District
- First mentioned: 1635

Area
  - Total: 13.23 km^{2} (5.11 sq mi)
- Elevation: 425 m (1,394 ft)

Population (2025)
  - Total: 117
- Time zone: UTC+1 (CET)
  - Summer (DST): UTC+2 (CEST)
- Postal code: 677 4
- Area code: +421 57
- Vehicle registration plate (until 2022): SV

Strihovce (Hungarian: Szirtes, Rusyn: Стриговець) is a village and municipality in Snina District in the Prešov Region of north-eastern Slovakia.

== History ==
In historical records the village was first mentioned in 1323. Before the establishment of independent Czechoslovakia in 1918, Strihovce was part of Zemplén County within the Kingdom of Hungary. In 1939, it was for a short time part of the Slovak Republic. As a result of the Slovak–Hungarian War of 1939, it was from 1939 to 1944 again part of Hungary. In the autumn of 1944, the Red Army entered Strihovce and it was once again part of Czechoslovakia.

== Geography ==
The municipality lies at an altitude of 425 metres (1,394 ft) and covers an area of 13.23 km^{2} (5.11 sq mi) (2025).

== Population ==
Population statistic (10 years)
Year	1995	2005	2015	2025
Count	222	166	156	117
Difference		−25.22%	−6.02%	−25%

Population statistic
Year	2024	2025
Count	119	117
Difference		−1.68%

It has a population of 117 people (31 December 2025).

=== Ethnicity ===
Census 2021 (1+ %)
Ethnicity	Number	Fraction
Slovak	118	83.09%
Rusyn	104	73.23%
Ukrainian	6	4.22%
Not found out	5	3.52%
Czech	2	1.4%
Total	142	

In year 2021 was 142 people by ethnicity 118 as Slovak, 104 as Rusyn, 6 as Ukrainian, 5 as Not found out, 2 as Czech and 1 as Other.

Note on population: The difference values of population numbers in the table "Population statistic" and in the sections "Ethnicity" & "Religion" is caused by the use of various statistical methods.

=== Religion ===
Census 2021 (1+ %)
Religion	Number	Fraction
Greek Catholic Church	120	84.51%
None	13	9.15%
Eastern Orthodox Church	5	3.52%
Roman Catholic Church	4	2.82%
Total	142	

In year 2021 was 142 people by religion 120 from Greek Catholic Church, 13 from None, 5 from Eastern Orthodox Church and 4 from Roman Catholic Church.
