= Hrabová Roztoka =

- Municipality
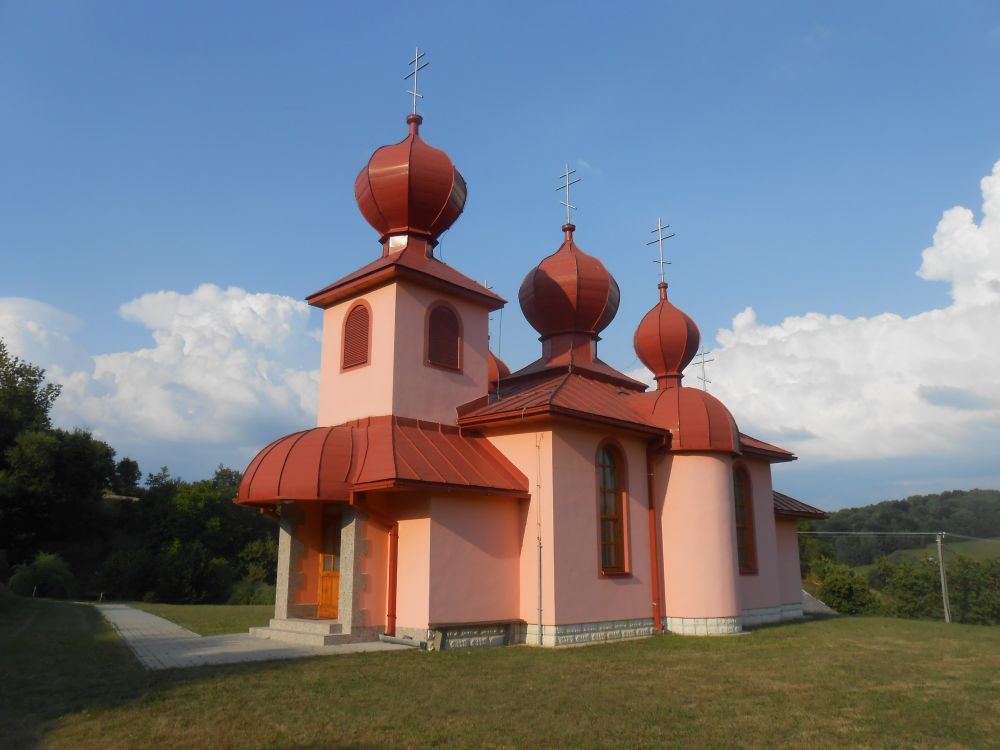
- Orthodox church of Saint Vladimir of Kiev

- Flag

- Location of Hrabová Roztoka in the Prešov Region Location of Hrabová Roztoka in Slovakia
- Coordinates: 48.88°N 22.30°E
- Country: Slovakia
- Region: Prešov Region
- District: Snina District
- First mentioned: 1568

Area
  - Total: 7.45 km^{2} (2.88 sq mi)
- Elevation: 389 m (1,276 ft)

Population (2025)
  - Total: 59
- Time zone: UTC+1 (CET)
  - Summer (DST): UTC+2 (CEST)
- Postal code: 677 4
- Area code: +421 57
- Vehicle registration plate (until 2022): SV

Hrabová Roztoka (Hungarian: Kisgereblyés, Rusyn: Грабова Розтока) is a village and municipality in Snina District in the Prešov Region of north-eastern Slovakia.

== History ==
In historical records the village was first mentioned in 1568. Before the establishment of independent Czechoslovakia in 1918, Hrabová Roztoka was part of Zemplén County within the Kingdom of Hungary. In 1939, it was for a short time part of the Slovak Republic. As a result of the Slovak–Hungarian War of 1939, it was from 1939 to 1944 again part of Hungary. In the autumn of 1944, the Red Army entered Hrabová Roztoka and it was once again part of Czechoslovakia.

== Geography ==
The municipality lies at an altitude of 389 metres (1,276 ft) and covers an area of 7.45 km^{2} (2.88 sq mi) (2025).

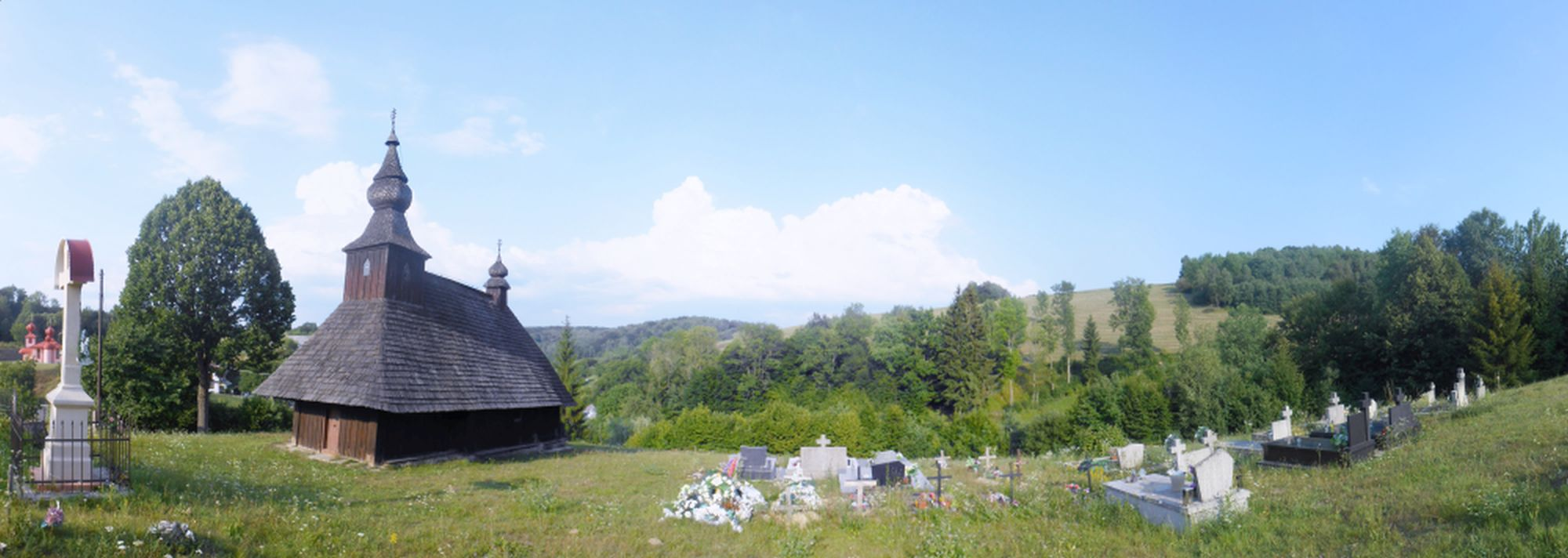
Wooden church of Saint Basil the Great with cemetery in Hrabová Roztoka

== Population ==
Population statistic (10 years)
Year	1995	2005	2015	2025
Count	88	65	63	59
Difference		−26.13%	−3.07%	−6.34%

Population statistic
Year	2024	2025
Count	52	59
Difference		+13.46%

It has a population of 59 people (31 December 2025).

=== Ethnicity ===
Census 2021 (1+ %)
Ethnicity	Number	Fraction
Slovak	42	73.68%
Rusyn	38	66.66%
Ukrainian	3	5.26%
Not found out	2	3.5%
Total	57	

In year 2021 was 57 people by ethnicity 42 as Slovak, 38 as Rusyn, 3 as Ukrainian and 2 as Not found out.

Note on population: The difference values of population numbers in the table "Population statistic" and in the sections "Ethnicity" & "Religion" is caused by the use of various statistical methods.

=== Religion ===
Census 2021 (1+ %)
Religion	Number	Fraction
Eastern Orthodox Church	41	71.93%
Greek Catholic Church	10	17.54%
None	4	7.02%
Roman Catholic Church	2	3.51%
Total	57	

In year 2021 was 57 people by religion 41 from Eastern Orthodox Church, 10 from Greek Catholic Church, 4 from None and 2 from Roman Catholic Church.
