= Kolonica =

Village in Slovakia

- Municipality
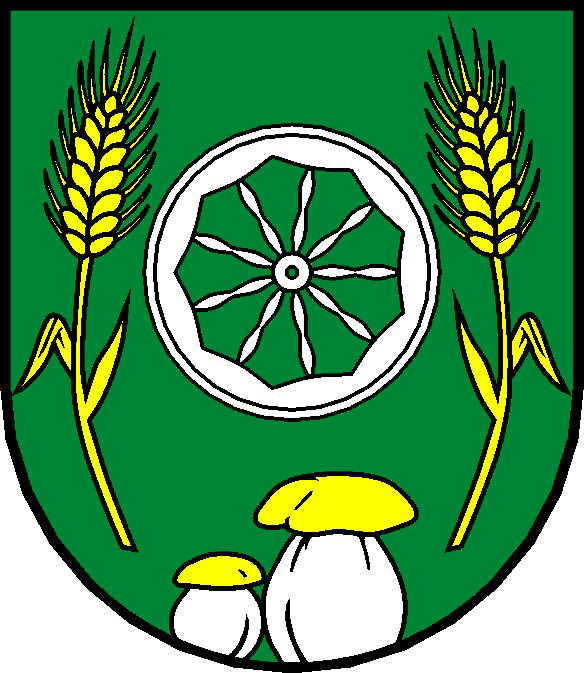
- Flag Coat of arms

- Location of Kolonica in the Prešov Region Location of Kolonica in Slovakia
- Coordinates: 48.97°N 22.27°E
- Country: Slovakia
- Region: Prešov Region
- District: Snina District
- First mentioned: 1567

Area
  - Total: 27.18 km^{2} (10.49 sq mi)
- Elevation: 358 m (1,175 ft)

Population (2025)
  - Total: 521
- Time zone: UTC+1 (CET)
  - Summer (DST): UTC+2 (CEST)
- Postal code: 676 1
- Area code: +421 57
- Vehicle registration plate (until 2022): SV
- Website: www.obeckolonica.sk

Kolonica (Hungarian: Kiskolon, Rusyn: Колоніця) is a village and municipality in the Snina District of the Prešov Region of north-eastern Slovakia. It has a population of about 600 people.

== History ==
In historical records the village was first mentioned in 1567. Before the establishment of independent Czechoslovakia in 1918, Kolonica was part of Zemplén County within the Kingdom of Hungary. In 1939, it was for a short time part of the Slovak Republic. From 1939 to 1944, as a result of the Slovak–Hungarian War of 1939, it was again part of Hungary. In 1944, the Red Army entered Kolonica and it was once again part of Czechoslovakia.

== Observatory ==
Just east of the village is a Soviet-manufactured one-metre telescope, the biggest telescope in Slovakia, used for observing variable stars.

== Geography ==
Kolonica is around 80 km east of Košice, lies at a height of 358 metres and covers an area of 27.18 km².

== Population ==
Population statistic (10 years)
Year	1995	2005	2015	2025
Count	613	592	576	521
Difference		−3.42%	−2.70%	−9.54%

Population statistic
Year	2024	2025
Count	526	521
Difference		−0.95%

It has a population of 521 people (31 December 2025).

=== Ethnicity ===
Census 2021 (1+ %)
Ethnicity	Number	Fraction
Slovak	460	85.5%
Rusyn	300	55.76%
Not found out	13	2.41%
Total	538	

In year 2021 was 538 people by ethnicity 460 as Slovak, 300 as Rusyn, 13 as Not found out, 4 as Czech, 2 as Hungarian, 1 as Romanian and 1 as Other.

Note on population: The difference values of population numbers in the table "Population statistic" and in the sections "Ethnicity" & "Religion" is caused by the use of various statistical methods.

=== Religion ===
Census 2021 (1+ %)
Religion	Number	Fraction
Greek Catholic Church	411	76.39%
Jehovah's Witnesses	55	10.22%
Roman Catholic Church	42	7.81%
None	14	2.6%
Eastern Orthodox Church	12	2.23%
Total	538	

In year 2021 was 538 people by religion 411 from Greek Catholic Church, 55 from Jehovah's Witnesses, 42 from Roman Catholic Church, 14 from None, 12 from Eastern Orthodox Church, 3 from Not found out and 1 from Paganism and natural spirituality.
