= Ladomirov =

- Municipality
- Flag

- Location of Ladomirov in the Prešov Region Location of Ladomirov in Slovakia
- Coordinates: 48.93°N 22.32°E
- Country: Slovakia
- Region: Prešov Region
- District: Snina District
- First mentioned: 1567

Area
  - Total: 15.24 km^{2} (5.88 sq mi)
- Elevation: 308 m (1,010 ft)

Population (2025)
  - Total: 239
- Time zone: UTC+1 (CET)
  - Summer (DST): UTC+2 (CEST)
- Postal code: 677 1
- Area code: +421 57
- Vehicle registration plate (until 2022): SV
- Website: www.obecladomirov.sk

Ladomirov (Hungarian: Ladomér, Rusyn: Ладомирів) is a village and municipality in Snina District in the Prešov Region of north-eastern Slovakia.

== History ==
Ladomirov was first mentioned in historical records in 1567. Before the establishment of independent Czechoslovakia in 1918, Ladomirov was part of Zemplén County within the Kingdom of Hungary. In 1939, it was for a short time part of the Slovak Republic. As a result of the Slovak–Hungarian War of 1939, it was from 1939 to 1944 again part of Hungary. In the autumn of 1944, the Red Army entered Ladomirov and it was once again part of Czechoslovakia.

== Geography ==
The municipality lies at an altitude of 308 metres (1,010 ft) and covers an area of 15.24 km^{2} (5.88 sq mi) (2025).

== Population ==
Population statistic (10 years)
Year	1995	2005	2015	2025
Count	371	343	275	239
Difference		−7.54%	−19.82%	−13.09%

Population statistic
Year	2024	2025
Count	251	239
Difference		−4.78%

It has a population of 239 people (31 December 2025).

=== Ethnicity ===
Census 2021 (1+ %)
Ethnicity	Number	Fraction
Slovak	198	74.15%
Rusyn	114	42.69%
Not found out	10	3.74%
Ukrainian	5	1.87%
Romani	4	1.49%
Total	267	

In year 2021 was 267 people by ethnicity 198 as Slovak, 114 as Rusyn, 10 as Not found out, 5 as Ukrainian, 4 as Romani and 2 as Hungarian.

Note on population: The difference values of population numbers in the table "Population statistic" and in the sections "Ethnicity" & "Religion" is caused by the use of various statistical methods.

=== Religion ===
Census 2021 (1+ %)
Religion	Number	Fraction
Greek Catholic Church	168	62.92%
Eastern Orthodox Church	64	23.97%
None	19	7.12%
Roman Catholic Church	8	3%
Not found out	7	2.62%
Total	267	

In year 2021 was 267 people by religion 168 from Greek Catholic Church, 64 from Eastern Orthodox Church, 19 from None, 8 from Roman Catholic Church, 7 from Not found out and 1 from Jehovah's Witnesses.
