= Parihuzovce =

- Municipality
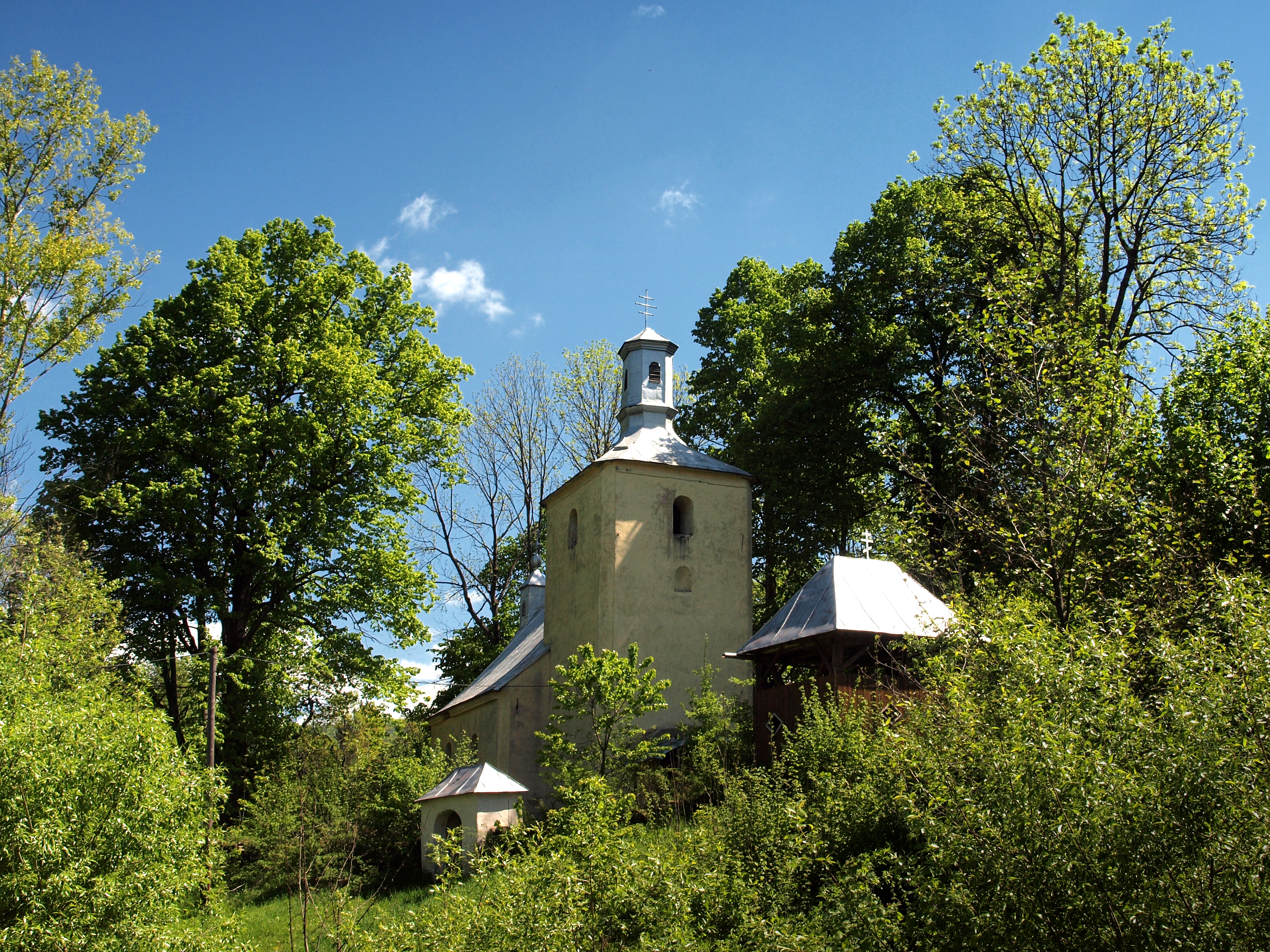

- Flag

- Location of Parihuzovce in the Prešov Region Location of Parihuzovce in Slovakia
- Coordinates: 49.12°N 22.20°E
- Country: Slovakia
- Region: Prešov Region
- District: Snina District
- First mentioned: 1567

Area
  - Total: 9.52 km^{2} (3.68 sq mi)
- Elevation: 428 m (1,404 ft)

Population (2025)
  - Total: 27
- Time zone: UTC+1 (CET)
  - Summer (DST): UTC+2 (CEST)
- Postal code: 673 5
- Area code: +421 57
- Vehicle registration plate (until 2022): SV

Parihuzovce (Hungarian: Juhos, Rusyn: Паризівцї) is a village and municipality in Snina District in the Prešov Region of north-eastern Slovakia.

== History ==
In historical records the village was first mentioned in 1567. Before the establishment of independent Czechoslovakia in 1918, Parizuhovce was part of Zemplén County within the Kingdom of Hungary. From 1939 to 1944, it was part of the Slovak Republic. In the autumn of 1944, the Red Army dislodged the Wehrmacht from Parihuzovce and it was once again part of Czechoslovakia.

== Geography ==
The municipality lies at an altitude of 428 metres (1,404 ft) and covers an area of 9.52 km^{2} (3.68 sq mi) (2025).

== Population ==
Population statistic (10 years)
Year	1995	2005	2015	2025
Count	40	25	29	27
Difference		−37.5%	+16%	−6.89%

Population statistic
Year	2024	2025
Count	27	27
Difference		+0%

It has a population of 27 people (31 December 2025).

=== Ethnicity ===
Census 2021 (1+ %)
Ethnicity	Number	Fraction
Slovak	15	75%
Rusyn	8	40%
Not found out	2	10%
Ukrainian	1	5%
Total	20	

In year 2021 was 20 people by ethnicity 15 as Slovak, 8 as Rusyn, 2 as Not found out and 1 as Ukrainian.

Note on population: The difference values of population numbers in the table "Population statistic" and in the sections "Ethnicity" & "Religion" is caused by the use of various statistical methods.

=== Religion ===
Census 2021 (1+ %)
Religion	Number	Fraction
Eastern Orthodox Church	8	40%
Greek Catholic Church	6	30%
Roman Catholic Church	2	10%
Not found out	2	10%
None	2	10%
Total	20	

In year 2021 was 20 people by religion 8 from Eastern Orthodox Church, 6 from Greek Catholic Church, 2 from Roman Catholic Church, 2 from Not found out and 2 from None.
