= Ulič =

- Municipality
- Flag Coat of arms

- Location of Ulič in the Prešov Region Location of Ulič in Slovakia
- Coordinates: 48.97°N 22.43°E
- Country: Slovakia
- Region: Prešov Region
- District: Snina District
- First mentioned: 1451

Area
  - Total: 24.98 km^{2} (9.64 sq mi)
- Elevation: 249 m (817 ft)

Population (2025)
  - Total: 802
- Time zone: UTC+1 (CET)
  - Summer (DST): UTC+2 (CEST)
- Postal code: 676 7
- Area code: +421 57
- Vehicle registration plate (until 2022): SV
- Website: www.obeculic.sk

Ulič (Hungarian: Utcás, Rusyn: Уліч) is a village and municipality in Snina District in the Prešov Region of north-eastern Slovakia.

== History ==
In historical records the village was first mentioned in 1451. Before the establishment of independent Czechoslovakia in 1918, Ulič was part of Zemplén County within the Kingdom of Hungary. In 1939, it was for a short time part of the Slovak Republic. From 1939 to 1944, as a result of the Slovak–Hungarian War of 1939, it was again part of Hungary. On 26 October 1944, the Red Army entered Ulič and it was once again part of Czechoslovakia.

== Geography ==
The municipality lies at an altitude of 249 metres (817 ft) and covers an area of 24.98 km^{2} (9.64 sq mi) (2025).

== Population ==
Population statistic (10 years)
Year	1995	2005	2015	2025
Count	1135	1017	891	802
Difference		−10.39%	−12.38%	−9.98%

Population statistic
Year	2024	2025
Count	808	802
Difference		−0.74%

It has a population of 802 people (31 December 2025).

=== Ethnicity ===
Census 2021 (1+ %)
Ethnicity	Number	Fraction
Slovak	645	78.18%
Rusyn	425	51.51%
Romani	55	6.66%
Not found out	35	4.24%
Ukrainian	16	1.93%
Total	825	

In year 2021 was 825 people by ethnicity 645 as Slovak, 425 as Rusyn, 55 as Romani, 35 as Not found out, 16 as Ukrainian, 7 as Czech, 5 as Other, 1 as Russian and 1 as Polish.

Note on population: The difference values of population numbers in the table "Population statistic" and in the sections "Ethnicity" & "Religion" is caused by the use of various statistical methods.

=== Religion ===
Census 2021 (1+ %)
Religion	Number	Fraction
Eastern Orthodox Church	338	40.97%
Greek Catholic Church	232	28.12%
None	119	14.42%
Jehovah's Witnesses	70	8.48%
Roman Catholic Church	28	3.39%
Not found out	28	3.39%
Total	825	

In year 2021 was 825 people by religion 338 from Eastern Orthodox Church, 232 from Greek Catholic Church, 119 from None, 70 from Jehovah's Witnesses, 28 from Roman Catholic Church, 28 from Not found out, 5 from Ad hoc movements, 1 from Calvinist Church, 1 from Other and not ascertained christian church, 1 from Islam, 1 from Other and 1 from Church of Jesus Christ of Latter-day Saints.
