= Kalná Roztoka =

- Municipality
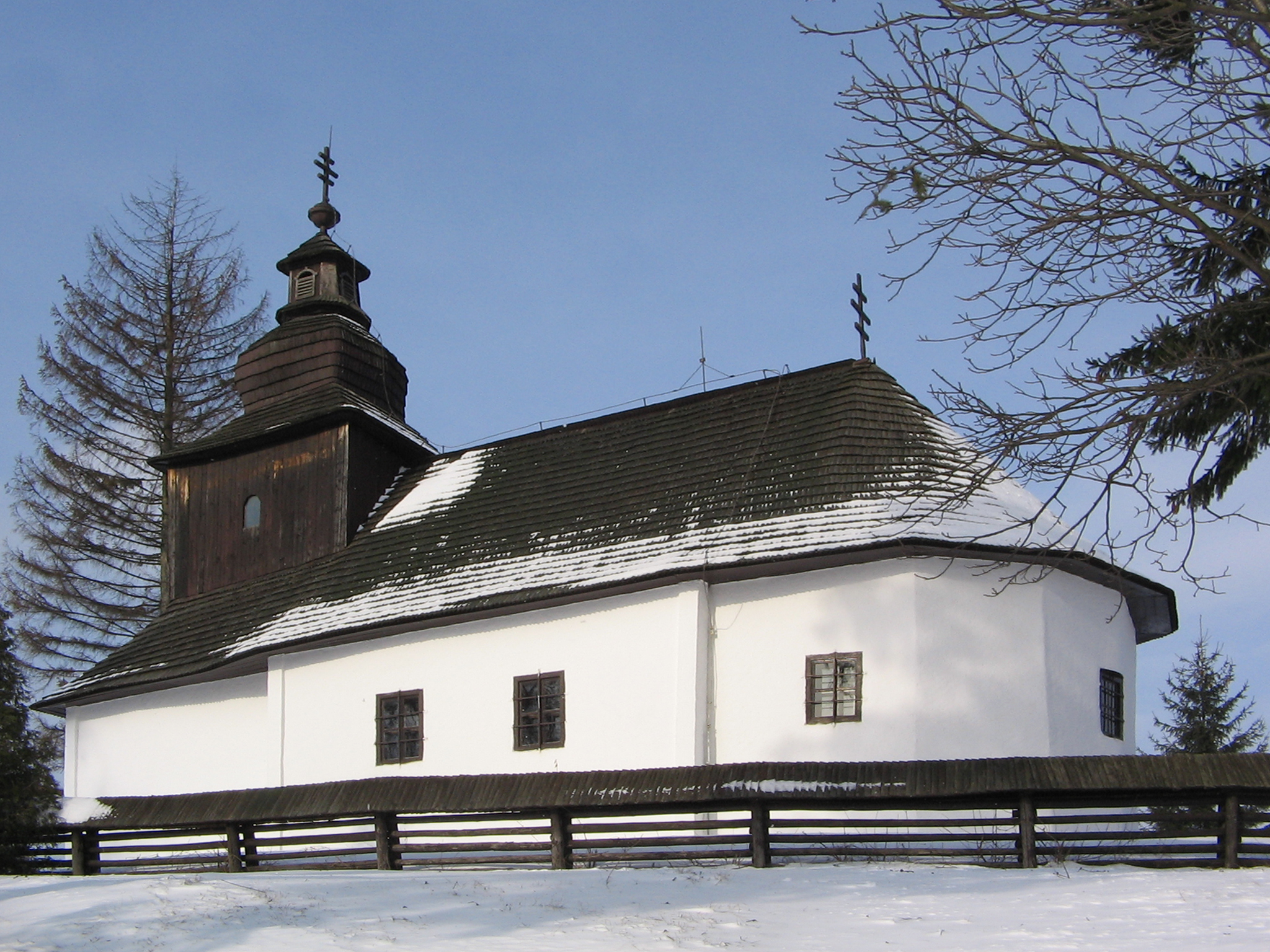
- Wooden church in Kalná Roztoka

- Flag

- Location of Kalná Roztoka in the Prešov Region Location of Kalná Roztoka in Slovakia
- Coordinates: 48.97°N 22.32°E
- Country: Slovakia
- Region: Prešov Region
- District: Snina District
- First mentioned: 1568

Area
  - Total: 22.75 km^{2} (8.78 sq mi)
- Elevation: 268 m (879 ft)

Population (2025)
  - Total: 511
- Time zone: UTC+1 (CET)
  - Summer (DST): UTC+2 (CEST)
- Postal code: 677 2
- Area code: +421 57
- Vehicle registration plate (until 2022): SV
- Website: kalnaroztoka.estranky.sk

Kalná Roztoka (Hungarian: Kálnarosztoka, Rusyn: Кална Розтока) is a village and municipality in Snina District in the Prešov Region of north-eastern Slovakia.

== History ==
In historical records, the village was first mentioned around 1554 to 1568. In 1877, the villages of Kalná and Roztoka came together to form the current village. Before the establishment of independent Czechoslovakia in 1918, Kalná Roztoka was part of Zemplén County within the Kingdom of Hungary. In 1939, it was for a short time part of the Slovak Republic. As a result of the Slovak–Hungarian War of 1939, it was from 1939 to 1944 again part of Hungary. In the autumn of 1944, the Red Army entered Kalná Roztoka and it was once again part of Czechoslovakia.

The village is known for its wooden church, which dates back to the early-mid 18th century. The church is constructed of wood, but has white-washed clay plaster on the exterior walls, thus giving the appearance of a masonry building. It is the only Lemko Rusyn church of this sort.

== Geography ==
The municipality lies at an altitude of 268 metres (879 ft) and covers an area of 22.75 km^{2} (8.78 sq mi) (2025).

== Population ==
Population statistic (10 years)
Year	1995	2005	2015	2025
Count	686	595	581	511
Difference		−13.26%	−2.35%	−12.04%

Population statistic
Year	2024	2025
Count	510	511
Difference		+0.19%

It has a population of 511 people (31 December 2025).

=== Ethnicity ===
Census 2021 (1+ %)
Ethnicity	Number	Fraction
Slovak	390	72.35%
Rusyn	330	61.22%
Romani	25	4.63%
Not found out	11	2.04%
Total	539	

In year 2021 was 539 people by ethnicity 390 as Slovak, 330 as Rusyn, 25 as Romani, 11 as Not found out, 4 as Czech, 3 as Ukrainian, 3 as Other, 1 as Russian and 1 as Hungarian.

Note on population: The difference values of population numbers in the table "Population statistic" and in the sections "Ethnicity" & "Religion" is caused by the use of various statistical methods.

=== Religion ===
Census 2021 (1+ %)
Religion	Number	Fraction
Eastern Orthodox Church	333	61.78%
Greek Catholic Church	153	28.39%
Roman Catholic Church	30	5.57%
None	12	2.23%
Not found out	9	1.67%
Total	539	

In year 2021 was 539 people by religion 333 from Eastern Orthodox Church, 153 from Greek Catholic Church, 30 from Roman Catholic Church, 12 from None, 9 from Not found out, 1 from Islam and 1 from Evangelical Church.
