= Klenová (Snina District) =

- Municipality
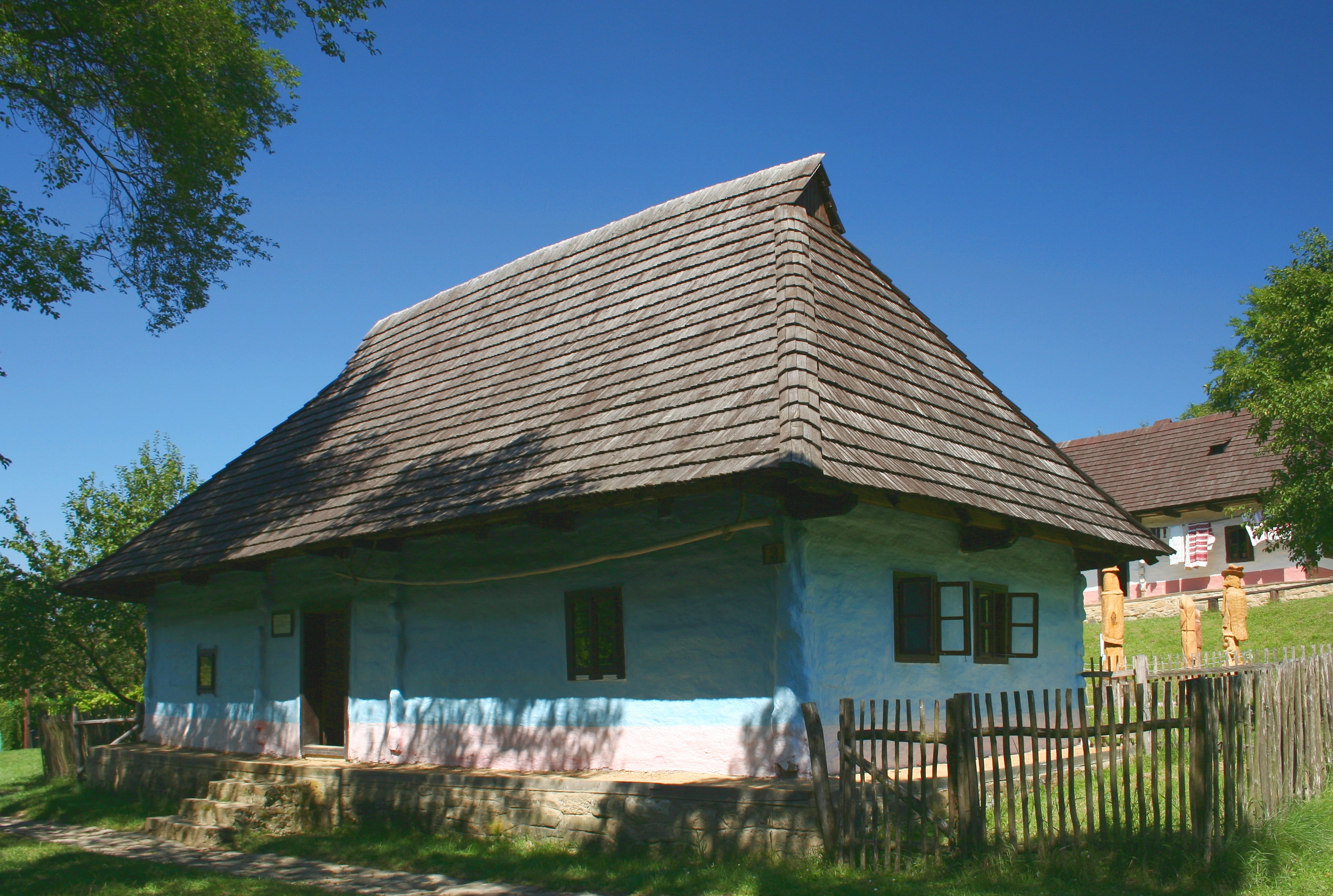

- Flag

- Location of Klenová in the Prešov Region Location of Klenová in Slovakia
- Coordinates: 48.95°N 22.33°E
- Country: Slovakia
- Region: Prešov Region
- District: Snina District
- First mentioned: 1548

Area
  - Total: 20.03 km^{2} (7.73 sq mi)
- Elevation: 249 m (817 ft)

Population (2025)
  - Total: 492
- Time zone: UTC+1 (CET)
  - Summer (DST): UTC+2 (CEST)
- Postal code: 677 2
- Area code: +421 57
- Vehicle registration plate (until 2022): SV
- Website: www.obecklenova.sk

Klenová (Hungarian: Kelen, Rusyn: Кленова) is a village and municipality in Snina District in the Prešov Region of north-eastern Slovakia.

== History ==
In historical records the village was first mentioned in 1548. Before the establishment of independent Czechoslovakia in 1918, Klenová was part of Zemplén County within the Kingdom of Hungary. In 1939, it was for a short time part of the Slovak Republic. As a result of the Slovak–Hungarian War of 1939, it was from 1939 to 1944 again part of Hungary. In the autumn of 1944, the Red Army entered Klenová and it was once again part of Czechoslovakia.

== Geography ==
The municipality lies at an altitude of 249 metres (817 ft) and covers an area of 20.03 km^{2} (7.73 sq mi) (2025).

== Population ==
Population statistic (10 years)
Year	1995	2005	2015	2025
Count	513	527	517	492
Difference		+2.72%	−1.89%	−4.83%

Population statistic
Year	2024	2025
Count	496	492
Difference		−0.80%

It has a population of 492 people (31 December 2025).

=== Ethnicity ===
Census 2021 (1+ %)
Ethnicity	Number	Fraction
Slovak	383	75.39%
Rusyn	331	65.15%
Not found out	28	5.51%
Ukrainian	13	2.55%
Romani	12	2.36%
Total	508	

In year 2021 was 508 people by ethnicity 383 as Slovak, 331 as Rusyn, 28 as Not found out, 13 as Ukrainian, 12 as Romani, 3 as Czech and 2 as Russian.

Note on population: The difference values of population numbers in the table "Population statistic" and in the sections "Ethnicity" & "Religion" is caused by the use of various statistical methods.

=== Religion ===
Census 2021 (1+ %)
Religion	Number	Fraction
Eastern Orthodox Church	358	70.47%
Greek Catholic Church	107	21.06%
None	24	4.72%
Roman Catholic Church	9	1.77%
Not found out	6	1.18%
Total	508	

In year 2021 was 508 people by religion 358 from Eastern Orthodox Church, 107 from Greek Catholic Church, 24 from None, 9 from Roman Catholic Church, 6 from Not found out, 2 from Jehovah's Witnesses, 1 from Calvinist Church and 1 from Evangelical Church.
