= Brestov =

Brestov may refer to:

- Brestov in Humenné District, Slovakia
- Brestov in Prešov District, Slovakia
- Brestov nad Laborcom in Medzilaborce District, Slovakia
