= Výrava =

Výrava is the name of multiple settlements:

- Výrava (Medzilaborce District), village in Slovakia
- Výrava (Hradec Králové District), village in Czech Republic
