= Roškovce =

- Municipality
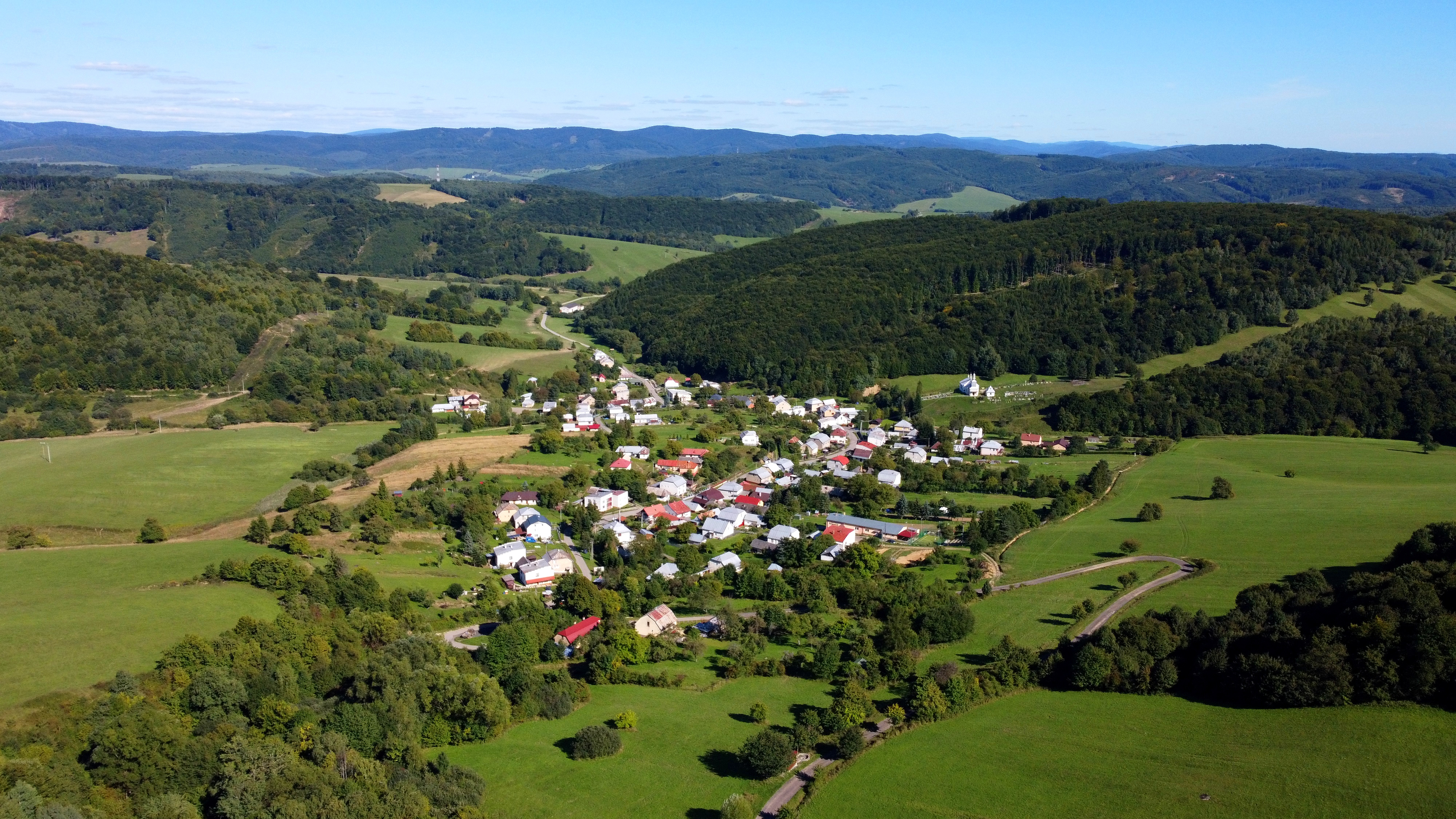

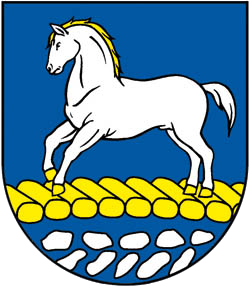
- Flag Coat of arms

- Location of Roškovce in the Prešov Region Location of Roškovce in Slovakia
- Coordinates: 49.23°N 21.85°E
- Country: Slovakia
- Region: Prešov Region
- District: Medzilaborce District
- First mentioned: 1478

Area
  - Total: 12.57 km^{2} (4.85 sq mi)
- Elevation: 357 m (1,171 ft)

Population (2025)
  - Total: 133
- Time zone: UTC+1 (CET)
  - Summer (DST): UTC+2 (CEST)
- Postal code: 670 3
- Area code: +421 57
- Vehicle registration plate (until 2022): ML
- Website: roskovce.sk

Roškovce (Rusyn: Рошківцї, Hungarian: Roskóc) is a village and municipality in the Medzilaborce District in the Prešov Region of far north-eastern Slovakia.

== History ==
In historical records the village was first mentioned in 1478. Before the establishment of independent Czechoslovakia in 1918, it was part of Zemplén County within the Kingdom of Hungary.

== Geography ==
The municipality lies at an altitude of 357 metres (1,171 ft) and covers an area of 12.57 km^{2} (4.85 sq mi) (2025).

== Population ==
Population statistic (10 years)
Year	1995	2005	2015	2025
Count	249	214	179	133
Difference		−14.05%	−16.35%	−25.69%

Population statistic
Year	2024	2025
Count	132	133
Difference		+0.75%

It has a population of 133 people (31 December 2025).

=== Ethnicity ===
Census 2021 (1+ %)
Ethnicity	Number	Fraction
Rusyn	104	73.75%
Slovak	90	63.82%
Not found out	6	4.25%
Total	141	

In year 2021 was 141 people by ethnicity 104 as Rusyn, 90 as Slovak, 6 as Not found out and 1 as Ukrainian.

Note on population: The difference values of population numbers in the table "Population statistic" and in the sections "Ethnicity" & "Religion" is caused by the use of various statistical methods.

=== Religion ===
Census 2021 (1+ %)
Religion	Number	Fraction
Greek Catholic Church	133	94.33%
Not found out	4	2.84%
Roman Catholic Church	3	2.13%
Total	141	

In year 2021 was 141 people by religion 133 from Greek Catholic Church, 4 from Not found out, 3 from Roman Catholic Church and 1 from None.
