= Sukov =

- Municipality
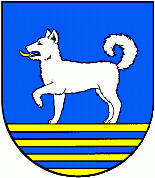
- Flag Coat of arms

- Location of Sukov in the Prešov Region Location of Sukov in Slovakia
- Coordinates: 49.22°N 21.88°E
- Country: Slovakia
- Region: Prešov Region
- District: Medzilaborce District
- First mentioned: 1557

Area
  - Total: 8.18 km^{2} (3.16 sq mi)
- Elevation: 290 m (950 ft)

Population (2025)
  - Total: 146
- Time zone: UTC+1 (CET)
  - Summer (DST): UTC+2 (CEST)
- Postal code: 670 2
- Area code: +421 57
- Vehicle registration plate (until 2022): ML
- Website: www.sukov.sk

Sukov (Slovak pronunciation: [ˈsukɔw]; Rusyn: Суків, Hungarian: Szukó) is a village and municipality in the Medzilaborce District in the Prešov Region of far north-eastern Slovakia.

== History ==
In historical records the village was first mentioned in 1557. Before the establishment of independent Czechoslovakia in 1918, it was part of Zemplén County within the Kingdom of Hungary.

== Geography ==
The municipality lies at an altitude of 290 metres (950 ft) and covers an area of 8.18 km^{2} (3.16 sq mi) (2025).

== Population ==
Population statistic (10 years)
Year	1995	2005	2015	2025
Count	132	133	135	146
Difference		+0.75%	+1.50%	+8.14%

Population statistic
Year	2024	2025
Count	149	146
Difference		−2.01%

It has a population of 146 people (31 December 2025).

=== Ethnicity ===
Census 2021 (1+ %)
Ethnicity	Number	Fraction
Slovak	100	65.35%
Rusyn	69	45.09%
Not found out	8	5.22%
Czech	2	1.3%
Romani	2	1.3%
Russian	2	1.3%
Total	153	

In year 2021 was 153 people by ethnicity 100 as Slovak, 69 as Rusyn, 8 as Not found out, 2 as Czech, 2 as Romani, 2 as Russian and 1 as Ukrainian.

Note on population: The difference values of population numbers in the table "Population statistic" and in the sections "Ethnicity" & "Religion" is caused by the use of various statistical methods.

=== Religion ===
Census 2021 (1+ %)
Religion	Number	Fraction
Eastern Orthodox Church	73	47.71%
Greek Catholic Church	53	34.64%
Roman Catholic Church	12	7.84%
Not found out	7	4.58%
None	6	3.92%
Total	153	

In year 2021 was 153 people by religion 73 from Eastern Orthodox Church, 53 from Greek Catholic Church, 12 from Roman Catholic Church, 7 from Not found out, 6 from None, 1 from Calvinist Church and 1 from Evangelical Church.
