= Zbudská Belá =

Village and municipality in Slovakia

- Municipality
- Flag

- Location of Zbudská Belá in the Prešov Region Location of Zbudská Belá in Slovakia
- Coordinates: 49.15°N 21.95°E
- Country: Slovakia
- Region: Prešov Region
- District: Medzilaborce District
- First mentioned: 1463

Area
  - Total: 15.97 km^{2} (6.17 sq mi)
- Elevation: 263 m (863 ft)

Population (2025)
  - Total: 120
- Time zone: UTC+1 (CET)
  - Summer (DST): UTC+2 (CEST)
- Postal code: 670 1
- Area code: +421 57
- Vehicle registration plate (until 2022): ML
- Website: www.zbudskabela.sk

Zbudská Belá (Rusyn: Збудьска Біла, Hungarian: Izbugyabéla) is a village and municipality in the Medzilaborce District in the Prešov Region of far north-eastern Slovakia.

== History ==
In historical records the village was first mentioned in 1463. Before the establishment of independent Czechoslovakia in 1918, it was part of Zemplén County within the Kingdom of Hungary.

== Geography ==
The municipality lies at an altitude of 263 metres (863 ft) and covers an area of 15.97 km^{2} (6.17 sq mi) (2025).

== Population ==
Population statistic (10 years)
Year	1995	2005	2015	2025
Count	175	125	130	120
Difference		−28.57%	+4%	−7.69%

Population statistic
Year	2024	2025
Count	114	120
Difference		+5.26%

It has a population of 120 people (31 December 2025).

=== Ethnicity ===
Census 2021 (1+ %)
Ethnicity	Number	Fraction
Rusyn	72	62.06%
Slovak	67	57.75%
Not found out	4	3.44%
Total	116	

In year 2021 was 116 people by ethnicity 72 as Rusyn, 67 as Slovak and 4 as Not found out.

Note on population: The difference values of population numbers in the table "Population statistic" and in the sections "Ethnicity" & "Religion" is caused by the use of various statistical methods.

=== Religion ===
Census 2021 (1+ %)
Religion	Number	Fraction
Eastern Orthodox Church	59	50.86%
Greek Catholic Church	29	25%
Roman Catholic Church	12	10.34%
None	12	10.34%
Not found out	4	3.45%
Total	116	

In year 2021 was 116 people by religion 59 from Eastern Orthodox Church, 29 from Greek Catholic Church, 12 from Roman Catholic Church, 12 from None and 4 from Not found out.
