= Zbojné =

- Municipality
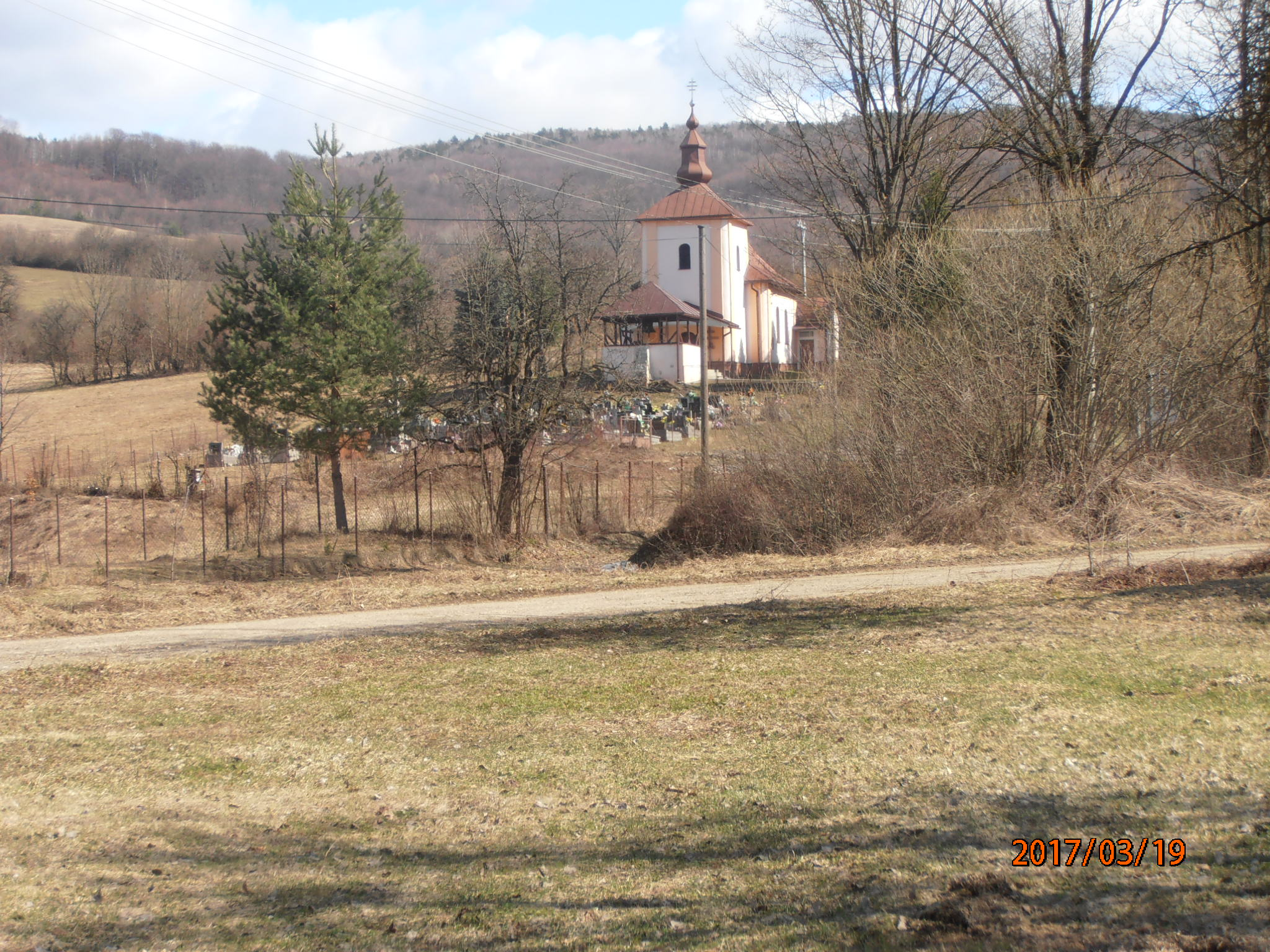

- Flag

- Location of Zbojné in the Prešov Region Location of Zbojné in Slovakia
- Coordinates: 49.13°N 22.00°E
- Country: Slovakia
- Region: Prešov Region
- District: Medzilaborce District
- First mentioned: 1463

Area
  - Total: 18.15 km^{2} (7.01 sq mi)
- Elevation: 262 m (860 ft)

Population (2025)
  - Total: 163
- Time zone: UTC+1 (CET)
  - Summer (DST): UTC+2 (CEST)
- Postal code: 671 4
- Area code: +421 57
- Vehicle registration plate (until 2022): ML
- Website: www.zbojne.sk

Zbojné (Rusyn: Збійне, Hungarian: Bajna) is a village and municipality in the Medzilaborce District in the Prešov Region of far north-eastern Slovakia.

== History ==
In historical records the village was first mentioned in 1463. Before the establishment of independent Czechoslovakia in 1918, it was part of Zemplén County within the Kingdom of Hungary.

== Geography ==
The municipality lies at an altitude of 262 metres (860 ft) and covers an area of 18.15 km^{2} (7.01 sq mi) (2025).

== Population ==
Population statistic (10 years)
Year	1995	2005	2015	2025
Count	259	194	175	163
Difference		−25.09%	−9.79%	−6.85%

Population statistic
Year	2024	2025
Count	161	163
Difference		+1.24%

It has a population of 163 people (31 December 2025).

=== Ethnicity ===
Census 2021 (1+ %)
Ethnicity	Number	Fraction
Slovak	107	66.04%
Rusyn	103	63.58%
Ukrainian	7	4.32%
Not found out	6	3.7%
Total	162	

In year 2021 was 162 people by ethnicity 107 as Slovak, 103 as Rusyn, 7 as Ukrainian and 6 as Not found out.

Note on population: The difference values of population numbers in the table "Population statistic" and in the sections "Ethnicity" & "Religion" is caused by the use of various statistical methods.

=== Religion ===
Census 2021 (1+ %)
Religion	Number	Fraction
Greek Catholic Church	130	80.25%
Roman Catholic Church	12	7.41%
Eastern Orthodox Church	8	4.94%
Not found out	5	3.09%
None	5	3.09%
Total	162	

In year 2021 was 162 people by religion 130 from Greek Catholic Church, 12 from Roman Catholic Church, 8 from Eastern Orthodox Church, 5 from Not found out, 5 from None, 1 from Evangelical Church and 1 from Ad hoc movements.

== Gallery ==
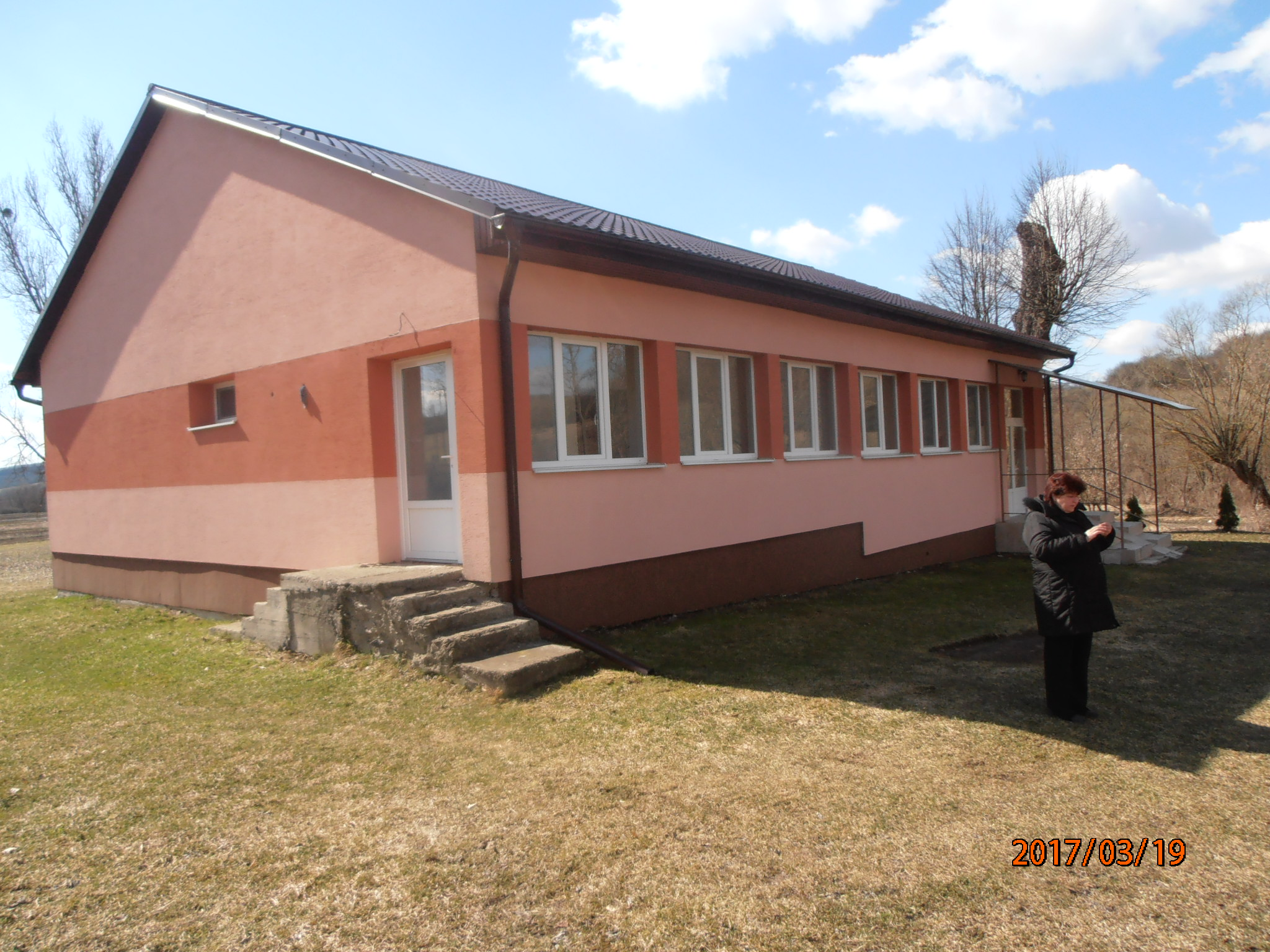
Former primary school building in Zbojné, now converted into the municipality's funeral home
