= Čabiny =

- Municipality
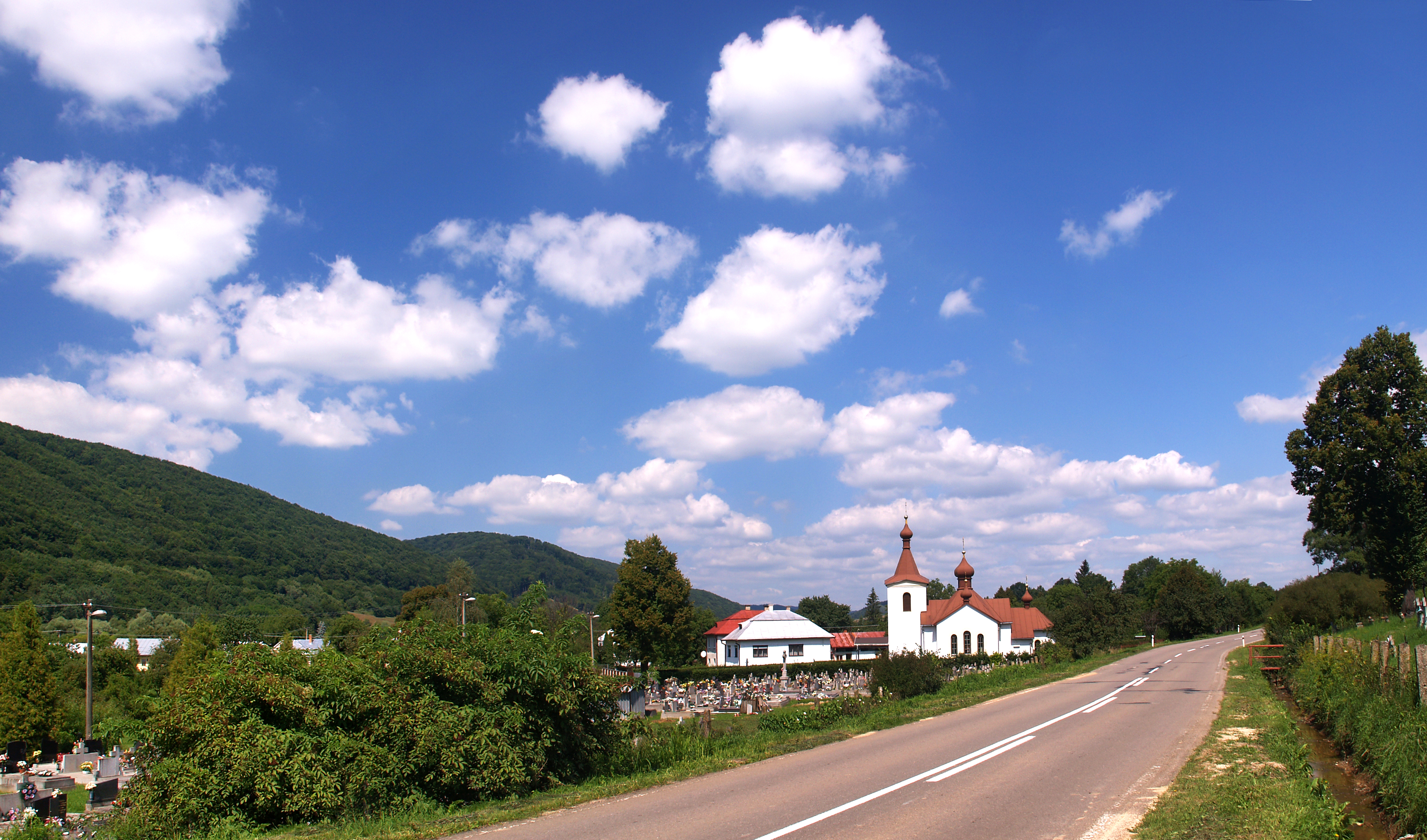
- Panorama of the village with Orthodox church

- Flag

- Location of Čabiny in the Prešov Region Location of Čabiny in Slovakia
- Coordinates: 49.18°N 21.90°E
- Country: Slovakia
- Region: Prešov Region
- District: Medzilaborce District
- First mentioned: 1478

Area
  - Total: 38.84 km^{2} (15.00 sq mi)
- Elevation: 253 m (830 ft)

Population (2025)
  - Total: 286
- Time zone: UTC+1 (CET)
  - Summer (DST): UTC+2 (CEST)
- Postal code: 670 2
- Area code: +421 57
- Vehicle registration plate (until 2022): ML
- Website: www.cabiny.sk

Čabiny (Rusyn: Чабины, Ukrainian: Чабини; Hungarian: Csebény) is a village and municipality in the Medzilaborce District in the Prešov Region of far north-eastern Slovakia.

== History ==
In historical records the village was first mentioned in 1478. Before the establishment of independent Czechoslovakia in 1918, it was part of Zemplén County within the Kingdom of Hungary.

== Geography ==
The municipality lies at an altitude of 253 metres (830 ft) and covers an area of 38.84 km^{2} (15.00 sq mi) (2025).

== Population ==
Population statistic (10 years)
Year	1995	2005	2015	2025
Count	438	398	374	286
Difference		−9.13%	−6.03%	−23.52%

Population statistic
Year	2024	2025
Count	280	286
Difference		+2.14%

It has a population of 286 people (31 December 2025).

=== Ethnicity ===
Census 2021 (1+ %)
Ethnicity	Number	Fraction
Rusyn	195	60.93%
Slovak	163	50.93%
Not found out	16	5%
Ukrainian	10	3.12%
Total	320	

In year 2021 was 320 people by ethnicity 195 as Rusyn, 163 as Slovak, 16 as Not found out, 10 as Ukrainian, 3 as Romanian, 2 as Russian, 2 as English and 1 as Greek.

Note on population: The difference values of population numbers in the table "Population statistic" and in the sections "Ethnicity" & "Religion" is caused by the use of various statistical methods.

=== Religion ===
Census 2021 (1+ %)
Religion	Number	Fraction
Greek Catholic Church	152	47.5%
Eastern Orthodox Church	108	33.75%
Roman Catholic Church	23	7.19%
None	22	6.88%
Not found out	13	4.06%
Total	320	

In year 2021 was 320 people by religion 152 from Greek Catholic Church, 108 from Eastern Orthodox Church, 23 from Roman Catholic Church, 22 from None, 13 from Not found out, 1 from Evangelical Church and 1 from Ad hoc movements.

== Genealogical resources ==
The records for genealogical research are available at the state archive "Statny Archiv in Presov, Slovakia"

- Roman Catholic church records (births/marriages/deaths): 1786-1898 (parish B)
- Greek Catholic church records (births/marriages/deaths): 1799-1895 (parish A)

== Gallery ==
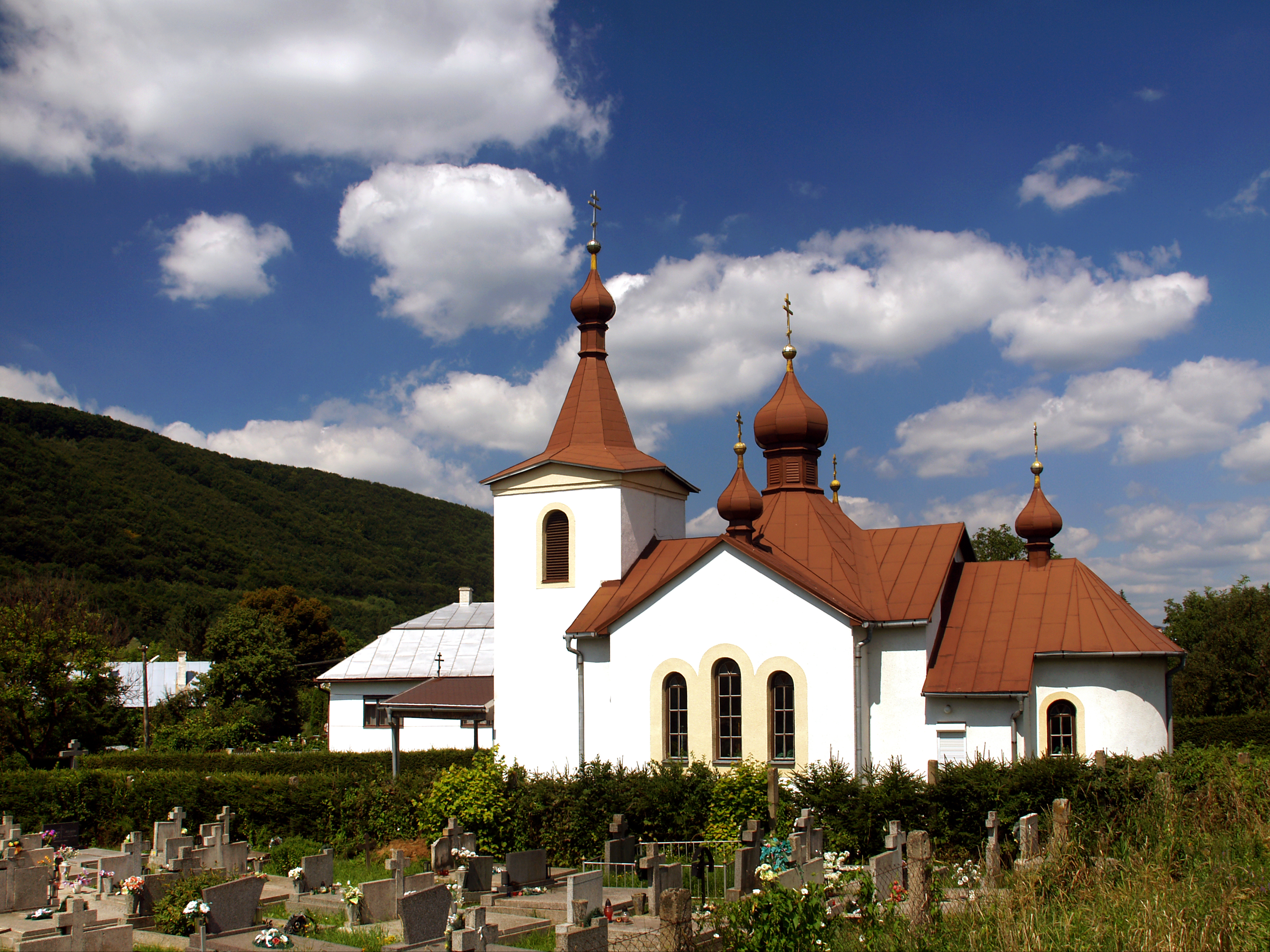
Orthodox church of the Nativity of Our Lady in Čabiny

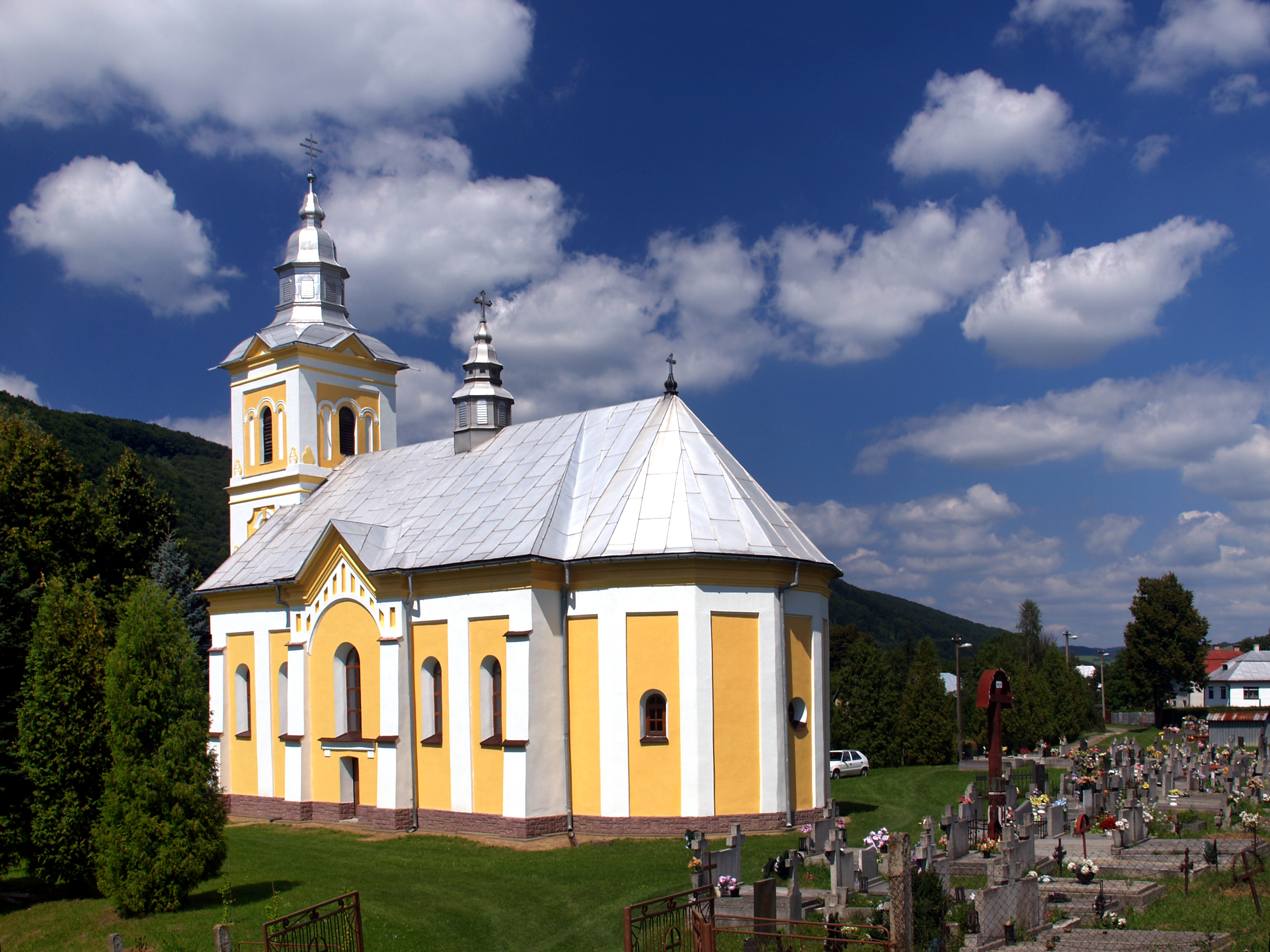
Greek Catholic Church of the Nativity of Our Lady in Čabiny

== See also ==
- List of municipalities and towns in Slovakia
