= Rokytovce =

- Municipality
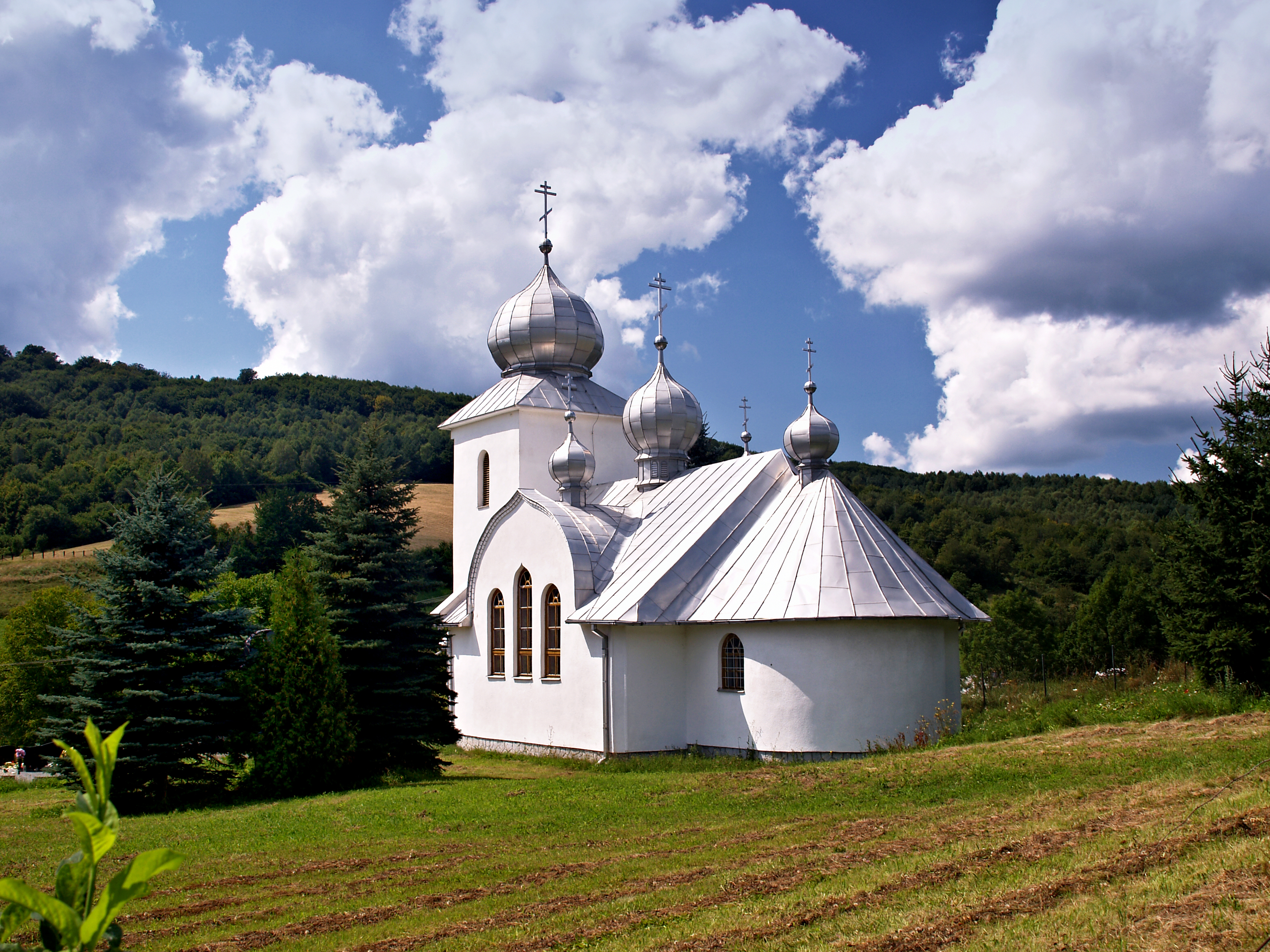

- Flag

- Location of Rokytovce in the Prešov Region Location of Rokytovce in Slovakia
- Coordinates: 49.27°N 21.88°E
- Country: Slovakia
- Region: Prešov Region
- District: Medzilaborce District
- First mentioned: 1437

Area
  - Total: 7.37 km^{2} (2.85 sq mi)
- Elevation: 343 m (1,125 ft)

Population (2025)
  - Total: 155
- Time zone: UTC+1 (CET)
  - Summer (DST): UTC+2 (CEST)
- Postal code: 670 3
- Area code: +421 57
- Vehicle registration plate (until 2022): ML
- Website: www.rokytovce.sk

Rokytovce (Rusyn: Рокытівцї, Hungarian: Rokitóc) is a village and municipality in the Medzilaborce District in the Prešov Region of far north-eastern Slovakia.

== History ==
In historical records the village was first mentioned in 1437. Before the establishment of independent Czechoslovakia in 1918, it was part of Zemplén County within the Kingdom of Hungary.

== Geography ==
The municipality lies at an altitude of 343 metres (1,125 ft) and covers an area of 7.37 km^{2} (2.85 sq mi) (2025).

== Population ==
Population statistic (10 years)
Year	1995	2005	2015	2025
Count	193	185	194	155
Difference		−4.14%	+4.86%	−20.10%

Population statistic
Year	2024	2025
Count	156	155
Difference		−0.64%

It has a population of 155 people (31 December 2025).

=== Ethnicity ===
Census 2021 (1+ %)
Ethnicity	Number	Fraction
Rusyn	113	70.18%
Slovak	69	42.85%
Romani	13	8.07%
Czech	2	1.24%
Ukrainian	2	1.24%
Total	161	

In year 2021 was 161 people by ethnicity 113 as Rusyn, 69 as Slovak, 13 as Romani, 2 as Czech, 2 as Ukrainian, 1 as Chinese and 1 as Not found out.

Note on population: The difference values of population numbers in the table "Population statistic" and in the sections "Ethnicity" & "Religion" is caused by the use of various statistical methods.

=== Religion ===
Census 2021 (1+ %)
Religion	Number	Fraction
Greek Catholic Church	73	45.34%
Eastern Orthodox Church	54	33.54%
Roman Catholic Church	21	13.04%
None	8	4.97%
Evangelical Church	3	1.86%
Total	161	

In year 2021 was 161 people by religion 73 from Greek Catholic Church, 54 from Eastern Orthodox Church, 21 from Roman Catholic Church, 8 from None, 3 from Evangelical Church, 1 from Not found out and 1 from Buddhism.
