= Oľšinkov =

Oľšinkov Вышынків
- Municipality
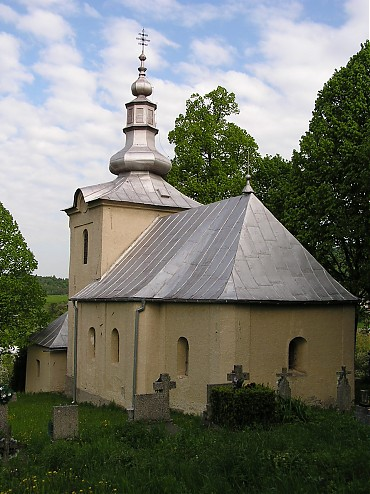

- Flag

- Location of Oľšinkov in the Prešov Region Location of Oľšinkov in Slovakia
- Coordinates: 49.20°N 22.05°E
- Country: Slovakia
- Region: Prešov Region
- District: Medzilaborce District
- First mentioned: 1567

Area
  - Total: 7.65 km^{2} (2.95 sq mi)
- Elevation: 443 m (1,453 ft)

Population (2025)
  - Total: 24
- Time zone: UTC+1 (CET)
  - Summer (DST): UTC+2 (CEST)
- Postal code: 671 6
- Area code: +421 57
- Vehicle registration plate (until 2022): ML
- Website: olsinkov.webnode.sk

Oľšinkov (Rusyn: Вышынків, Vŷšŷnkiv or Ольшынків, Oľšŷnkiv; Hungarian: Meggyfalu) is a village and municipality in the Medzilaborce District in the Prešov Region of far north-eastern Slovakia.

== History ==
In historical records the village was first mentioned in 1567. Before the establishment of independent Czechoslovakia in 1918, Oľšinkov was part of Zemplén County within the Kingdom of Hungary. From 1939 to 1944, it was part of the Slovak Republic. On 30 October 1944, the Red Army dislodged the Wehrmacht from Oľšinkov and it was once again part of Czechoslovakia.

== Geography ==
The municipality lies at an altitude of 443 metres (1,453 ft) and covers an area of 7.65 km^{2} (2.95 sq mi) (2025).

== Population ==
Population statistic (10 years)
Year	1995	2005	2015	2025
Count	56	34	28	24
Difference		−39.28%	−17.64%	−14.28%

Population statistic
Year	2024	2025
Count	22	24
Difference		+9.09%

It has a population of 24 people (31 December 2025).

=== Ethnicity ===
Census 2021 (1+%)
Ethnicity	Number	Fraction
Rusyn	17	85%
Slovak	5	25%
Ukrainian	3	15%
Not found out	1	5%
Total	20	

In year 2021 was 20 people by ethnicity 17 as Rusyn, 5 as Slovak, 3 as Ukrainian and 1 as Not found out.

Note on population: The difference values of population numbers in the table "Population statistic" and in the sections "Ethnicity" & "Religion" is caused by the use of various statistical methods.

=== Religion ===
Census 2021 (1+%)
Religion	Number	Fraction
Eastern Orthodox Church	18	90%
Greek Catholic Church	2	10%
Total	20	

In year 2021 was 20 people by religion 18 from Eastern Orthodox Church and 2 from Greek Catholic Church.
