= Valentovce =

- Municipality
- Location of Valentovce in the Prešov Region Location of Valentovce in Slovakia
- Coordinates: 49.18°N 21.97°E
- Country: Slovakia
- Region: Prešov Region
- District: Medzilaborce District
- First mentioned: 1808

Area
  - Total: 2.20 km^{2} (0.85 sq mi)
- Elevation: 330 m (1,080 ft)

Population (2025)
  - Total: 39
- Time zone: UTC+1 (CET)
  - Summer (DST): UTC+2 (CEST)
- Postal code: 670 1
- Area code: +421 57
- Vehicle registration plate (until 2022): ML

Valentovce (Rusyn: Валентівцї; Hungarian: Valentóc) is a small village and municipality in the Medzilaborce District in the Prešov Region of far north-eastern Slovakia.

== History ==
The village was established in 1808. Before the establishment of independent Czechoslovakia in 1918, it was part of Zemplén County within the Kingdom of Hungary.

== Geography ==
The municipality lies at an altitude of 330 metres (1,080 ft) and covers an area of 2.20 km^{2} (0.85 sq mi) (2025).

== Population ==
Population statistic (10 years)
Year	1995	2005	2015	2025
Count	55	38	41	39
Difference		−30.90%	+7.89%	−4.87%

Population statistic
Year	2024	2025
Count	38	39
Difference		+2.63%

It has a population of 39 people (31 December 2025).

=== Ethnicity ===
Census 2021 (1+ %)
Ethnicity	Number	Fraction
Slovak	37	88.09%
Rusyn	6	14.28%
Not found out	1	2.38%
Total	42	

In year 2021 was 42 people by ethnicity 37 as Slovak, 6 as Rusyn and 1 as Not found out.

Note on population: The difference values of population numbers in the table "Population statistic" and in the sections "Ethnicity" & "Religion" is caused by the use of various statistical methods.

=== Religion ===
Census 2021 (1+ %)
Religion	Number	Fraction
Eastern Orthodox Church	23	54.76%
Greek Catholic Church	7	16.67%
Jehovah's Witnesses	5	11.9%
None	5	11.9%
Roman Catholic Church	1	2.38%
Not found out	1	2.38%
Total	42	

In year 2021 was 42 people by religion 23 from Eastern Orthodox Church, 7 from Greek Catholic Church, 5 from Jehovah's Witnesses, 5 from None, 1 from Roman Catholic Church and 1 from Not found out.
