= Repejov =

- Municipality
- Flag

- Location of Repejov in the Prešov Region Location of Repejov in Slovakia
- Coordinates: 49.20°N 21.82°E
- Country: Slovakia
- Region: Prešov Region
- District: Medzilaborce District
- First mentioned: 1454

Area
  - Total: 18.31 km^{2} (7.07 sq mi)
- Elevation: 284 m (932 ft)

Population (2025)
  - Total: 95
- Time zone: UTC+1 (CET)
  - Summer (DST): UTC+2 (CEST)
- Postal code: 670 5
- Area code: +421 57
- Vehicle registration plate (until 2022): ML
- Website: www.repejov.sk

Repejov (Rusyn: Репеїв, Hungarian: Repejő) is a village and municipality in the Medzilaborce District in the Prešov Region of far north-eastern Slovakia.

== History ==
In historical records the village was first mentioned in 1454. Before the establishment of independent Czechoslovakia in 1918, it was part of Zemplén County within the Kingdom of Hungary.

== Geography ==
The municipality lies at an altitude of 284 metres (932 ft) and covers an area of 18.31 km^{2} (7.07 sq mi) (2025).

== Population ==
Population statistic (10 years)
Year	1995	2005	2015	2025
Count	207	149	127	95
Difference		−28.01%	−14.76%	−25.19%

Population statistic
Year	2024	2025
Count	101	95
Difference		−5.94%

It has a population of 95 people (31 December 2025).

=== Ethnicity ===
Census 2021 (1+ %)
Ethnicity	Number	Fraction
Rusyn	72	60.5%
Slovak	71	59.66%
Not found out	8	6.72%
Hungarian	3	2.52%
Ukrainian	2	1.68%
Total	119	

In year 2021 was 119 people by ethnicity 72 as Rusyn, 71 as Slovak, 8 as Not found out, 3 as Hungarian and 2 as Ukrainian.

Note on population: The difference values of population numbers in the table "Population statistic" and in the sections "Ethnicity" & "Religion" is caused by the use of various statistical methods.

=== Religion ===
Census 2021 (1+ %)
Religion	Number	Fraction
Greek Catholic Church	90	75.63%
None	11	9.24%
Not found out	9	7.56%
Roman Catholic Church	7	5.88%
Total	119	

In year 2021 was 119 people by religion 90 from Greek Catholic Church, 11 from None, 9 from Not found out, 7 from Roman Catholic Church, 1 from Evangelical Church and 1 from Ad hoc movements.
