= Oľka =

- Municipality
- Flag

- Location of Oľka in the Prešov Region Location of Oľka in Slovakia
- Coordinates: 49.15°N 21.83°E
- Country: Slovakia
- Region: Prešov Region
- District: Medzilaborce District
- First mentioned: 1408

Area
  - Total: 31.45 km^{2} (12.14 sq mi)
- Elevation: 244 m (801 ft)

Population (2025)
  - Total: 249
- Time zone: UTC+1 (CET)
  - Summer (DST): UTC+2 (CEST)
- Postal code: 670 4
- Area code: +421 57
- Vehicle registration plate (until 2022): ML
- Website: www.olka.sk/uradna-tabula/

Oľka (Rusyn: Олька; Hungarian: Olyka) is a village and municipality in the Medzilaborce District in the Prešov Region of far north-eastern Slovakia.

== History ==
In historical records the village was first mentioned in 1408. Before the establishment of independent Czechoslovakia in 1918, Oľka was part of Zemplén County within the Kingdom of Hungary. From 1939 to 1944, it was part of the Slovak Republic. On 25 November 1944, the Red Army dislodged the Wehrmacht from Oľka and it was once again part of Czechoslovakia.

== Geography ==
The municipality lies at an altitude of 244 metres (801 ft) and covers an area of 31.45 km^{2} (12.14 sq mi) (2025).

== Population ==
Population statistic (10 years)
Year	1995	2005	2015	2025
Count	422	349	283	249
Difference		−17.29%	−18.91%	−12.01%

Population statistic
Year	2024	2025
Count	251	249
Difference		−0.79%

It has a population of 249 people (31 December 2025).

=== Ethnicity ===
Census 2021 (1+ %)
Ethnicity	Number	Fraction
Rusyn	164	63.07%
Slovak	161	61.92%
Ukrainian	4	1.53%
Not found out	4	1.53%
Total	260	

In year 2021 was 260 people by ethnicity 164 as Rusyn, 161 as Slovak, 4 as Ukrainian, 4 as Not found out, 1 as Czech and 1 as Romani.

Note on population: The difference values of population numbers in the table "Population statistic" and in the sections "Ethnicity" & "Religion" is caused by the use of various statistical methods.

=== Religion ===
Census 2021 (1+ %)
Religion	Number	Fraction
Greek Catholic Church	214	82.31%
None	16	6.15%
Roman Catholic Church	15	5.77%
Eastern Orthodox Church	11	4.23%
Not found out	3	1.15%
Total	260	

In year 2021 was 260 people by religion 214 from Greek Catholic Church, 16 from None, 15 from Roman Catholic Church, 11 from Eastern Orthodox Church, 3 from Not found out and 1 from Other.
