= Volica =

- Municipality
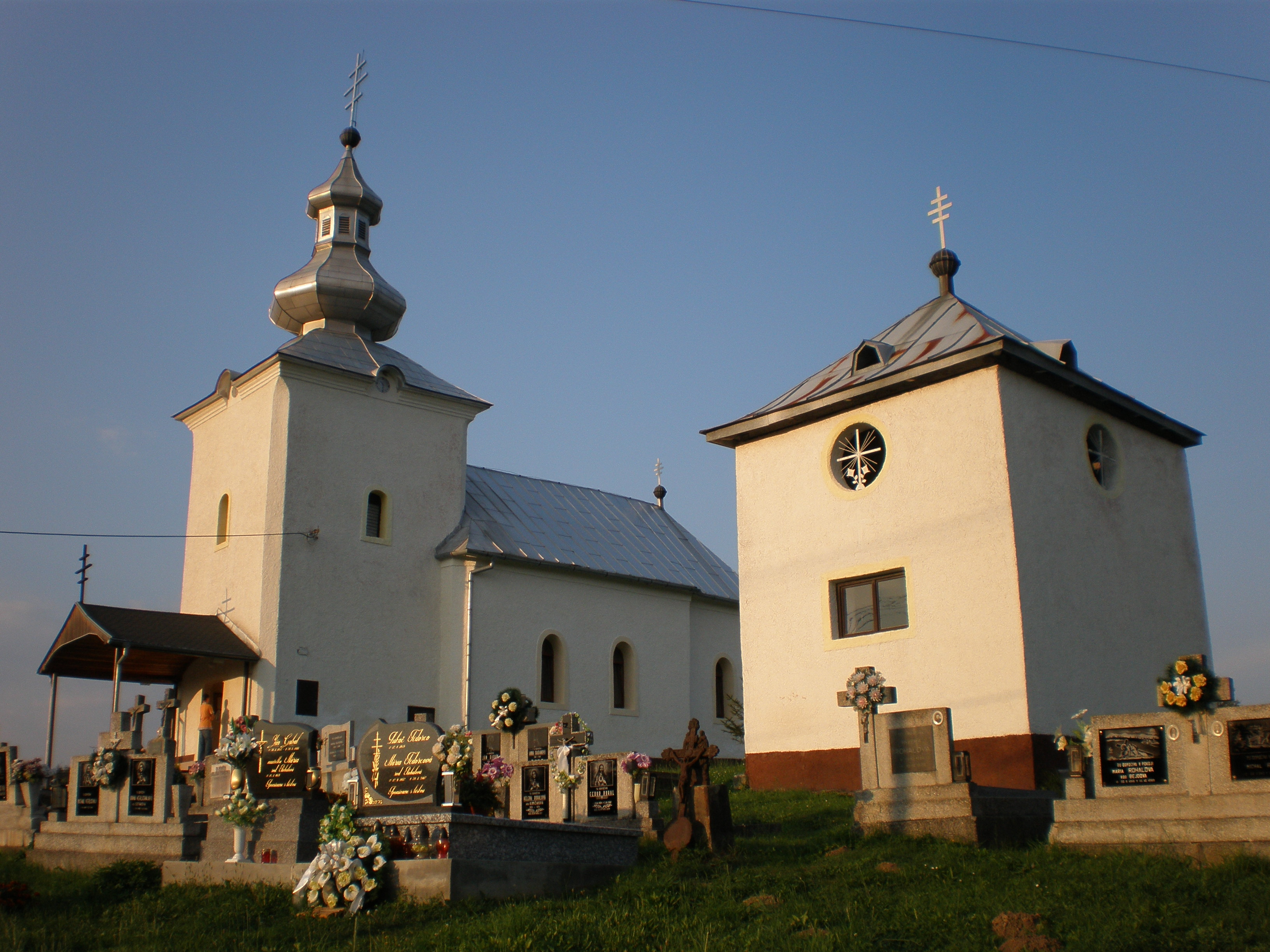
- Church and belfry in Volica

- Flag

- Location of Volica in the Prešov Region Location of Volica in Slovakia
- Coordinates: 49.15°N 21.93°E
- Country: Slovakia
- Region: Prešov Region
- District: Medzilaborce District
- First mentioned: 1405

Area
  - Total: 5.37 km^{2} (2.07 sq mi)
- Elevation: 247 m (810 ft)

Population (2025)
  - Total: 254
- Time zone: UTC+1 (CET)
  - Summer (DST): UTC+2 (CEST)
- Postal code: 670 1
- Area code: +421 57
- Vehicle registration plate (until 2022): ML
- Website: www.volica.sk

Volica (Rusyn: Воліця, Hungarian: Ökröske) is a village and municipality in the Medzilaborce District in the Prešov Region of far north-eastern Slovakia, in the Laborec Highlands.

== History ==
In historical records the village was first mentioned in 1405. The name of the village is derived from vôl, vol, "ox", and reflected in its coat of arms. Before the establishment of independent Czechoslovakia in 1918, Volica was part of Zemplén County within the Kingdom of Hungary. From 1939 to 1944, it was part of the Slovak Republic. In the autumn of 1944, the Red Army dislodged the Wehrmacht from Volica and it was once again part of Czechoslovakia.

in 1993 it became part of the Republic of Slovakia.

== Geography ==
The municipality lies at an altitude of 247 metres (810 ft) and covers an area of 5.37 km^{2} (2.07 sq mi) (2025).

== Population ==
Population statistic (10 years)
Year	1995	2005	2015	2025
Count	362	326	292	254
Difference		−9.94%	−10.42%	−13.01%

Population statistic
Year	2024	2025
Count	254	254
Difference		+0%

It has a population of 254 people (31 December 2025).

=== Ethnicity ===
Census 2021 (1+ %)
Ethnicity	Number	Fraction
Slovak	186	70.45%
Rusyn	145	54.92%
Not found out	9	3.4%
Ukrainian	3	1.13%
Romani	3	1.13%
Total	264	

In year 2021 was 264 people by ethnicity 186 as Slovak, 145 as Rusyn, 9 as Not found out, 3 as Ukrainian, 3 as Romani and 2 as Czech.

Note on population: The difference values of population numbers in the table "Population statistic" and in the sections "Ethnicity" & "Religion" is caused by the use of various statistical methods.

=== Religion ===
Census 2021 (1+ %)
Religion	Number	Fraction
Greek Catholic Church	186	70.45%
Roman Catholic Church	38	14.39%
Eastern Orthodox Church	28	10.61%
None	9	3.41%
Not found out	3	1.14%
Total	264	

In year 2021 was 264 people by religion 186 from Greek Catholic Church, 38 from Roman Catholic Church, 28 from Eastern Orthodox Church, 9 from None and 3 from Not found out.

== Gallery ==
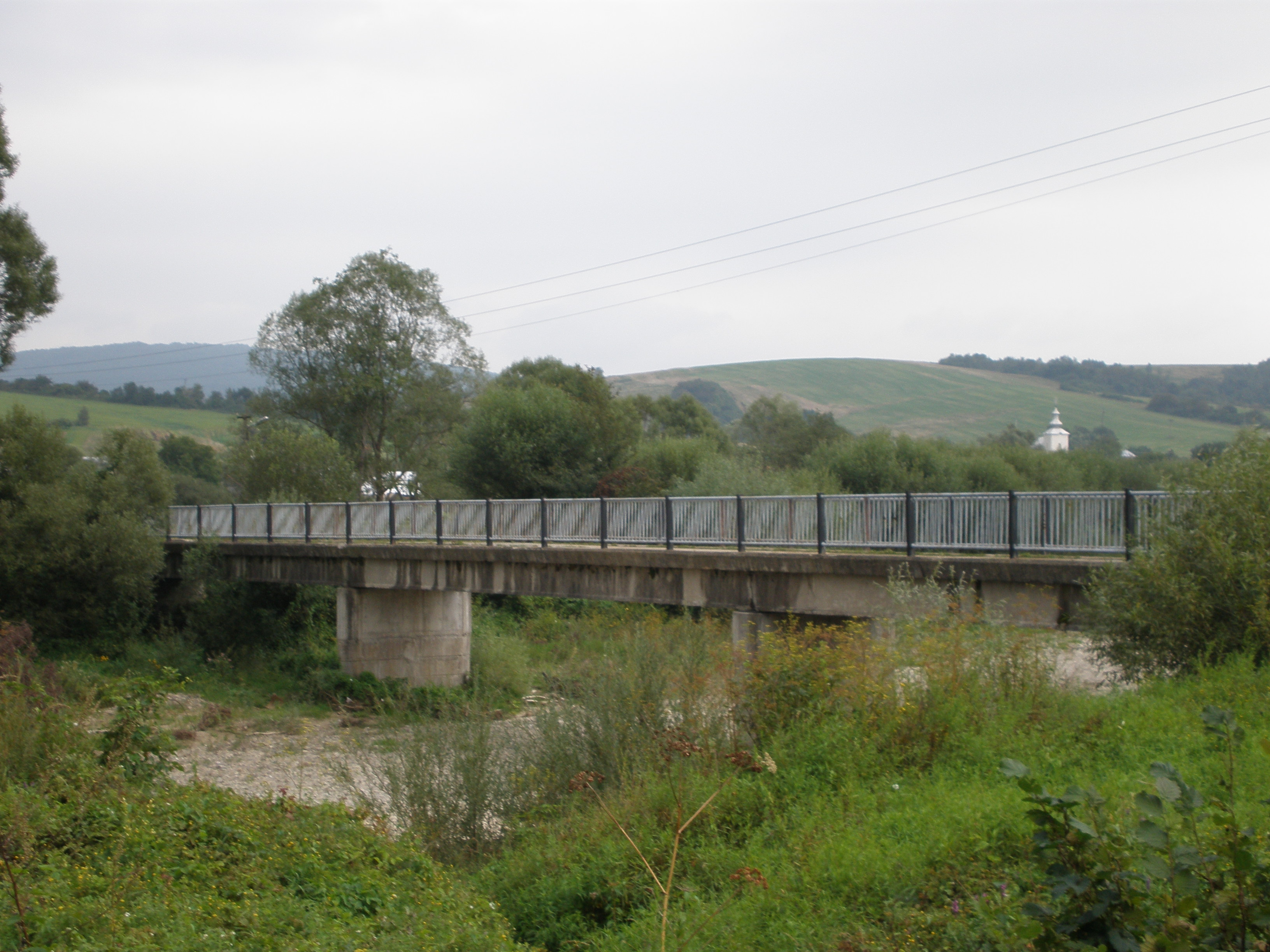
Road bridge over the Laborec river, with Volica in the background

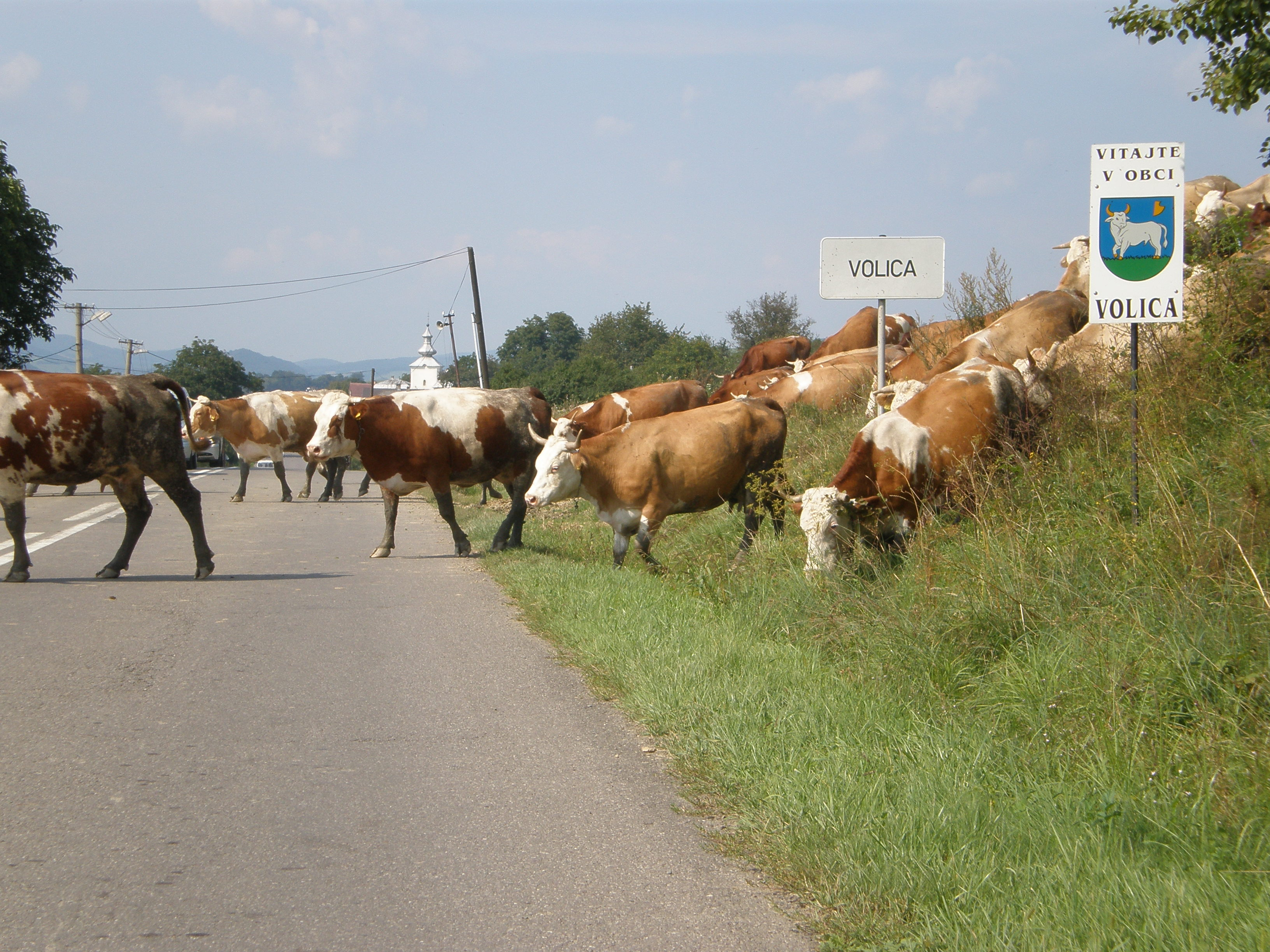
Entering Volica (cattle crossing the road, fittingly for the village's name)

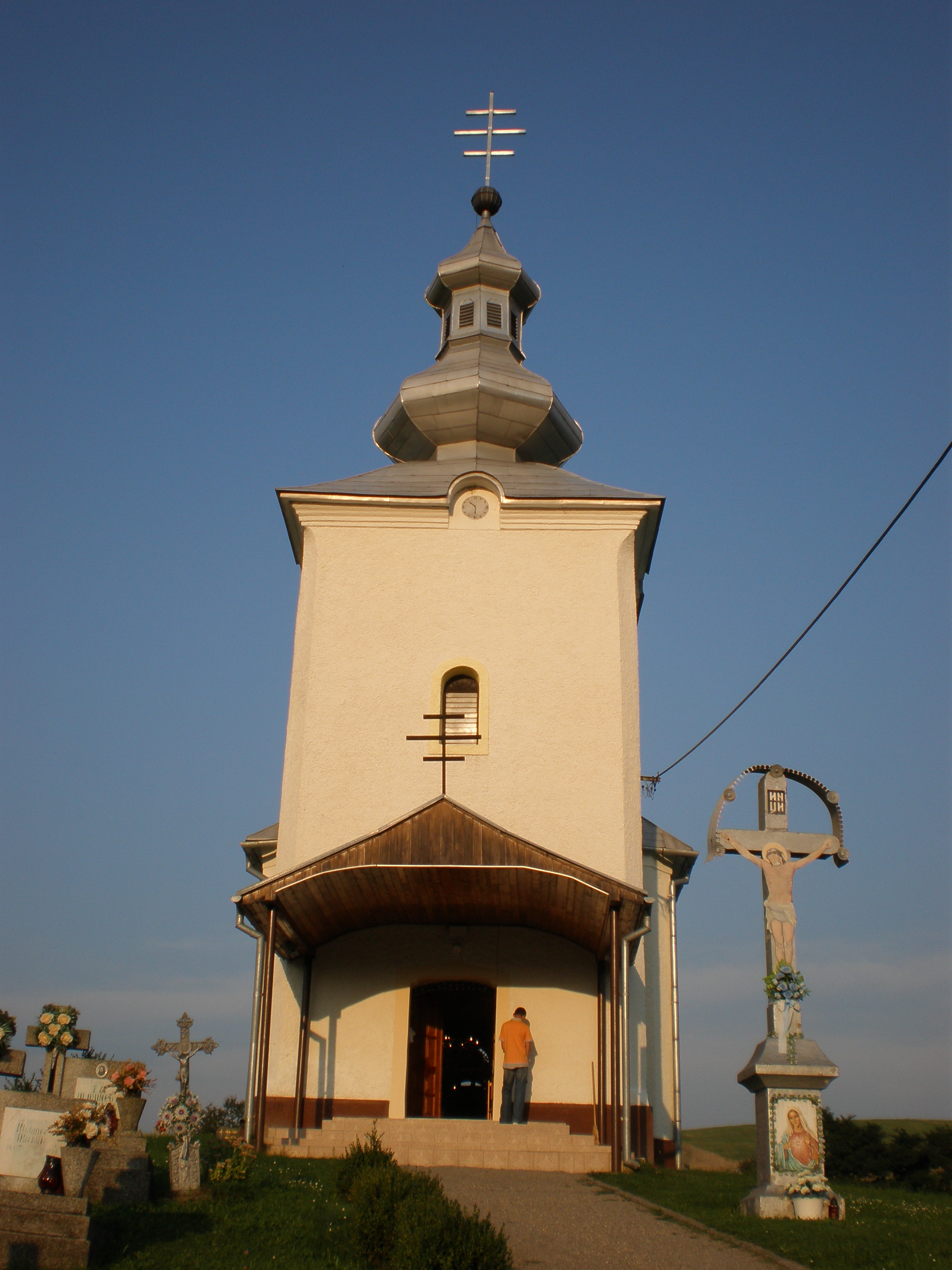
Front facade of the church in Volica

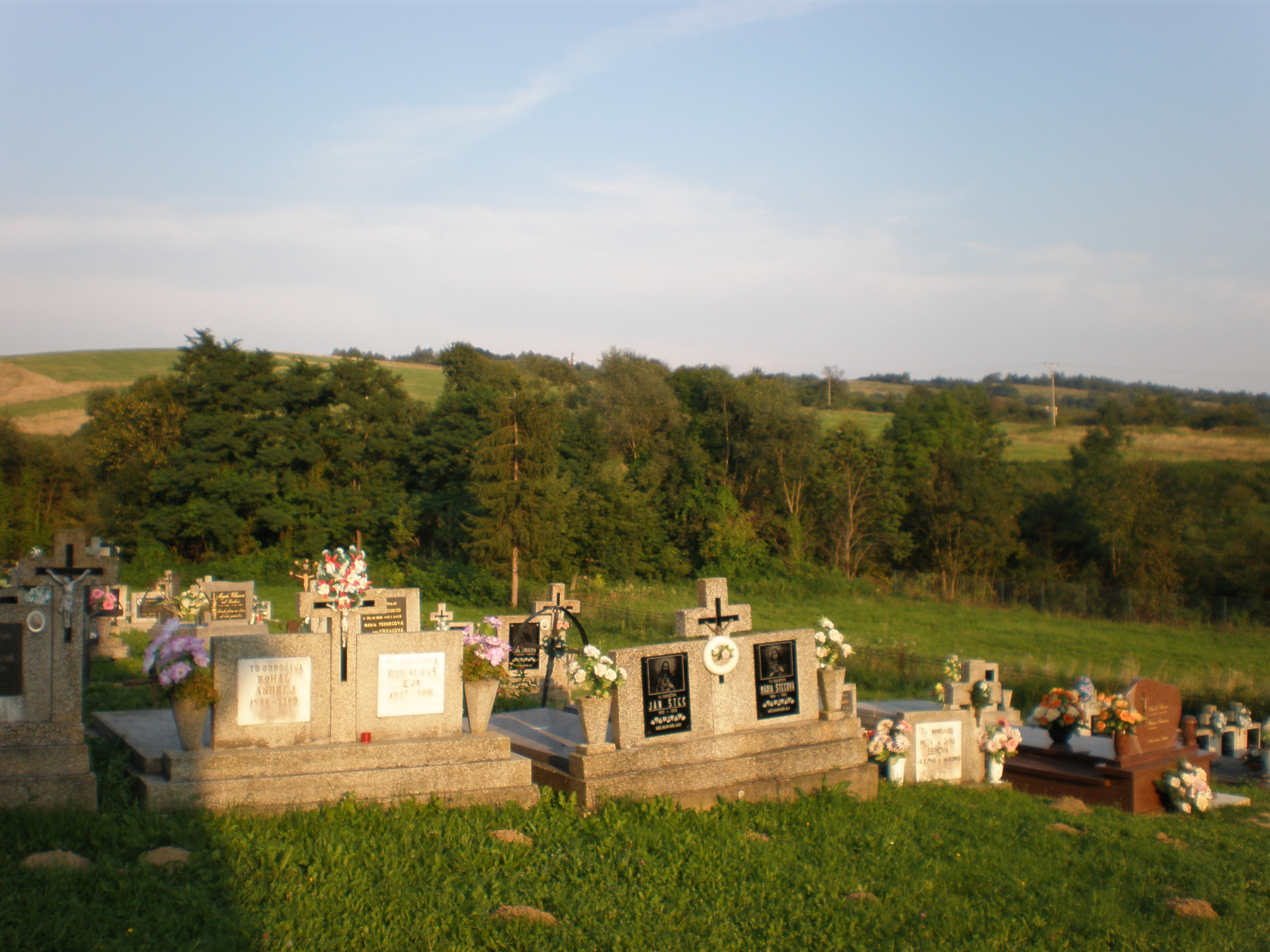
Cemetery in Volica

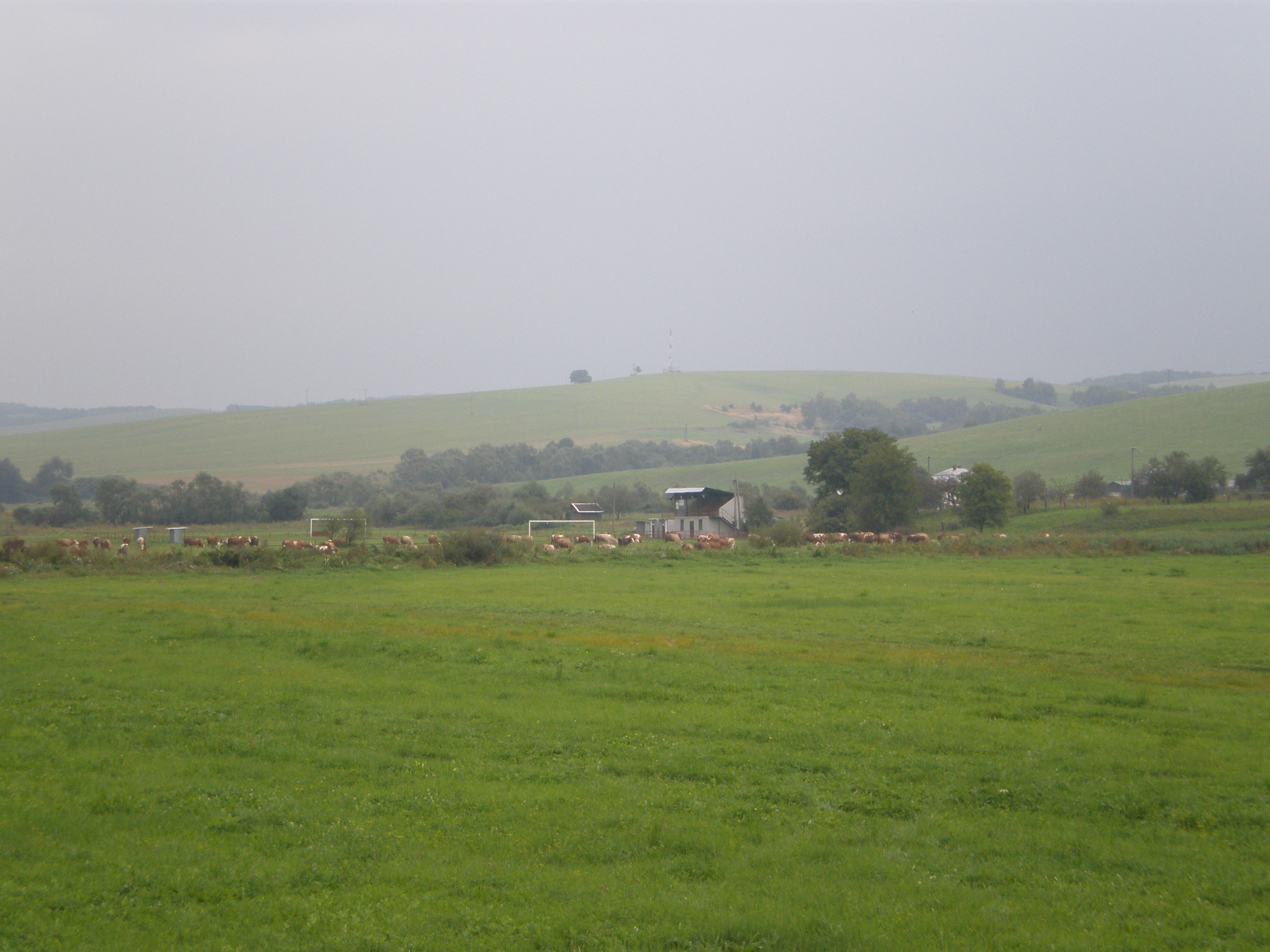
Pasture meadow (foreground) and football pitch in Volica (background)

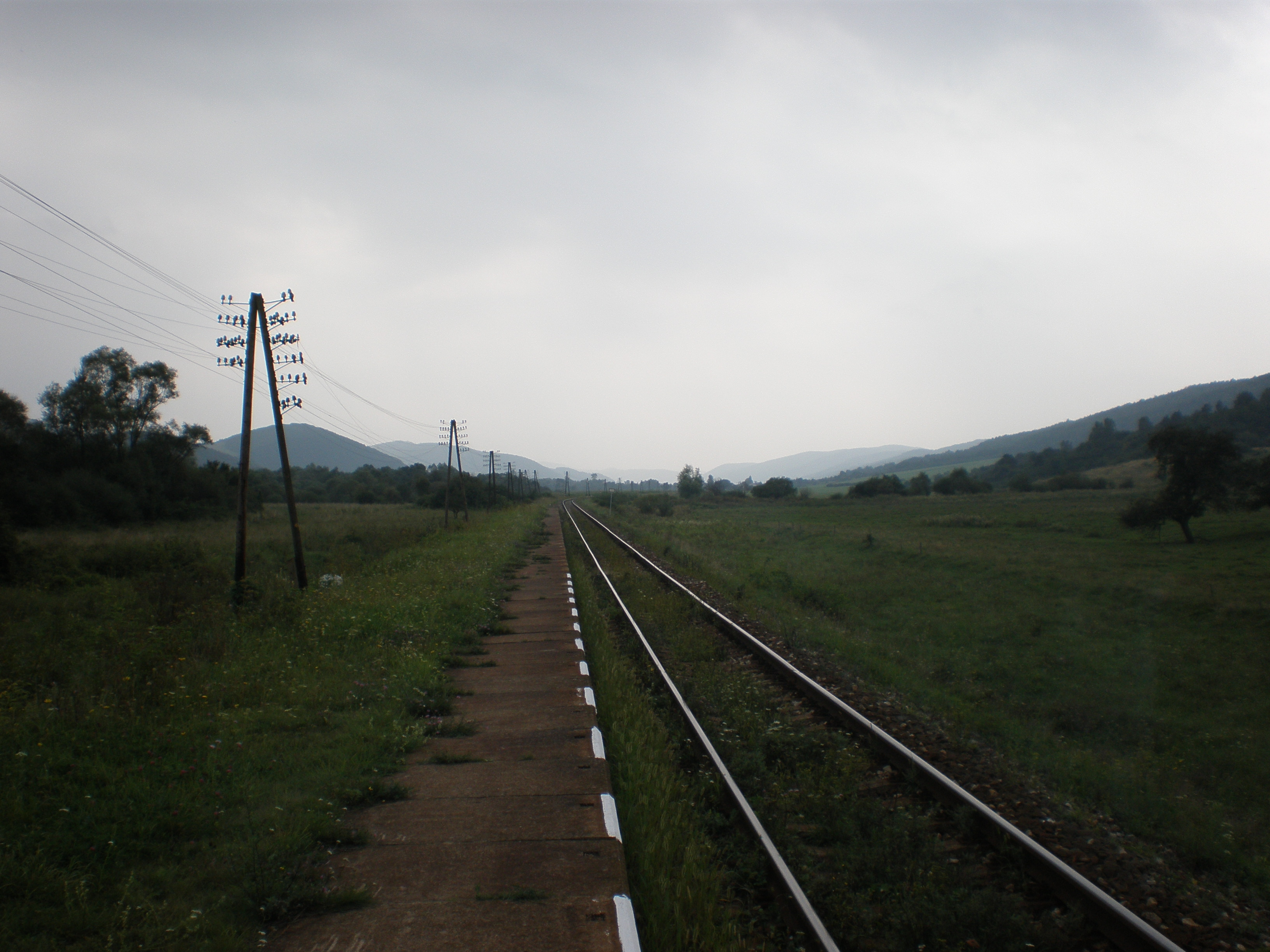
Main railway line in the Laborec river valley near volica, highlands in the background
