= Radvaň nad Laborcom =

- Municipality
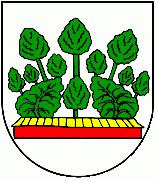
- Flag Coat of arms

- Location of Radvaň nad Laborcom in the Prešov Region Location of Radvaň nad Laborcom in Slovakia
- Coordinates: 49.13°N 21.93°E
- Country: Slovakia
- Region: Prešov Region
- District: Medzilaborce District
- First mentioned: 1440

Area
  - Total: 20.13 km^{2} (7.77 sq mi)
- Elevation: 223 m (732 ft)

Population (2025)
  - Total: 508
- Time zone: UTC+1 (CET)
  - Summer (DST): UTC+2 (CEST)
- Postal code: 670 1
- Area code: +421 57
- Vehicle registration plate (until 2022): ML
- Website: www.obecradvan.sk

Radvaň nad Laborcom (Rusyn: Радвань над Лабірцём; Hungarian: Laborcradvány) is a village and municipality in the Medzilaborce District in the Prešov Region of far north-eastern Slovakia, in the Laborec Highlands.

== History ==
In historical records the village was first mentioned in 1440. Before the establishment of independent Czechoslovakia in 1918, it was part of Zemplén County within the Kingdom of Hungary.

== Geography ==
The municipality lies at an altitude of 223 metres (732 ft) and covers an area of 20.13 km^{2} (7.77 sq mi) (2025).

== Population ==
Population statistic (10 years)
Year	1995	2005	2015	2025
Count	558	585	578	508
Difference		+4.83%	−1.19%	−12.11%

Population statistic
Year	2024	2025
Count	517	508
Difference		−1.74%

It has a population of 508 people (31 December 2025).

=== Ethnicity ===
Census 2021 (1+ %)
Ethnicity	Number	Fraction
Slovak	408	77.56%
Rusyn	214	40.68%
Romani	51	9.69%
Not found out	14	2.66%
Total	526	

In year 2021 was 526 people by ethnicity 408 as Slovak, 214 as Rusyn, 51 as Romani, 14 as Not found out, 3 as Ukrainian, 2 as Vietnamese, 1 as Czech and 1 as Other.

Note on population: The difference values of population numbers in the table "Population statistic" and in the sections "Ethnicity" & "Religion" is caused by the use of various statistical methods.

=== Religion ===
Census 2021 (1+ %)
Religion	Number	Fraction
Greek Catholic Church	401	76.24%
Roman Catholic Church	63	11.98%
None	33	6.27%
Eastern Orthodox Church	18	3.42%
Not found out	8	1.52%
Total	526	

In year 2021 was 526 people by religion 401 from Greek Catholic Church, 63 from Roman Catholic Church, 33 from None, 18 from Eastern Orthodox Church, 8 from Not found out, 1 from Calvinist Church, 1 from Evangelical Church and 1 from Ad hoc movements.
