= Ňagov =

Municipality in Slovakia

- Municipality
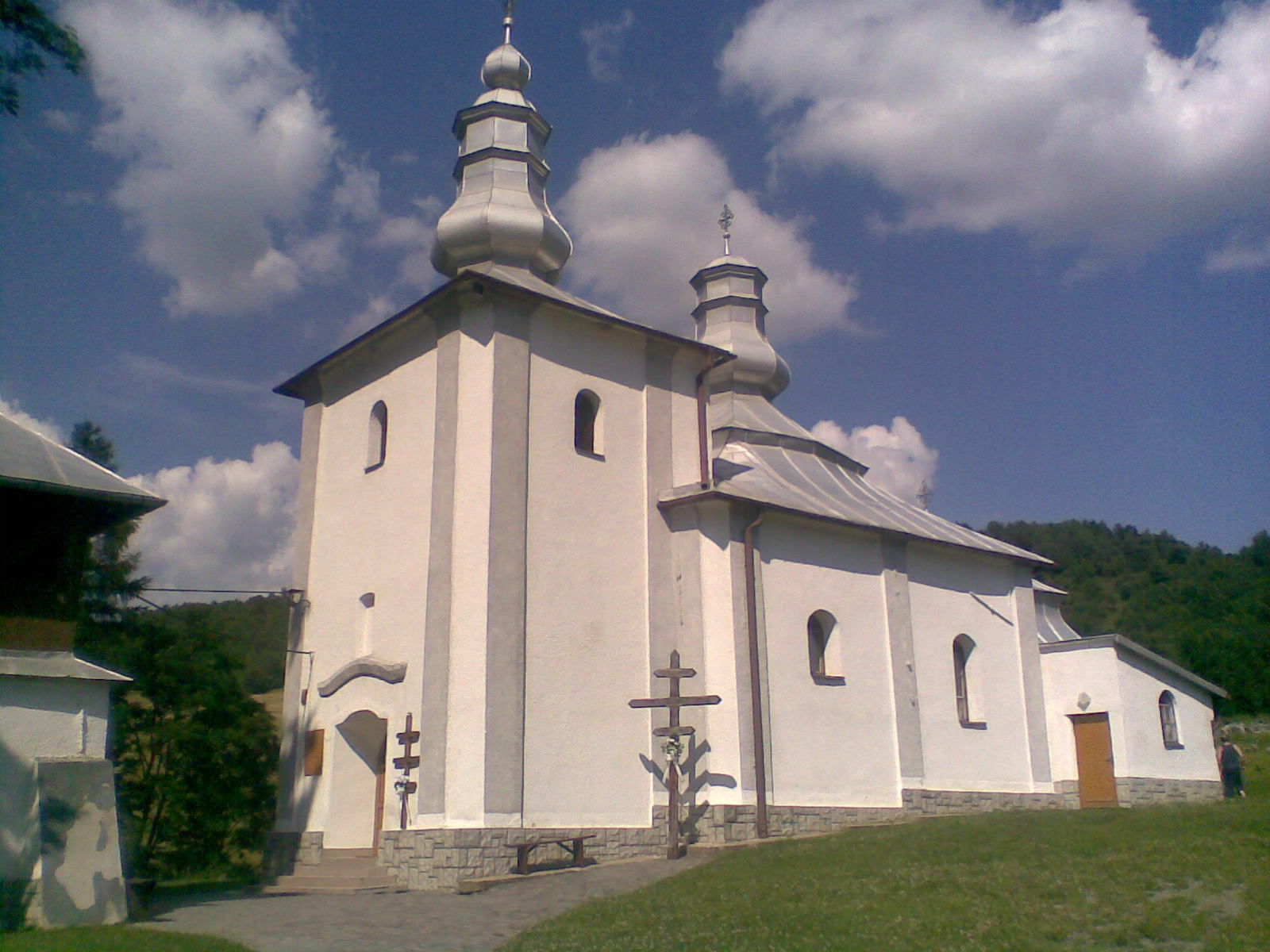

- Flag

- Location of Ňagov in the Prešov Region Location of Ňagov in Slovakia
- Coordinates: 49.25°N 21.95°E
- Country: Slovakia
- Region: Prešov Region
- District: Medzilaborce District
- First mentioned: 1557

Area
  - Total: 9.64 km^{2} (3.72 sq mi)
- Elevation: 355 m (1,165 ft)

Population (2025)
  - Total: 353
- Time zone: UTC+1 (CET)
  - Summer (DST): UTC+2 (CEST)
- Postal code: 680 1
- Area code: +421 57
- Vehicle registration plate (until 2022): ML
- Website: www.nagov.sk

Ňagov (Rusyn: Няґів; Hungarian: Nyágó) is a village and municipality in the Medzilaborce District in the Prešov Region of far north-eastern Slovakia.

== History ==
In historical records, the village is first mentioned in 1557. Before the establishment of independent Czechoslovakia in 1918, Ňagov was part of Zemplén County within the Kingdom of Hungary. From 1939 to 1944, it was part of the Slovak Republic. On 29 October 1944, the Red Army dislodged the Wehrmacht from Ňagov and it was once again part of Czechoslovakia.

== Geography ==
The municipality lies at an altitude of 355 metres (1,165 ft) and covers an area of 9.64 km^{2} (3.72 sq mi) (2025).

== Population ==
Population statistic (10 years)
Year	1995	2005	2015	2025
Count	472	403	427	353
Difference		−14.61%	+5.95%	−17.33%

Population statistic
Year	2024	2025
Count	365	353
Difference		−3.28%

It has a population of 353 people (31 December 2025).

=== Ethnicity ===
Census 2021 (1+ %)
Ethnicity	Number	Fraction
Slovak	253	64.87%
Rusyn	243	62.3%
Not found out	10	2.56%
Ukrainian	5	1.28%
Romani	4	1.02%
Total	390	

In year 2021 was 390 people by ethnicity 253 as Slovak, 243 as Rusyn, 10 as Not found out, 5 as Ukrainian, 4 as Romani, 1 as Czech and 1 as Other.

Note on population: The difference values of population numbers in the table "Population statistic" and in the sections "Ethnicity" & "Religion" is caused by the use of various statistical methods.

=== Religion ===
Census 2021 (1+ %)
Religion	Number	Fraction
Greek Catholic Church	298	76.41%
Eastern Orthodox Church	25	6.41%
Roman Catholic Church	17	4.36%
None	17	4.36%
Evangelical Church	16	4.1%
Jehovah's Witnesses	11	2.82%
Not found out	6	1.54%
Total	390	

In year 2021 was 390 people by religion 298 from Greek Catholic Church, 25 from Eastern Orthodox Church, 17 from Roman Catholic Church, 17 from None, 16 from Evangelical Church, 11 from Jehovah's Witnesses and 6 from Not found out.
