= Čabalovce =

- Municipality
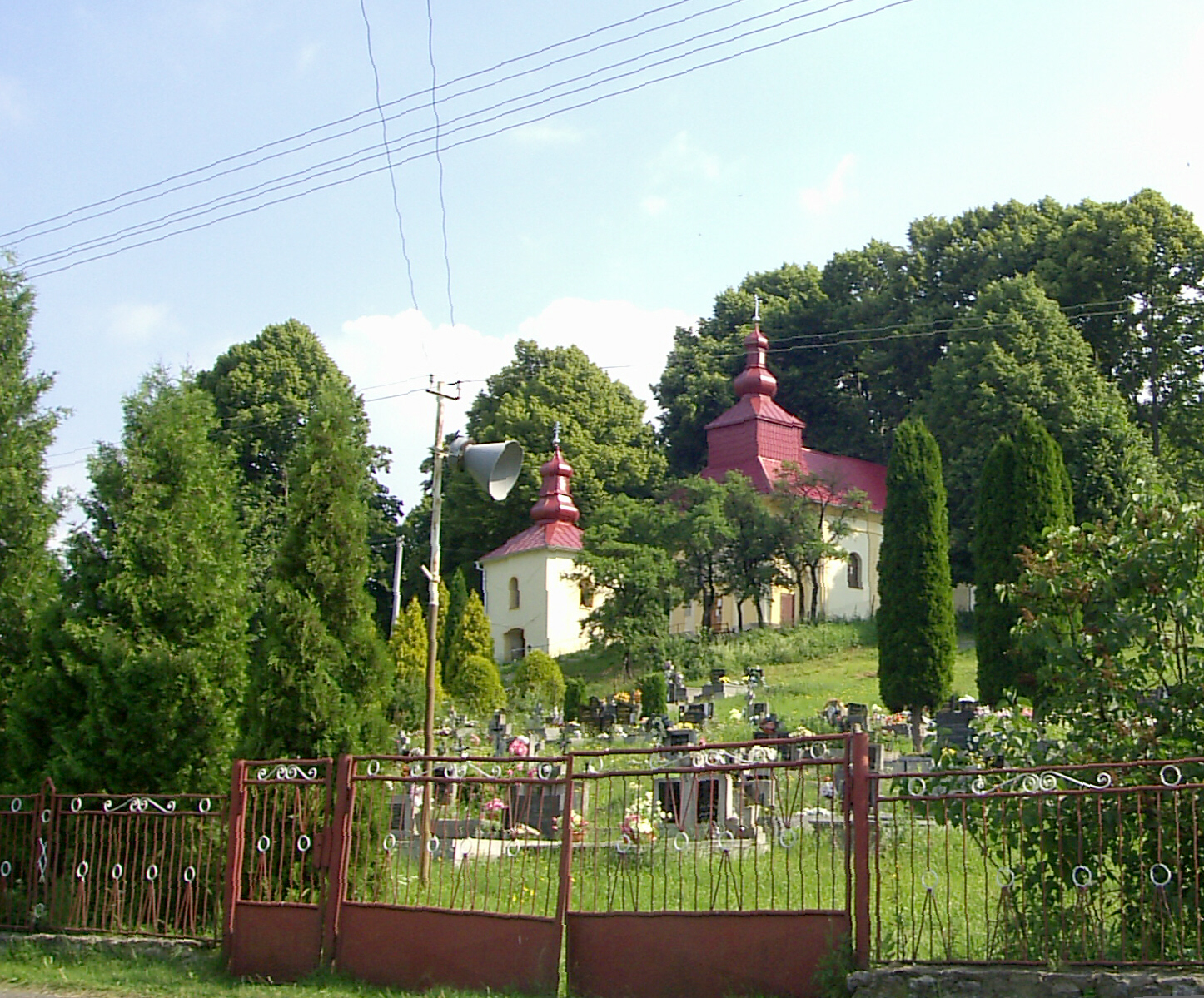
- Greek Catholic church

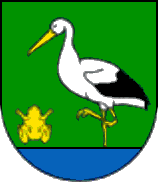
- Flag Coat of arms

- Location of Čabalovce in the Prešov Region Location of Čabalovce in Slovakia
- Coordinates: 49.23°N 21.97°E
- Country: Slovakia
- Region: Prešov Region
- District: Medzilaborce District
- First mentioned: 1494

Area
  - Total: 21.40 km^{2} (8.26 sq mi)
- Elevation: 383 m (1,257 ft)

Population (2025)
  - Total: 320
- Time zone: UTC+1 (CET)
  - Summer (DST): UTC+2 (CEST)
- Postal code: 671 7
- Area code: +421 57
- Vehicle registration plate (until 2022): ML
- Website: {{URL|example.com|optional display text}}

Čabalovce (Rusyn: Чабалівцї; Ukrainian: Чабалівці; Hungarian: Csabaháza) is a village and municipality in the Medzilaborce District in the Prešov Region of far north-eastern Slovakia.

== History ==
In historical records the village was first mentioned in 1494. Before the establishment of independent Czechoslovakia in 1918, it was part of Zemplén County within the Kingdom of Hungary.

== Geography ==
The municipality lies at an altitude of 383 metres (1,257 ft) and covers an area of 21.40 km^{2} (8.26 sq mi) (2025).

== Population ==
Population statistic (10 years)
Year	1995	2005	2015	2025
Count	300	357	368	320
Difference		+19%	+3.08%	−13.04%

Population statistic
Year	2024	2025
Count	328	320
Difference		−2.43%

It has a population of 320 people (31 December 2025).

=== Ethnicity ===
Census 2021 (1+ %)
Ethnicity	Number	Fraction
Slovak	232	72.04%
Rusyn	136	42.23%
Not found out	11	3.41%
Czech	7	2.17%
Ukrainian	4	1.24%
Total	322	

In year 2021 was 322 people by ethnicity 232 as Slovak, 136 as Rusyn, 11 as Not found out, 7 as Czech, 4 as Ukrainian and 2 as Jewish.

Note on population: The difference values of population numbers in the table "Population statistic" and in the sections "Ethnicity" & "Religion" is caused by the use of various statistical methods.

=== Religion ===
Census 2021 (1+ %)
Religion	Number	Fraction
Greek Catholic Church	215	66.77%
Eastern Orthodox Church	48	14.91%
None	40	12.42%
Not found out	9	2.8%
Roman Catholic Church	7	2.17%
Total	322	

In year 2021 was 322 people by religion 215 from Greek Catholic Church, 48 from Eastern Orthodox Church, 40 from None, 9 from Not found out, 7 from Roman Catholic Church, 2 from Evangelical Church and 1 from Jehovah's Witnesses.

== Genealogical resources ==
The records for genealogical research are available at the state archive "Statny Archiv in Kosice, Presov, Slovakia"

- Roman Catholic church records (births/marriages/deaths): 1786-1898 (parish B)

== See also ==
- List of municipalities and towns in Slovakia
