= Výrava (Medzilaborce District) =

- Municipality
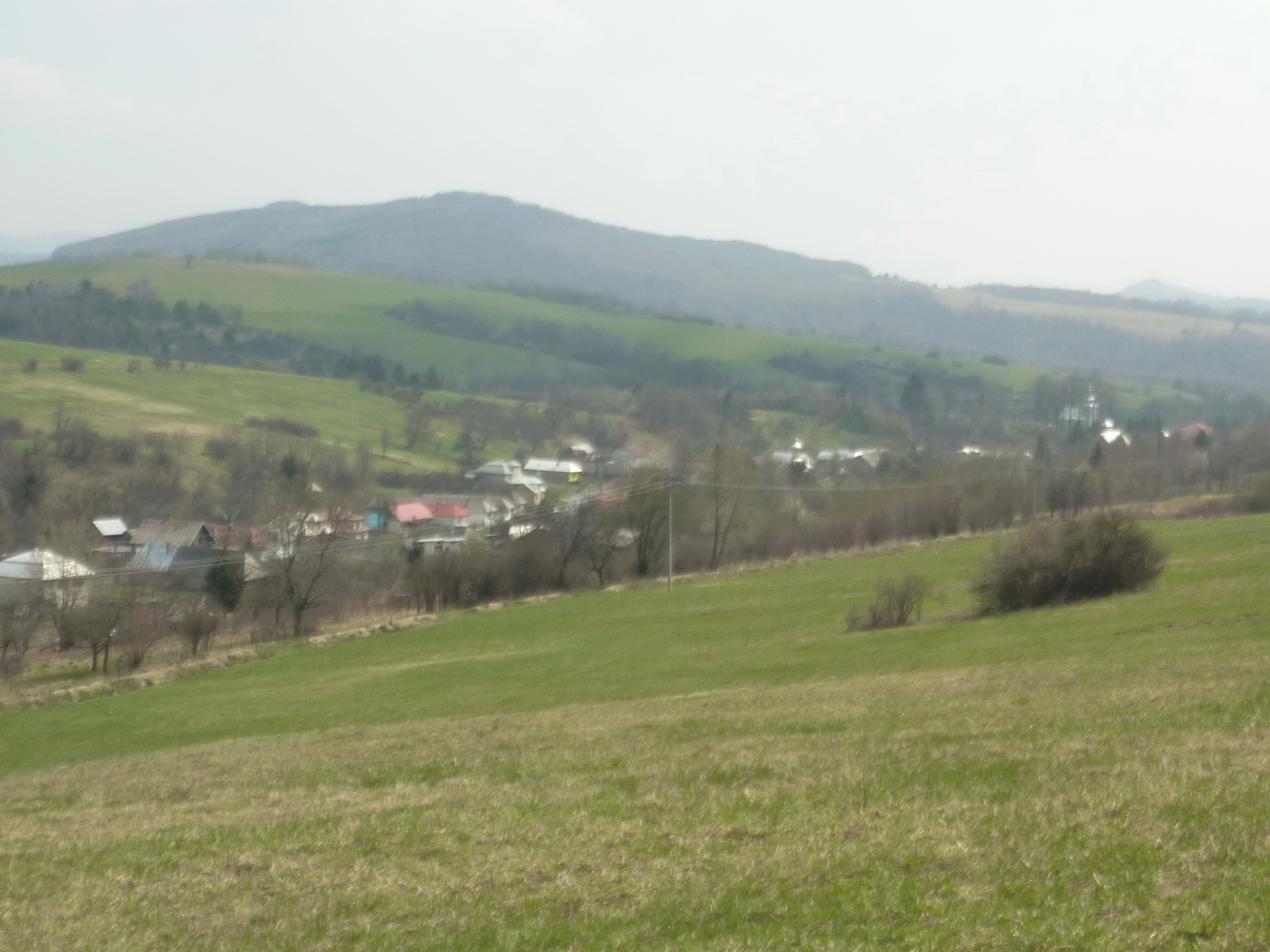

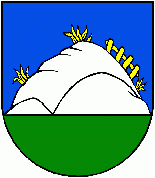
- Flag Coat of arms

- Location of Výrava in the Prešov Region Location of Výrava in Slovakia
- Coordinates: 49°12′N 22°00′E
- Country: Slovakia
- Region: Prešov Region
- District: Medzilaborce District
- First mentioned: 1557

Area
  - Total: 20.24 km^{2} (7.81 sq mi)
- Elevation: 357 m (1,171 ft)

Population (2025)
  - Total: 188
- Time zone: UTC+1 (CET)
  - Summer (DST): UTC+2 (CEST)
- Postal code: 671 6
- Area code: +421 57
- Vehicle registration plate (until 2022): ML

Výrava (Rusyn: Вырава, Hungarian: Virava) is a village and municipality in the Medzilaborce District in the Prešov Region of far north-eastern Slovakia.

== History ==
In historical records the village was first mentioned in 1557. Before the establishment of independent Czechoslovakia in 1918, it was part of Zemplén County within the Kingdom of Hungary.

== Geography ==
The municipality lies at an altitude of 357 metres (1,171 ft) and covers an area of 20.24 km^{2} (7.81 sq mi) (2025).

== Population ==
Population statistic (10 years)
Year	1995	2005	2015	2025
Count	152	153	185	188
Difference		+0.65%	+20.91%	+1.62%

Population statistic
Year	2024	2025
Count	186	188
Difference		+1.07%

It has a population of 188 people (31 December 2025).

=== Ethnicity ===
Census 2021 (1+ %)
Ethnicity	Number	Fraction
Slovak	141	74.6%
Rusyn	77	40.74%
Romani	16	8.46%
Not found out	6	3.17%
Czech	2	1.05%
Ukrainian	2	1.05%
Total	189	

In year 2021 was 189 people by ethnicity 141 as Slovak, 77 as Rusyn, 16 as Romani, 6 as Not found out, 2 as Czech, 2 as Ukrainian, 1 as Russian, 1 as German and 1 as Hungarian.

Note on population: The difference values of population numbers in the table "Population statistic" and in the sections "Ethnicity" & "Religion" is caused by the use of various statistical methods.

=== Religion ===
Census 2021 (1+ %)
Religion	Number	Fraction
Eastern Orthodox Church	62	32.8%
Greek Catholic Church	58	30.69%
None	28	14.81%
Roman Catholic Church	25	13.23%
Jehovah's Witnesses	10	5.29%
Not found out	4	2.12%
Calvinist Church	2	1.06%
Total	189	

In year 2021 was 189 people by religion 62 from Eastern Orthodox Church, 58 from Greek Catholic Church, 28 from None, 25 from Roman Catholic Church, 10 from Jehovah's Witnesses, 4 from Not found out and 2 from Calvinist Church.

== Gallery ==
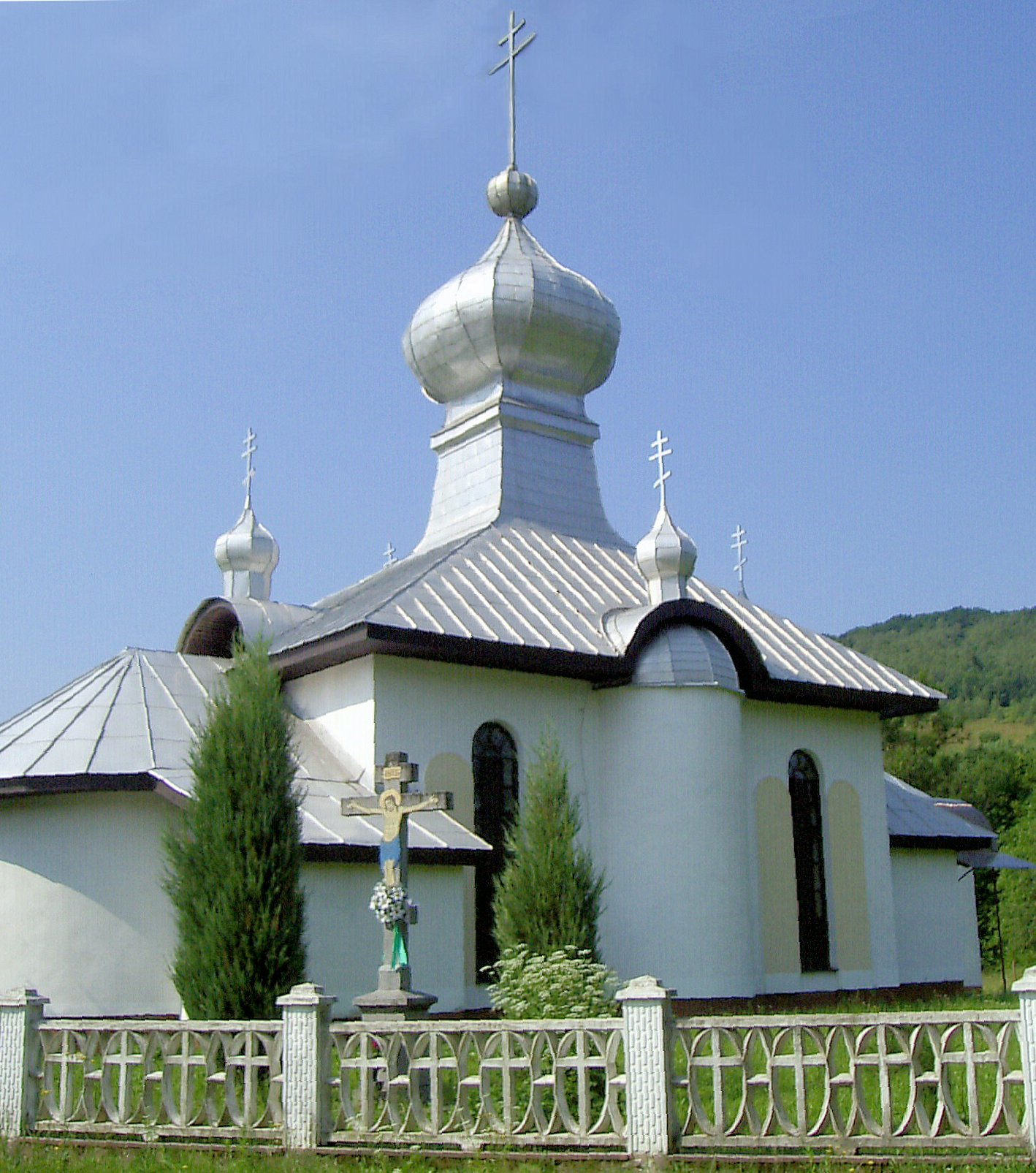

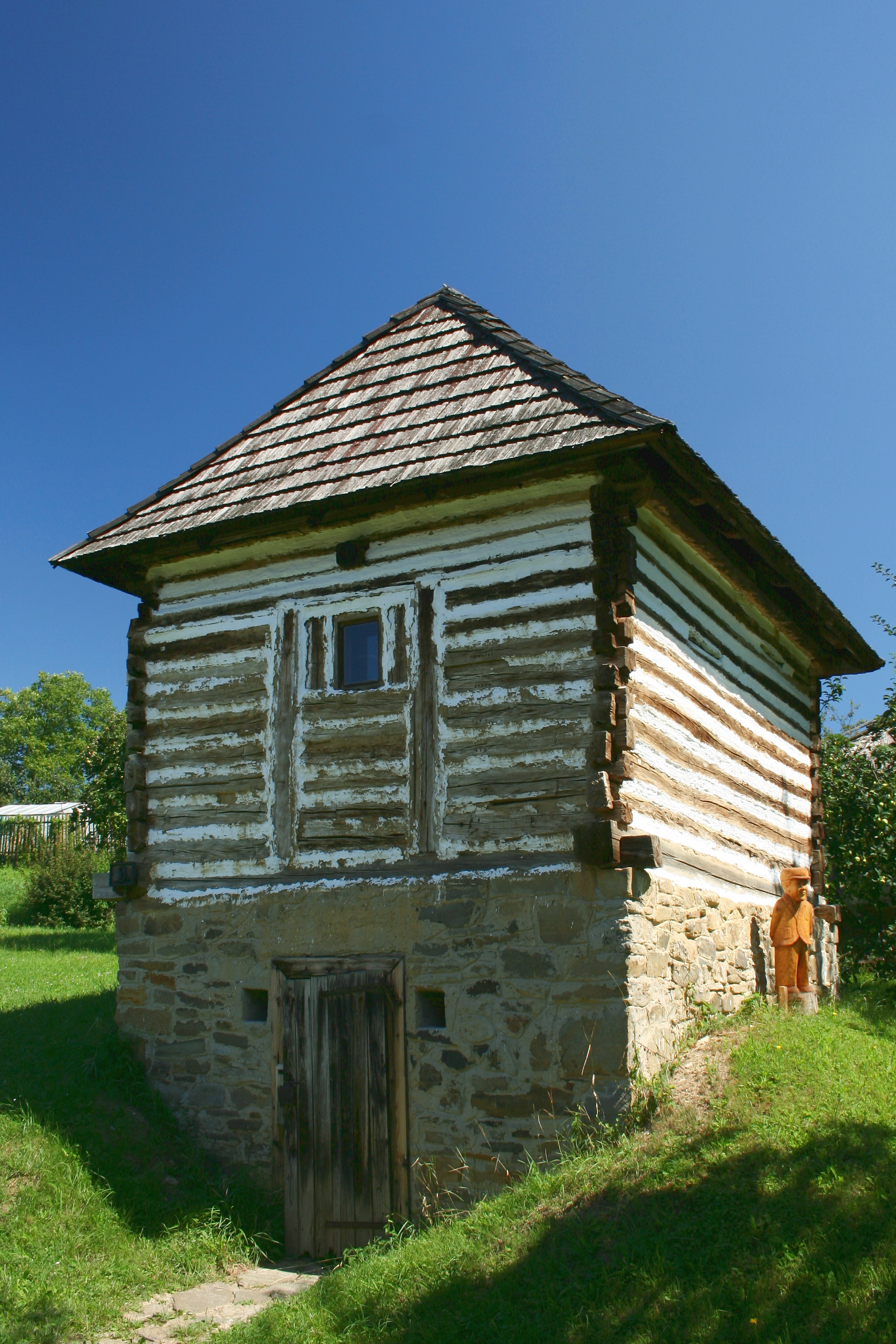
