= Medzilaborce District =

Coordinates: 49°16′16″N 21°54′13″E

- District
- Country: Slovakia
- Region (kraj): Prešov Region
- Seat: Medzilaborce

Area
  - Total: 427.26 km^{2} (164.97 sq mi)

Population (2025)
  - Total: 10,518
- Time zone: UTC+1 (CET)
  - Summer (DST): UTC+2 (CEST)
- Telephone prefix: 057
- Vehicle registration plate (until 2022): ML
- Municipalities: 23

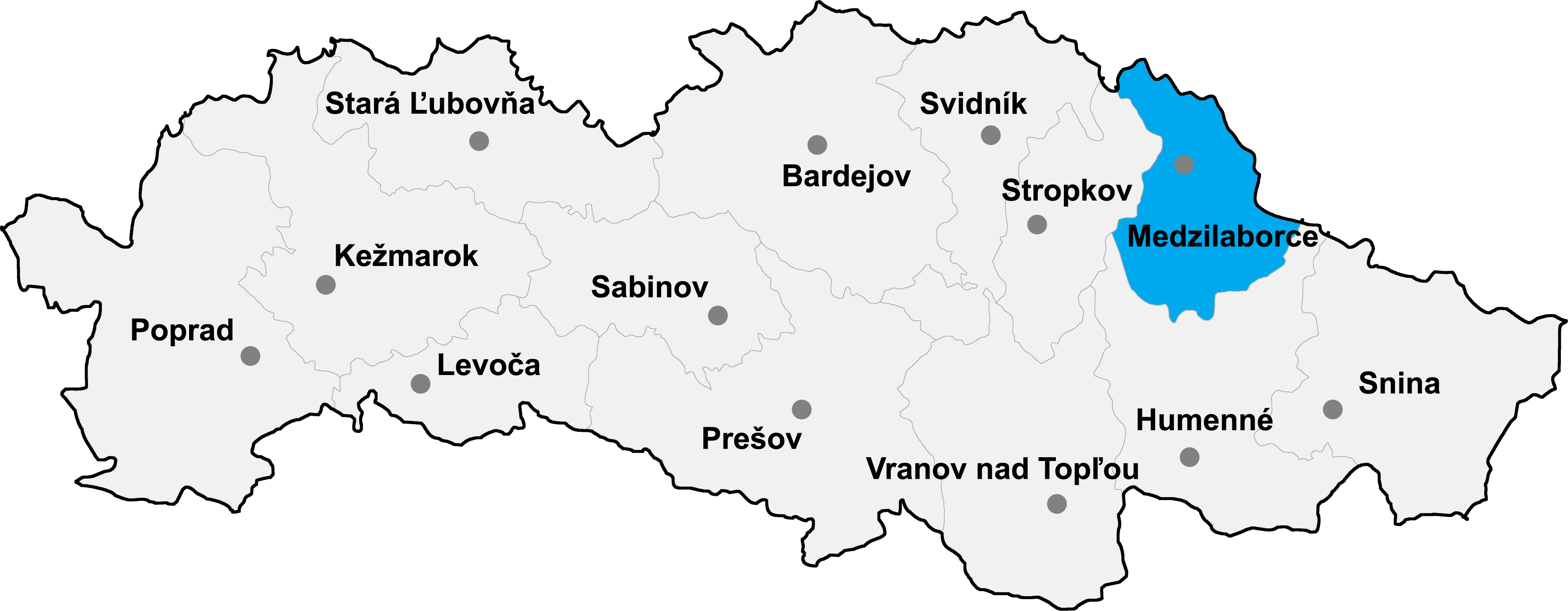

Medzilaborce District (okres Medzilaborce) is a district in the Prešov Region of northeastern Slovakia. Until 1918, the district was part of the county of Kingdom of Hungary of Zemplín. It has a population of roughly 11,000 and as such is the least populated of Slovakia's 79 districts.

== Population ==
Historical population
Year	Pop.	±%
1970	15,840	—
1980	14,586	−7.9%
1991	13,122	−10.0%
2001	12,668	−3.5%
2011	12,450	−1.7%
2021	11,056	−11.2%
Source: Censuses

Population statistic (10 years)
Year	1995	2005	2015	2025
Count	12,966	12,324	12,133	10,518
Difference		−4.95%	−1.54%	−13.31%

Population statistic
Year	2024	2025
Count	10,605	10,518
Difference		−0.82%

It has a population of 10,518 people (31 December 2025).

=== Ethnicity ===
Census 2021 (1+ %)
Ethnicity	Number	Fraction
Slovak	7036	49.06%
Rusyn	5617	39.17%
Not found out	656	4.57%
Romani	598	4.17%
Ukrainian	264	1.84%
Total	14,340	

In year 2021 was 14,340 people by ethnicity 7036 as Slovak, 5617 as Rusyn, 656 as Not found out, 598 as Romani, 264 as Ukrainian, 78 as Czech, 21 as Hungarian, 17 as Russian, 14 as Other, 8 as Vietnamese, 8 as Polish, 5 as Romanian, 4 as English, 3 as Bulgarian, 2 as Jewish, 2 as Italian, 2 as German, 2 as Greek, 1 as Chinese, 1 as Austrian and 1 as Moravian.

Note on population: The difference values of population numbers in the table "Population statistic" and in the sections "Ethnicity" & "Religion" is caused by the use of various statistical methods.

=== Religion ===
Census 2021 (1+ %)
Religion	Number	Fraction
Greek Catholic Church	5498	49.73%
Eastern Orthodox Church	2942	26.61%
Roman Catholic Church	958	8.66%
None	819	7.41%
Not found out	591	5.35%
Jehovah's Witnesses	124	1.12%
Total	11,056	

In year 2021 was 11,056 people by religion 5498 from Greek Catholic Church, 2942 from Eastern Orthodox Church, 958 from Roman Catholic Church, 819 from None, 591 from Not found out, 124 from Jehovah's Witnesses, 61 from Evangelical Church, 13 from Ad hoc movements, 11 from Other, 9 from Other and not ascertained christian church, 8 from Calvinist Church, 6 from Church of the Brethren, 5 from Seventh-day Adventist Church, 5 from Buddhism, 2 from Christian Congregations in Slovakia, 1 from Old Catholic Church, 1 from United Methodist Church, 1 from Baptists Church and 1 from Apostolic Church.

== Economy and infrastructure ==
Mainly glass and machinery industry have the largest tradition in small town Medzilaborce.

From 1970s it had been a branch of Jablonecke sklarne which had employ approximately 600 people in the glass industry. Since 1999 Glass LPS has been a follower of 45 years old tradition in glass industry in Medzilaborce and still manufacture crystal chandeliers, grind crystal trimmings and export them around the world.

It was Transporta, later Vihorlat which had 1200 employees in machinery industry in small town Medzilaborce. Privatization and global financial crises had destroyed the structure of the whole factory. Nowadays companies Kovostroj and Labstroj continue in machinery industry.

=== Major employers ===
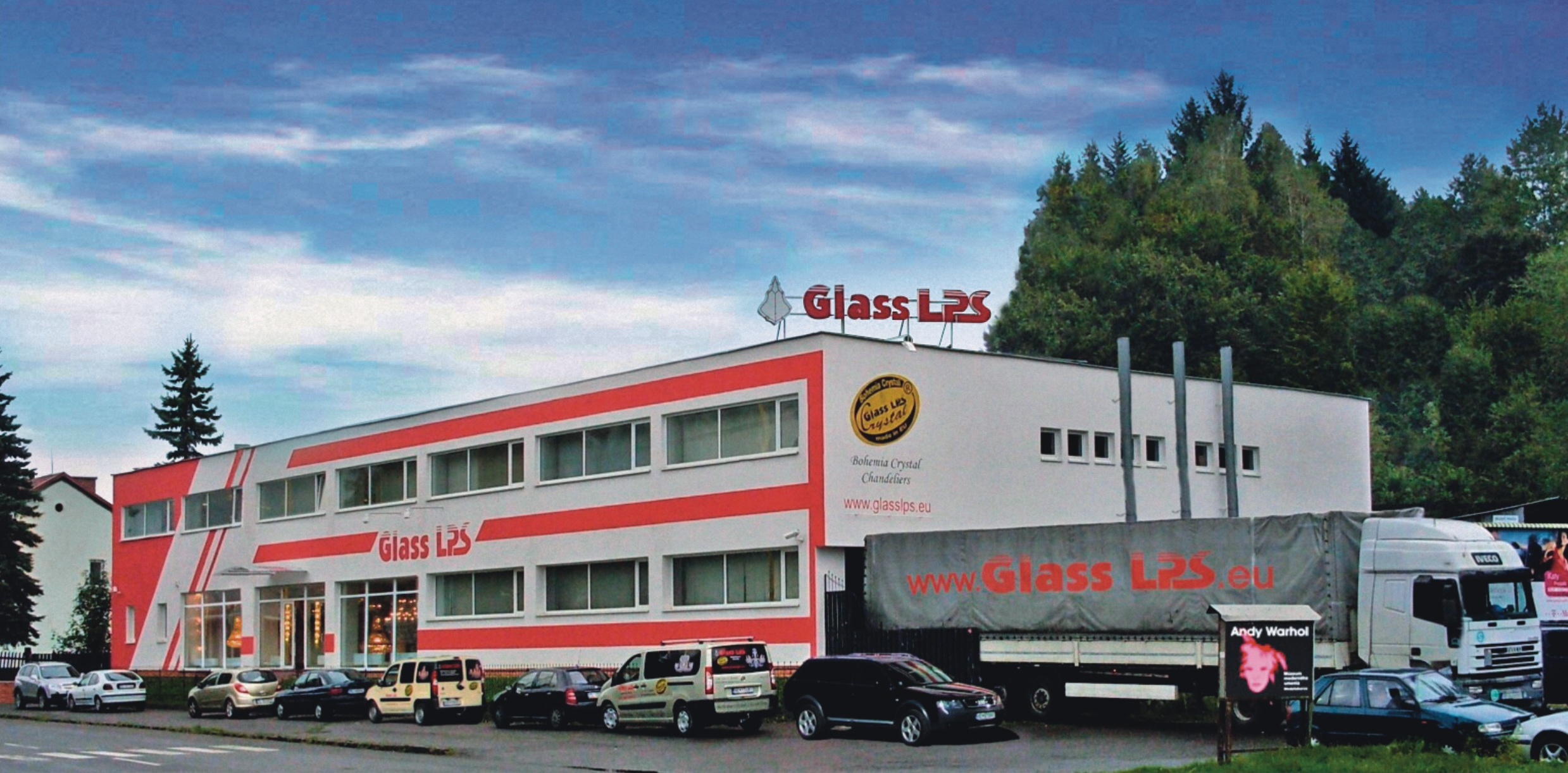
Glass LPS - producer of crystal chandeliers.

- Glass LPS Ltd.
- Kovostroj Inc.
- Labstroj Ltd.

== Municipalities ==
Municipality	Area [km^{2}]	Population
Brestov nad Laborcom	6.04	145
Čabalovce	21.40	320
Čabiny	38.84	286
Čertižné	23.72	301
Habura	27.82	442
Kalinov	13.78	238
Krásny Brod	15.11	439
Medzilaborce	47.48	5,669
Ňagov	9.64	353
Oľka	31.45	249
Oľšinkov	7.65	24
Palota	24.12	174
Radvaň nad Laborcom	20.13	508
Repejov	18.31	95
Rokytovce	7.37	155
Roškovce	12.57	133
Sukov	8.18	146
Svetlice	31.64	77
Valentovce	2.20	39
Volica	5.37	254
Výrava	20.24	188
Zbojné	18.15	163
Zbudská Belá	15.97	120

Population and area values are current for year 2025.

== Sources ==
- Lacika, Ján (2005). Slovaquie en bref. Priroda. ISBN 80-07-01377-6.
