= Brestov nad Laborcom =

- Municipality
- Location of Brestov nad Laborcom in the Prešov Region Location of Brestov nad Laborcom in Slovakia
- Coordinates: 49.12°N 21.95°E
- Country: Slovakia
- Region: Prešov Region
- District: Medzilaborce District
- First mentioned: 1434

Area
  - Total: 6.04 km^{2} (2.33 sq mi)
- Elevation: 215 m (705 ft)

Population (2025)
  - Total: 145
- Time zone: UTC+1 (CET)
  - Summer (DST): UTC+2 (CEST)
- Postal code: 670 1
- Area code: +421 57
- Vehicle registration plate (until 2022): ML

Brestov nad Laborcom (Rusyn: Берестів над Лабірцём; Ukrainian: Берестів-над-Лабірцем, romanized: Berestiv-nad-Labirtsem; Hungarian: Laborcbér) is a village and municipality in the Medzilaborce District in the Prešov Region of far north-eastern Slovakia.

== History ==
In historical records the village was first mentioned in 1434. The name of the village is derived from brest, the term for "elm tree". The nad Laborcom epithet in the full modern name of the village means "upon-Laborec". Before the establishment of independent Czechoslovakia in 1918, it was part of Zemplén County within the Kingdom of Hungary.

== Geography ==
The municipality lies at an altitude of 215 metres (705 ft) and covers an area of 6.04 km^{2} (2.33 sq mi) (2025).

== Population ==
Population statistic (10 years)
Year	1995	2005	2015	2025
Count	89	65	103	145
Difference		−26.96%	+58.46%	+40.77%

Population statistic
Year	2024	2025
Count	130	145
Difference		+11.53%

It has a population of 145 people (31 December 2025).

=== Ethnicity ===
Census 2021 (1+ %)
Ethnicity	Number	Fraction
Slovak	65	61.32%
Romani	37	34.9%
Rusyn	22	20.75%
Not found out	11	10.37%
Total	106	

In year 2021 was 106 people by ethnicity 65 as Slovak, 37 as Romani, 22 as Rusyn, 11 as Not found out, 1 as Czech and 1 as Ukrainian.

Note on population: The difference values of population numbers in the table "Population statistic" and in the sections "Ethnicity" & "Religion" is caused by the use of various statistical methods.

=== Religion ===
Census 2021 (1+ %)
Religion	Number	Fraction
Greek Catholic Church	85	80.19%
None	9	8.49%
Not found out	8	7.55%
Roman Catholic Church	4	3.77%
Total	106	

In year 2021 was 106 people by religion 85 from Greek Catholic Church, 9 from None, 8 from Not found out and 4 from Roman Catholic Church.

== Genealogical resources ==
The records for genealogical research are available at the state archive "Statny Archiv in Presov, Slovakia"

- Roman Catholic church records (births/marriages/deaths): 1786-1898 (parish B)
- Greek Catholic church records (births/marriages/deaths): 1790-1911 (parish B)

== See also ==
- List of municipalities and towns in Slovakia
