= Brestov, Prešov District =

Brestov
- Municipality
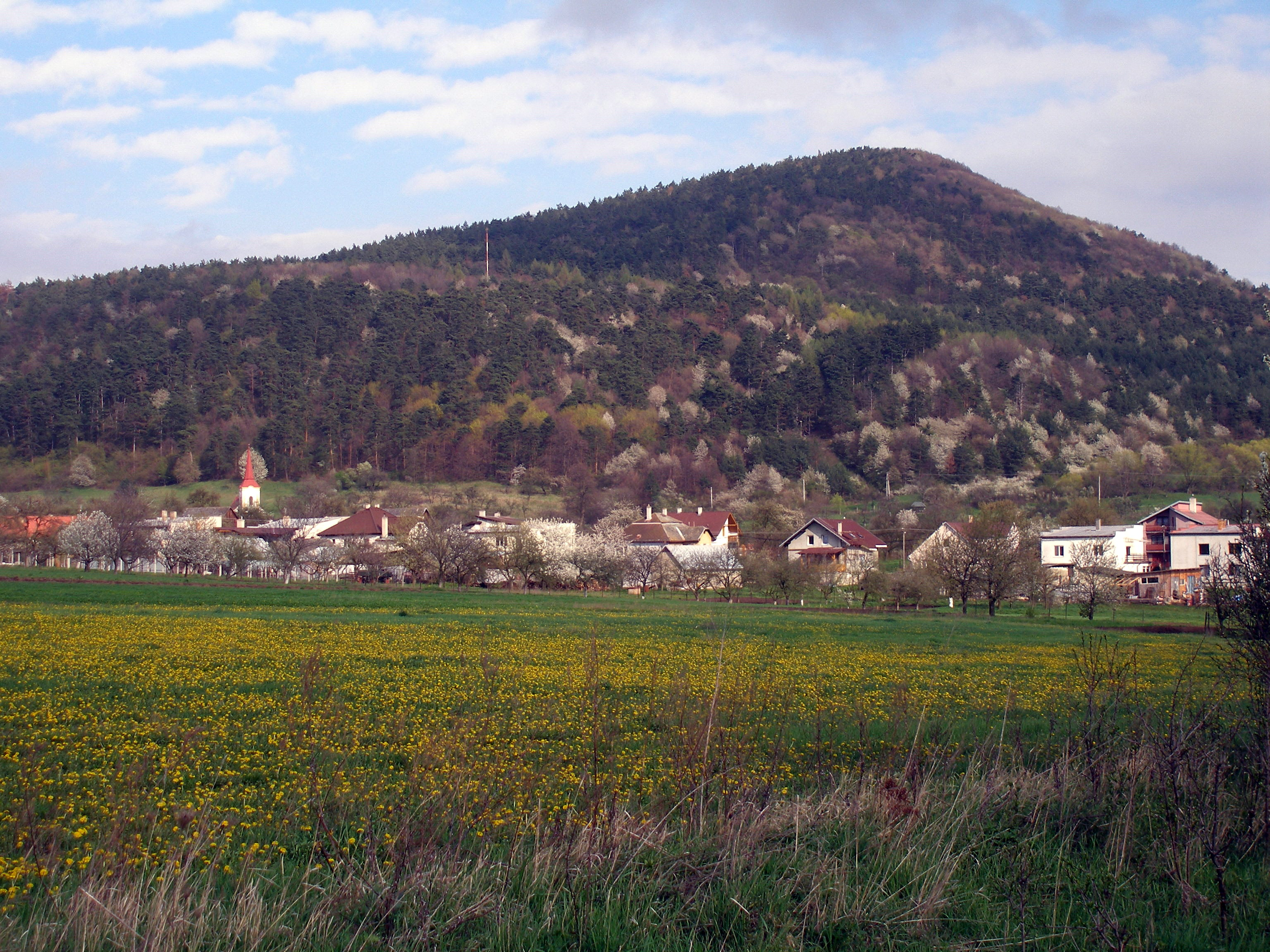

- Flag

- Location of Brestov in the Prešov Region Location of Brestov in Slovakia
- Coordinates: 48.87°N 21.35°E
- Country: Slovakia
- Region: Prešov Region
- District: Prešov District
- First mentioned: 1229

Area
  - Total: 10.36 km^{2} (4.00 sq mi)
- Elevation: 290 m (950 ft)

Population (2025)
  - Total: 456
- Time zone: UTC+1 (CET)
  - Summer (DST): UTC+2 (CEST)
- Postal code: 820 5
- Area code: +421 51
- Vehicle registration plate (until 2022): PO
- Website: www.brestov.sk

Brestov (Hungarian: Boroszló) is a village and municipality in Prešov District in the Prešov Region of eastern Slovakia.

== Geography ==
The municipality lies at an altitude of 290 metres (950 ft) and covers an area of 10.36 km^{2} (4.00 sq mi) (2025).

== Population ==
Population statistic (10 years)
Year	1995	2005	2015	2025
Count	482	452	441	456
Difference		−6.22%	−2.43%	+3.40%

Population statistic
Year	2024	2025
Count	461	456
Difference		−1.08%

It has a population of 456 people (31 December 2025).

=== Ethnicity ===
Census 2021 (1+ %)
Ethnicity	Number	Fraction
Slovak	442	98.66%
Not found out	7	1.56%
Total	448	

In year 2021 was 448 people by ethnicity 442 as Slovak, 7 as Not found out, 2 as Russian, 2 as Hungarian, 1 as Czech and 1 as English.

Note on population: The difference values of population numbers in the table "Population statistic" and in the sections "Ethnicity" & "Religion" is caused by the use of various statistical methods.

=== Religion ===
Census 2021 (1+ %)
Religion	Number	Fraction
Roman Catholic Church	385	85.94%
None	31	6.92%
Greek Catholic Church	17	3.79%
Not found out	6	1.34%
Total	448	

In year 2021 was 448 people by religion 385 from Roman Catholic Church, 31 from None, 17 from Greek Catholic Church, 6 from Not found out, 3 from Apostolic Church, 2 from Other and not ascertained christian church, 1 from Calvinist Church, 1 from Eastern Orthodox Church, 1 from Baptists Church and 1 from Ad hoc movements.

== Genealogical resources ==
The records for genealogical research are available at the state archive "Statny Archiv in Presov, Slovakia"

- Greek Catholic church records (births/marriages/deaths): 1773–1895(parish B)

== See also ==
- List of municipalities and towns in Slovakia
