= Zemplén County =

County of the Kingdom of Hungary

Zemplén County Comitatus Zemplinensis (Latin) Zemplén vármegye (Hungarian) Komitat Semplin (German) Zemplínska župa (Slovak) Комітат Земплін (Rusyn)
- County of the Kingdom of Hungary (11th century-1544); County of the Eastern Hungarian Kingdom (1544-1570); County of the Kingdom of Hungary (1570-1621); County of the Principality of Transylvania (1621-1629); County of the Kingdom of Hungary (1629-1645); County of the Principality of Transylvania (1645-1648); County of the Kingdom of Hungary (1648-1946); County of the Second Hungarian Republic (1946-1949); County of the Hungarian People's Republic (1949-1950)
- Coat of arms

- Capital: Zemplén; Sátoraljaújhely (1685-1950)
- Area
  - Coordinates: 48°23′N 21°39′E
  - 1910: 6,282 km^{2} (2,425 sq mi)
  - 1930: 1,776 km^{2} (686 sq mi)
- Population
  - 1910: 343,194
  - 1930: 146,318
- History
  - Established: 11th century
  - Treaty of Trianon: 4 June 1920
  - Merged into Borsod-Abaúj-Zemplén County: 16 March 1950
- Today part of: Slovakia (4,506 km^{2}); Hungary (1,776 km^{2})

Zemplén (Hungarian: Zemplén, Slovak: Zemplín, German: Semplin, Semmlin, Latin: Zemplinum) was an administrative county (comitatus) of the Kingdom of Hungary. The northern part of its territory is now situated in eastern Slovakia (Zemplín region), while a smaller southern portion of the former county belongs to Hungary, as part of Borsod-Abaúj-Zemplén County.

== Geography ==
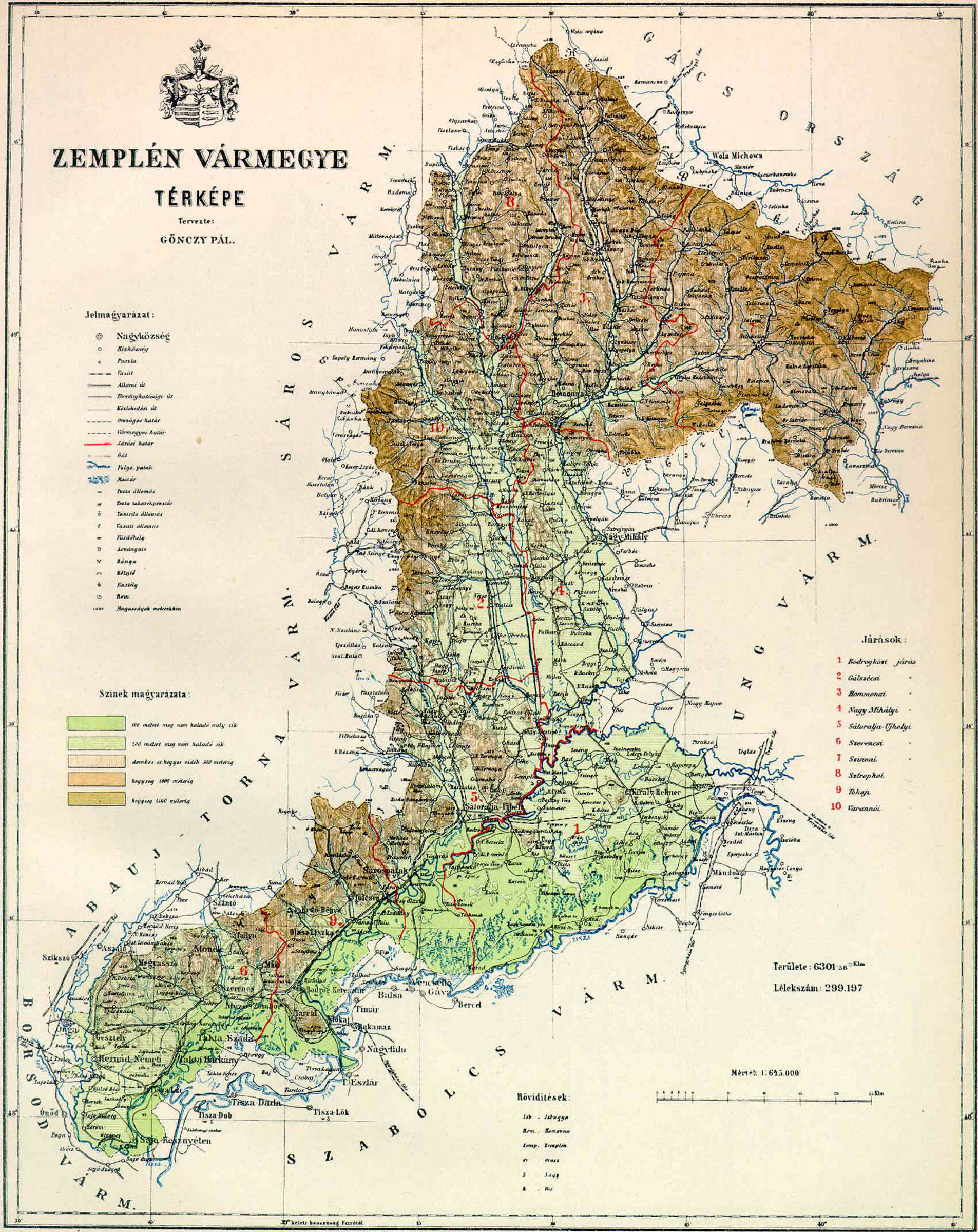
Map of Zemplén, 1891.

Zemplén county shared borders with Poland (during some periods with the Austrian crownland Galicia) and the Hungarian counties Sáros, Abaúj-Torna, Borsod, Szabolcs and Ung. It was situated in the easternmost strip of what is now Slovakia (except for the region between Vihorlatské vrchy and the Latorica river), plus a strip along the Bodrog and Tisza rivers in present-day Hungary. The rivers Laborc and Bodrog flowed through the county. Its area was 6,269 km^{2} around 1910.

== Capitals ==
Initially, the capital of the county was the Zemplín Castle (Hungarian: Zempléni vár, Slovak: Zemplínsky hrad), in the 13th century also Sárospatak (in Slovak: Potok, meaning stream, brook, hence the alternative name of the county comitatus de Potok). Since the Late Middle Ages the capital was the town of Zemplén, and since 1748 was Sátoraljaújhely (which is now divided between Slovakia and Hungary by the Ronyva/Roňava stream; the Hungarian part is known in Slovak as Nové Mesto pod Šiatrom and the Slovak part is now a separate village called Slovenské Nové Mesto).

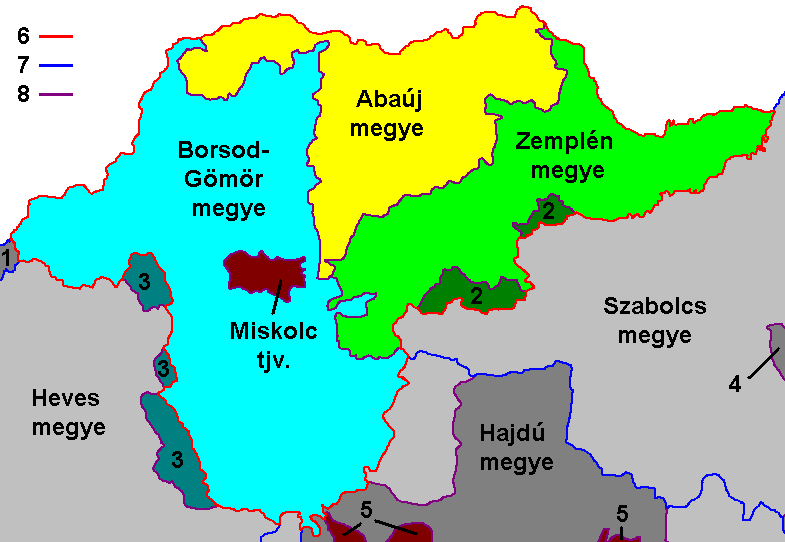
Borsod-Gömör, Abaúj, and Zemplén counties after World War II. In 1950, the three counties were merged to form the modern Borsod-Abaúj-Zemplén County. (1) Nógrád-Hont County (2) territories assigned from Szabolcs County to Borsod-Abaúj-Zemplén County. (3) territories assigned from Borsod-Gömör County to Heves County. (5) the city of Debrecen (urban county).

== History ==
Zemplén was one of the oldest counties of the Kingdom of Hungary. In the aftermath of World War I, in 1920 by the Treaty of Trianon the northern part of Zemplén county became part of newly formed Czechoslovakia. The southern half (including the bigger part of the divided Sátoraljaújhely) stayed in Hungary as the county of Zemplén. Following the provisions of the First Vienna Award, an additional part became part of Hungary again in November 1938. The Trianon borders were restored after World War II, and the Hungarian county Zemplén merged with Abaúj, the most of Borsod-Gömör and a little part of Szabolcs counties to form the present Borsod-Abaúj-Zemplén County.

== Demographics ==
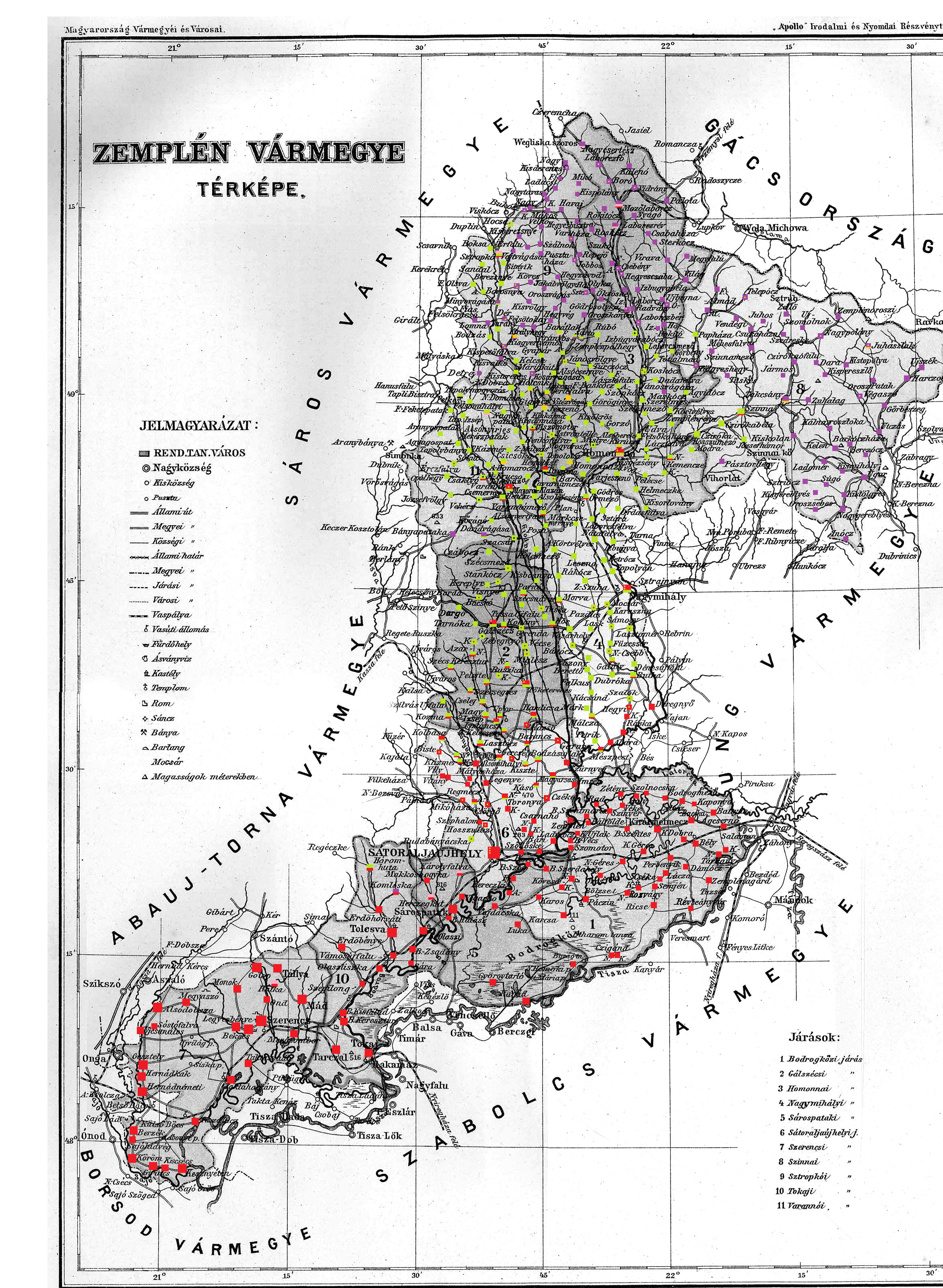
Ethnic map of the county with data of the 1910 census (see the key in the description).

Population by mother tongue (Note: Only linguistic communities > 1% are displayed.)
Census	Total	Hungarian	Slovak	Ruthenian	German	Other or unknown
1880	275,175	119,656 (44.73%)	102,730 (38.40%)	30,207 (11.29%)	12,977 (4.85%)	1,932 (0.72%)
1890	299,197	141,188 (47.19%)	107,477 (35.92%)	31,036 (10.37%)	15,511 (5.18%)	3,985 (1.33%)
1900	327,993	174,107 (53.08%)	106,114 (32.35%)	34,831 (10.62%)	8,072 (2.46%)	4,869 (1.48%)
1910	343,194	193,794 (56.47%)	92,943 (27.08%)	39,033 (11.37%)	9,749 (2.84%)	7,675 (2.24%)

Population by religion (Note: Only religious communities > 1% are displayed.)
Census	Total	Roman Catholic	Greek Catholic	Calvinist	Jewish	Lutheran	Other or unknown
1880	275,175	100,091 (36.37%)	83,696 (30.42%)	53,252 (19.35%)	31,622 (11.49%)	6,416 (2.33%)	98 (0.04%)
1890	299,197	110,982 (37.09%)	92,220 (30.82%)	58,671 (19.61%)	30,491 (10.19%)	6,780 (2.27%)	53 (0.02%)
1900	327,993	123,967 (37.80%)	101,053 (30.81%)	64,457 (19.65%)	31,533 (9.61%)	6,807 (2.08%)	176 (0.05%)
1910	343,194	132,395 (38.58%)	103,118 (30.05%)	67,557 (19.68%)	33,041 (9.63%)	6,822 (1.99%)	261 (0.08%)

== Subdivisions ==
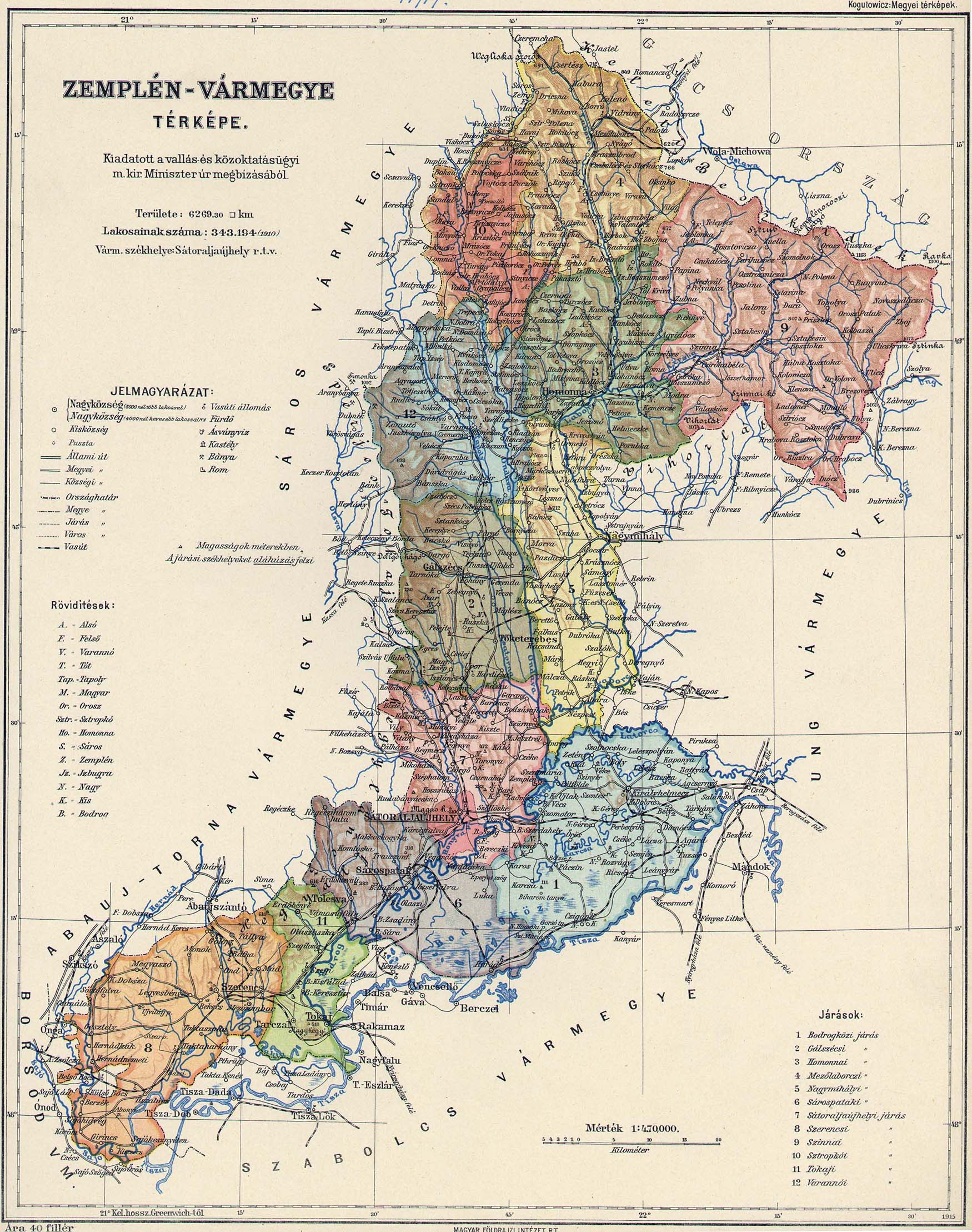

In the early 20th century, the subdivisions of Zemplén county were:

Districts (járás)
District	Capital
Bodrogköz	Királyhelmec (now Kráľovský Chlmec)
Gálszécs	Gálszécs (now Sečovce)
Homonna	Homonna (now Humenné)
Mezőlaborc	Mezőlaborc (now Medzilaborce)
Nagymihály	Nagymihály (now Michalovce)
Sárospatak	Sárospatak
Sátoraljaújhely	Sátoraljaújhely
Szerencs	Szerencs
Szinna	Szinna (now Snina)
Sztropkó	Sztropkó (now Stropkov)
Tokaj	Tokaj
Varannó	Varannó (now Vranov nad Topľou)
Urban districts (rendezett tanácsú város)
Sátoraljaújhely

The towns of Sátoraljaújhely, Sárospatak, Tokaj and Szerencs are now in Hungary, except for a small northern part (about a quarter) of Sátoraljaújhely to the northeast of the Ronyva (Rožňava) stream in Slovakia, now a small village with its own artificial Slovak name Slovenské Nové Mesto.

== Notable people ==
- Demetrius Futaki (d. 1372), born at Mézes in Zemplén county
