= Lecanora substerilis =

Scientific classification
- Domain: Eukaryota
- Kingdom: Fungi
- Division: Ascomycota
- Class: Lecanoromycetes
- Order: Lecanorales
- Family: Lecanoraceae
- Genus: Lecanora
- Species: L. substerilis

Binomial name
- Lecanora substerilis Malíček & Vondrák (2017)

Species of lichen

Lecanora substerilis is a species of corticolous (bark-dwelling), crustose lichen in the family Lecanoraceae. It is found in Eastern Europe, in old-growth beech forests of the Carpathian Mountains in the Czech Republic, Slovakia, Romania and Ukraine.

== Taxonomy ==
The lichen was formally described as a new species in 2017 by Jiří Malíček and Zdeněk Vondrák. The type specimen was collected from a valley in the protected area Stužica (Nová Sedlica, Poloniny Mountains, Slovakia), at an altitude of 600 to 800 m (2,000 to 2,600 ft). The species epithet alludes to the fact that the lichen is mostly encountered in the sterile state (i.e., lacking apothecia), and fertile specimens are rare. Lecanora substerilis belongs to the Lecanora subfusca species group.

== Description ==
Lecanora substerilis has a matt and grey crustose thallus that forms patches up to 5 cm (2.0 in) in diameter; the prothallus is either indistinct or whitish-grey. In sterile individuals, the thallus is thin, less than 0.5 mm thick, while the rare fertile specimens have a more-developed thallus up to 0.5 mm thick that often forms pustules. These pustules are filled with crystals of calcium oxalate. The species contains atranorin and roccellic acid, which are lichen products that can be detected using thin-layer chromatography; sometimes an unidentified fatty acid is also present.

== Habitat and distribution ==
Lecanora substerilis occurs primarily in old-growth Carpathian beech forests, and has been recorded growing at elevations between 450 and 1,235 m (1,476 and 4,052 ft). In addition to Slovakia, it has been found in the Uholka-Shyrokyi Luh primeval beech forest in Ukraine, the Parâng Mountains of Romania, and in the Beskid Mountains in the Czech Republic.

== See also ==
- List of Lecanora species
