= Topoľa =

- Municipality
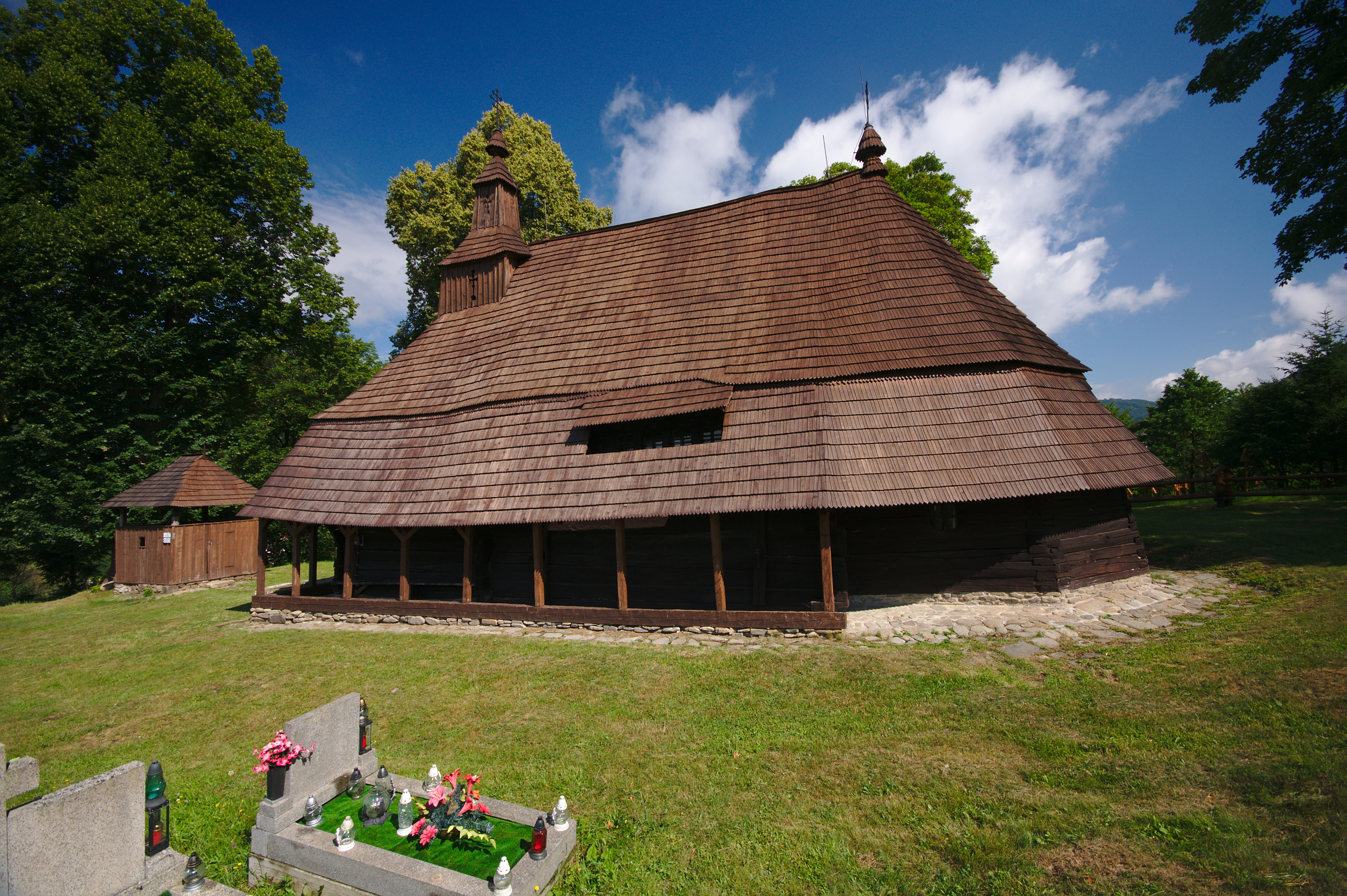

- Flag

- Location of Topoľa in the Prešov Region Location of Topoľa in Slovakia
- Coordinates: 49.05°N 22.37°E
- Country: Slovakia
- Region: Prešov Region
- District: Snina District
- First mentioned: 1337

Area
  - Total: 26.40 km^{2} (10.19 sq mi)
- Elevation: 381 m (1,250 ft)

Population (2025)
  - Total: 149
- Time zone: UTC+1 (CET)
  - Summer (DST): UTC+2 (CEST)
- Postal code: 676 5
- Area code: +421 57
- Vehicle registration plate (until 2022): SV
- Website: topola.sk

Topoľa (Rusyn: Тополя, Hungarian: Kistopolya) is a village and municipality in Snina District in the Prešov Region of north-eastern Slovakia.

== Geography ==
The municipality is located in Snina District in the Prešov Region of north-eastern Slovakia. The municipality lies at an altitude of 381 metres (1,250 ft) and covers an area of 26.40 km^{2} (10.19 sq mi) (2025).

== Population ==
Population statistic (10 years)
Year	1995	2005	2015	2025
Count	241	183	148	149
Difference		−24.06%	−19.12%	+0.67%

Population statistic
Year	2024	2025
Count	152	149
Difference		−1.97%

It has a population of 149 people (31 December 2025).

=== Ethnicity ===
Census 2021 (1+ %)
Ethnicity	Number	Fraction
Slovak	96	60.37%
Rusyn	85	53.45%
Ukrainian	7	4.4%
Not found out	5	3.14%
Total	159	

In year 2021 was 159 people by ethnicity 96 as Slovak, 85 as Rusyn, 7 as Ukrainian, 5 as Not found out, 1 as Czech, 1 as Serbian and 1 as Polish.

Note on population: The difference values of population numbers in the table "Population statistic" and in the sections "Ethnicity" & "Religion" is caused by the use of various statistical methods.

=== Religion ===
Census 2021 (1+ %)
Religion	Number	Fraction
Greek Catholic Church	130	81.76%
None	14	8.81%
Not found out	5	3.14%
Roman Catholic Church	4	2.52%
Eastern Orthodox Church	4	2.52%
Other and not ascertained christian church	2	1.26%
Total	159	

In year 2021 was 159 people by religion 130 from Greek Catholic Church, 14 from None, 5 from Not found out, 4 from Roman Catholic Church, 4 from Eastern Orthodox Church and 2 from Other and not ascertained christian church.

== History ==
In historical records, the village was first mentioned in 1337. The Greek Catholic wooden church of Archangel Michael located on the hill above the village dates back as far as 1700. There is a cemetery of soldiers, who fell in World War I, adjacent to the church. The name of the village is derived from topoľ, the poplar tree.

Before the establishment of independent Czechoslovakia in 1918, Topoľa was part of Zemplén County within the Kingdom of Hungary. In 1939, it was for a short time part of the Slovak Republic. From 1939 to 1944, as a result of the Slovak–Hungarian War of 1939, it was again part of Hungary. On 26 October 1944, the Red Army entered Topoľa and it was once again part of Czechoslovakia.

== Protected areas and natural landmarks ==
The municipality is situated in the buffer zone of the Poloniny National Park. It offers easy access to most of the National Park's hiking trails. Havešová, a component of the Primeval Beech Forests of the Carpathians UNESCO World Heritage Site, is also located close to the village.

== Gallery ==
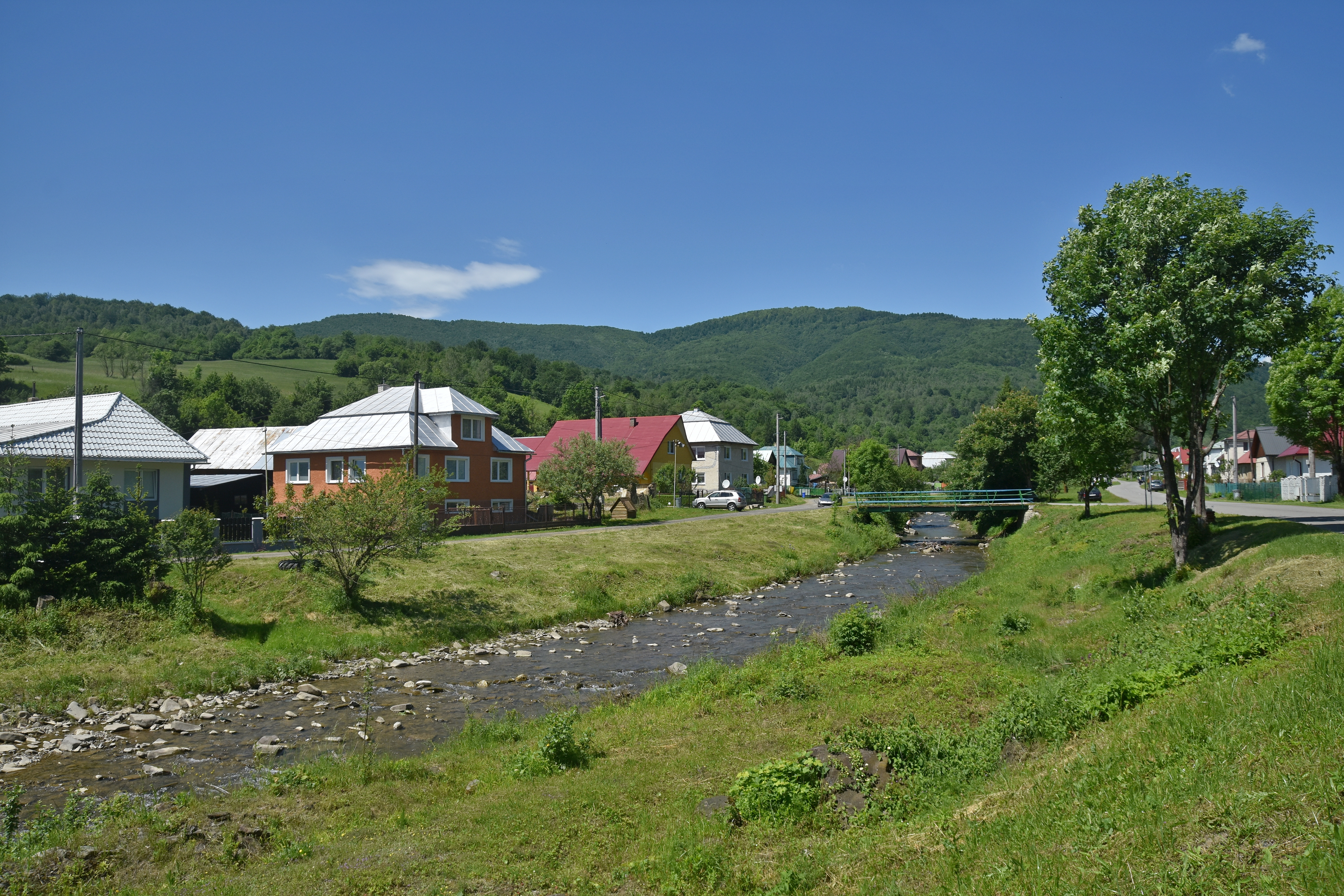
Main street in Topoľa, the Ulička stream at the centre

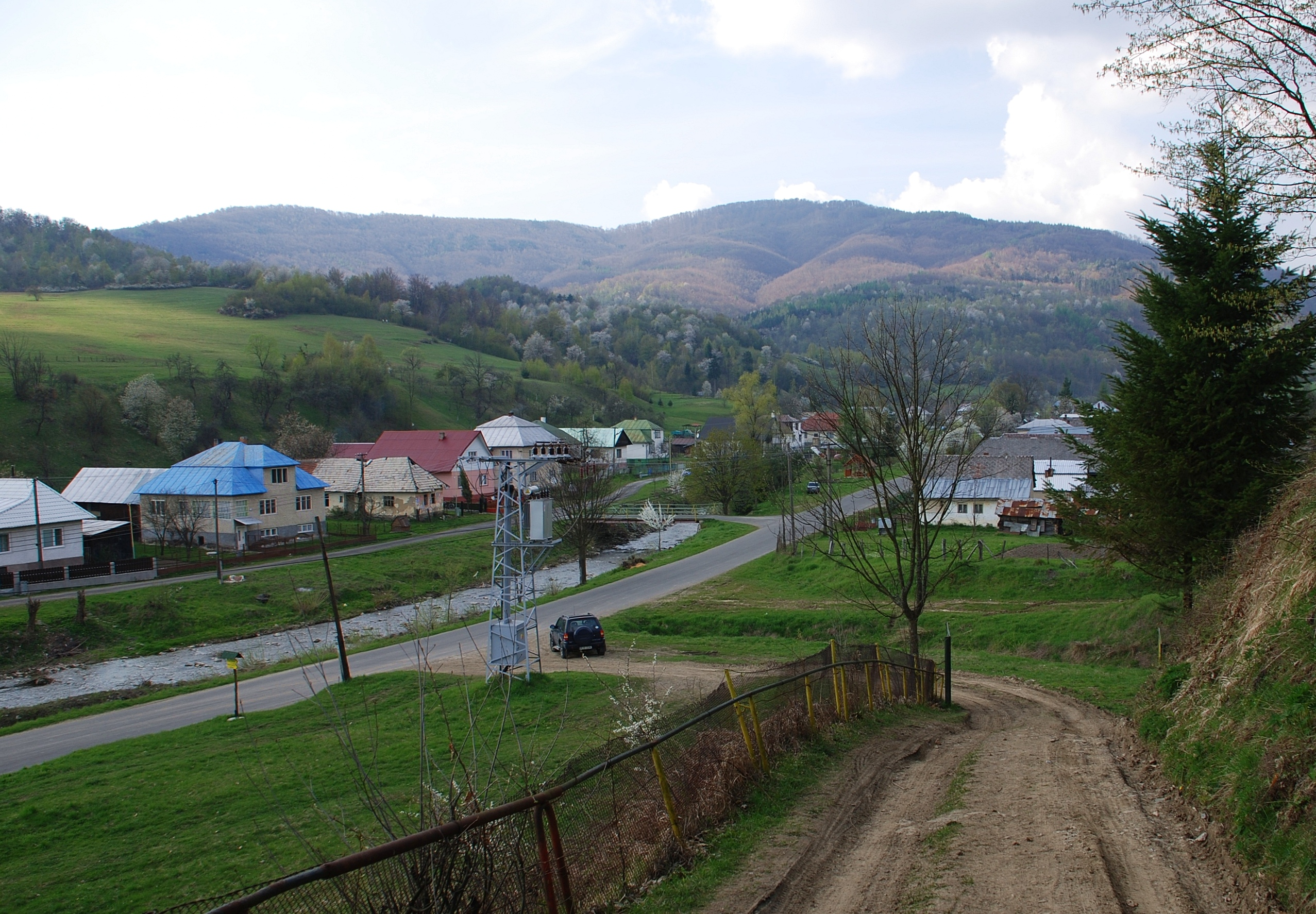
Street in Topoľa and access road to the Church of Saint Michael and communal cemetery

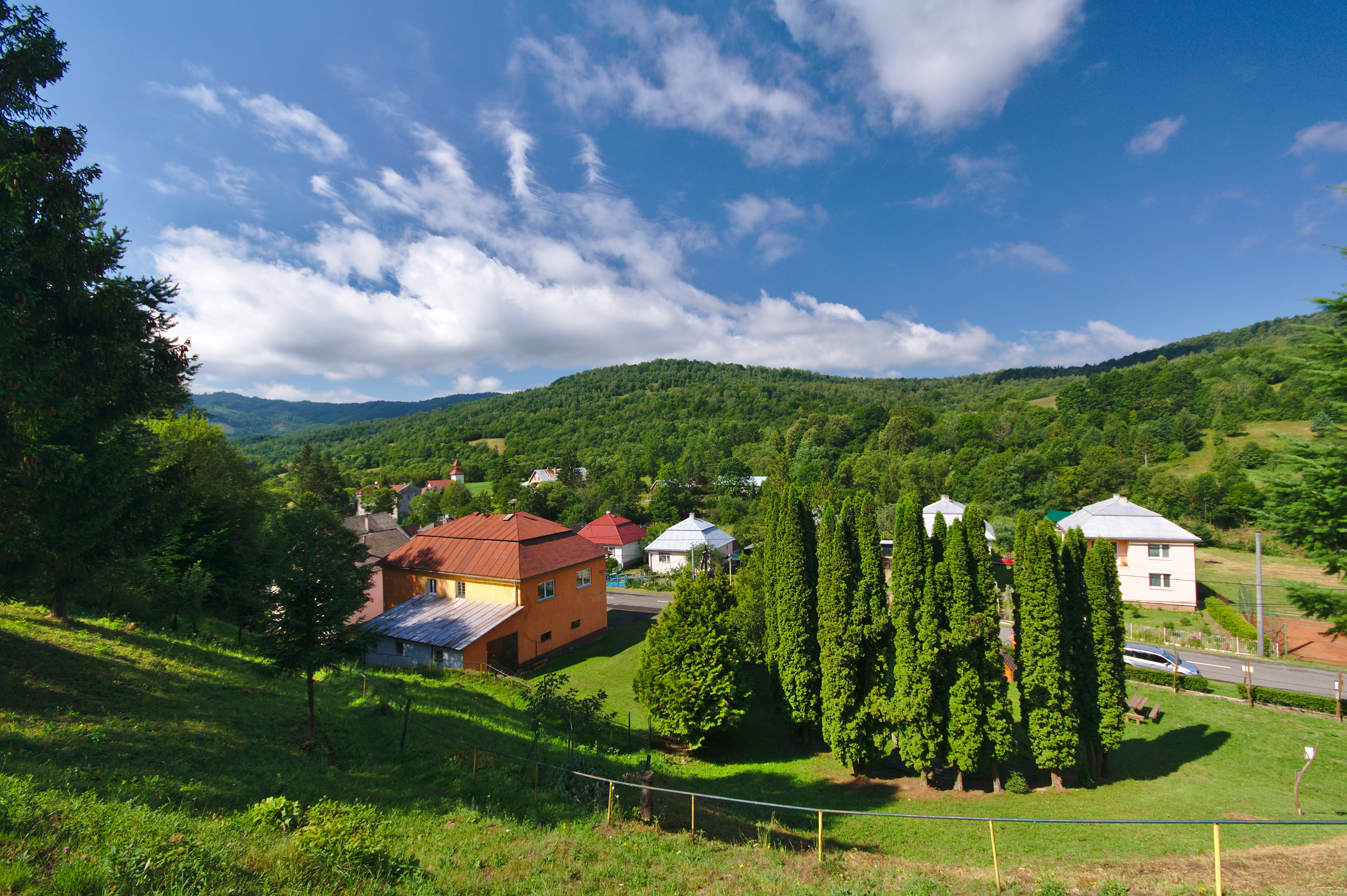
View of the village from the wooden church

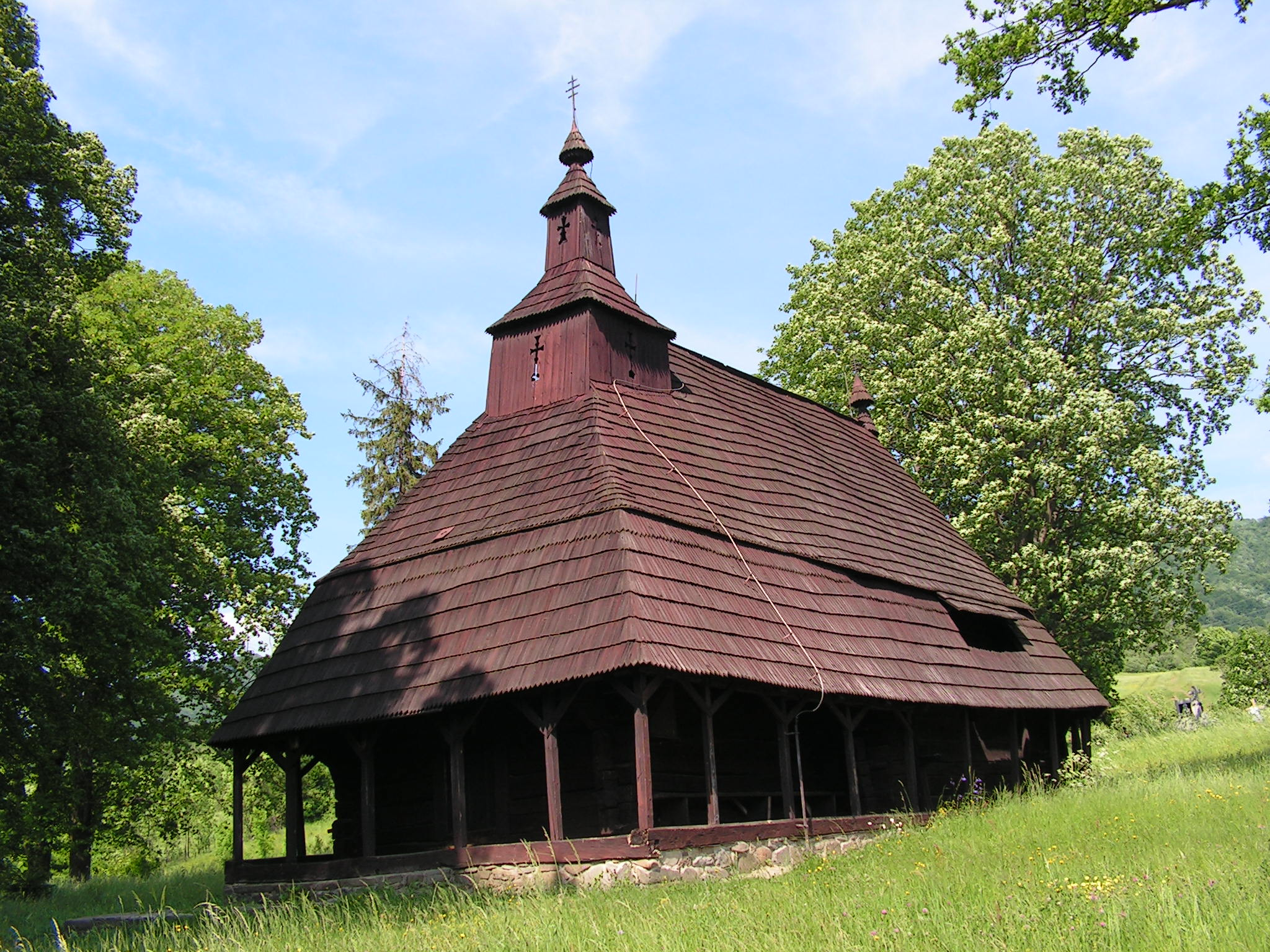
Wooden church of Saint Michael in Topoľa

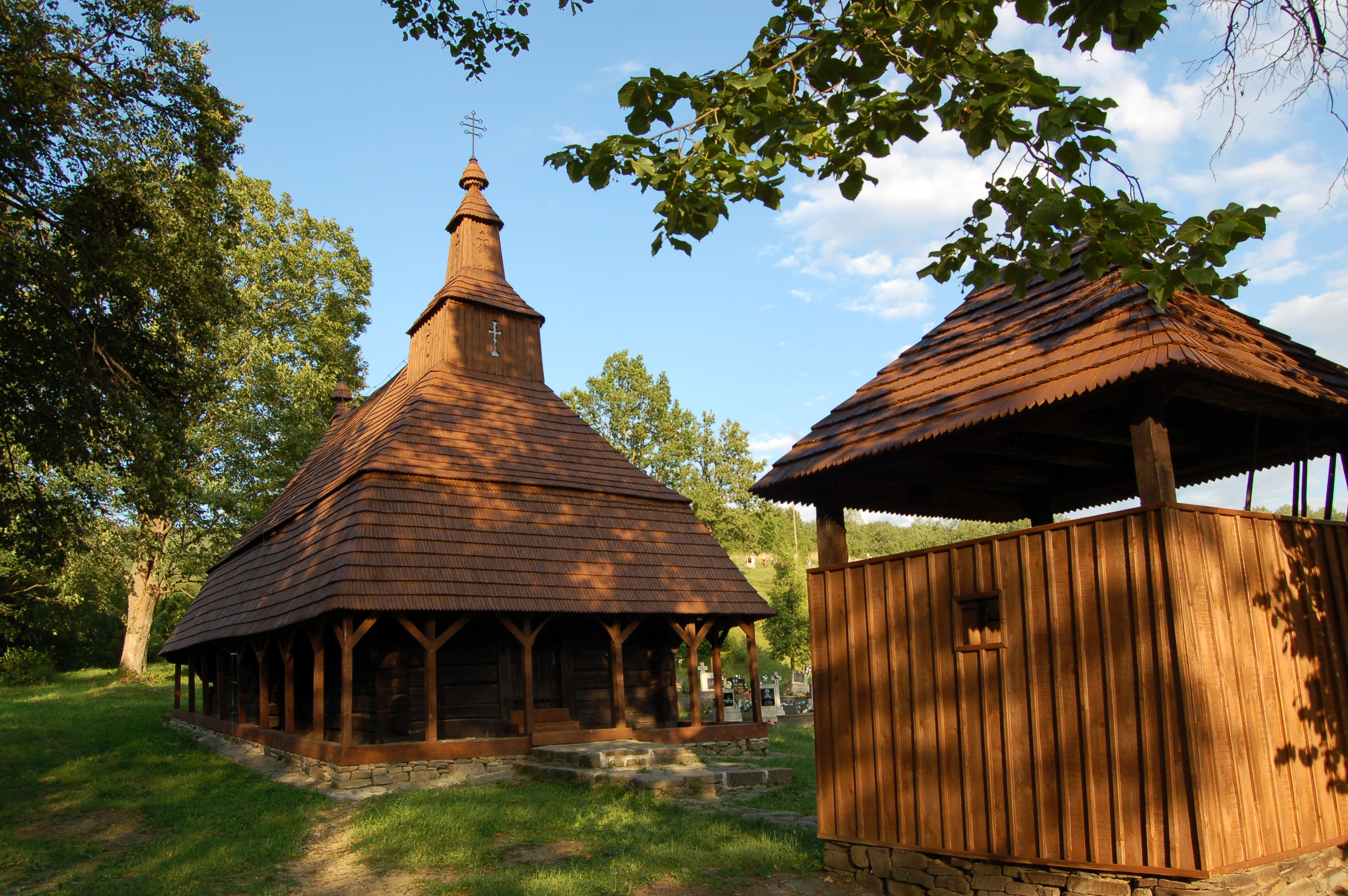
Wooden church of Saint Michael and wooden belfry in Topoľa

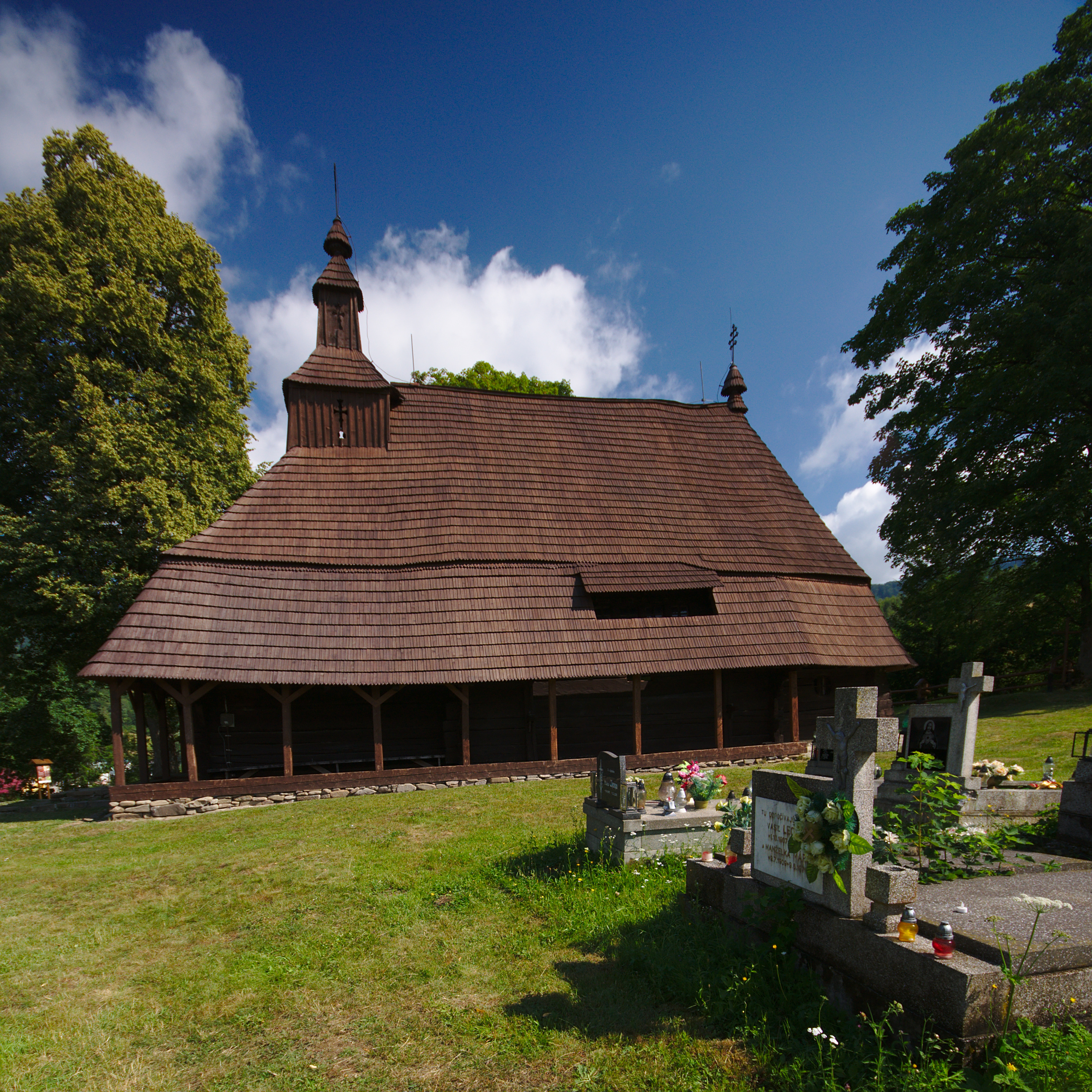
Wooden church of Saint Michael in Topoľa

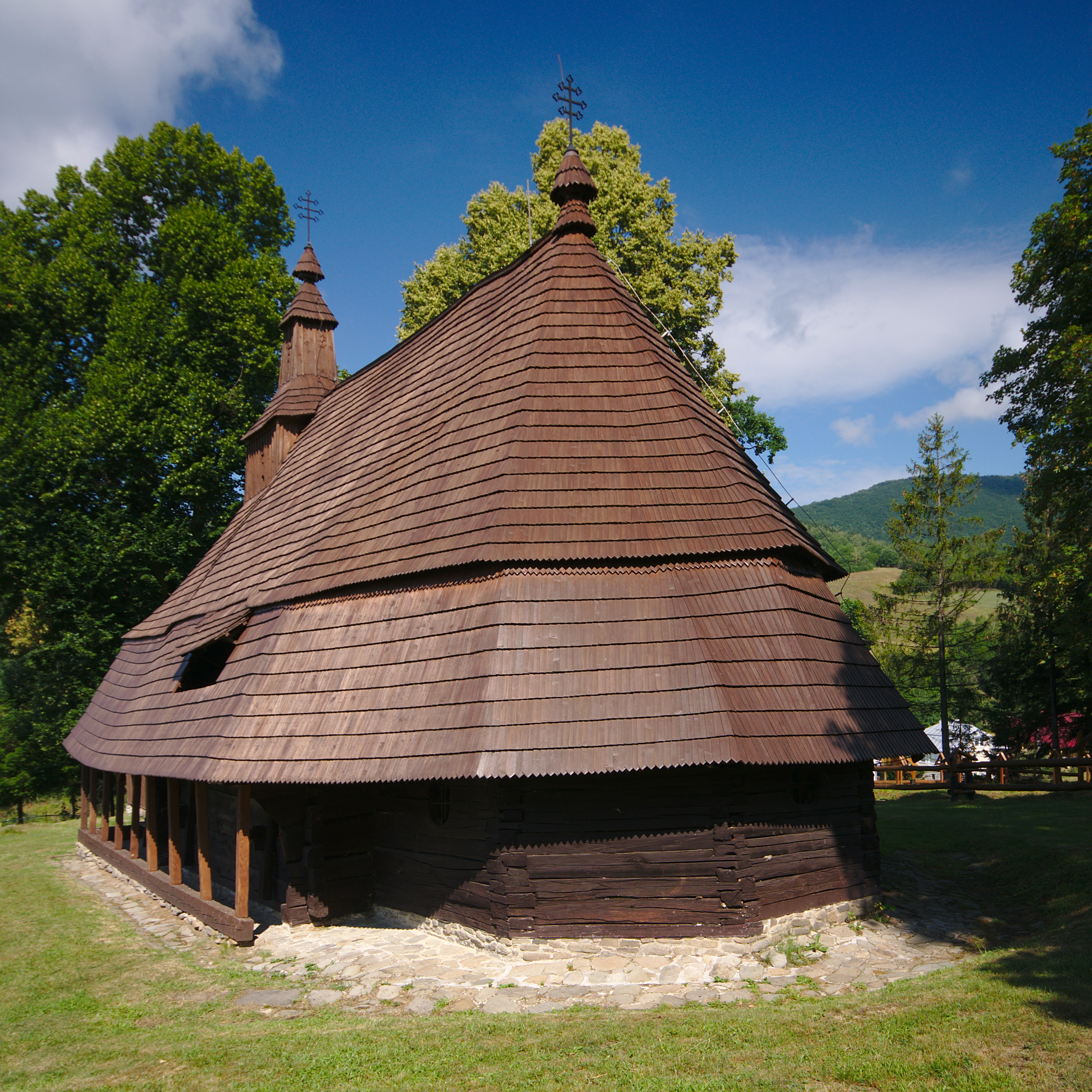
Wooden church of Saint Michael in Topoľa

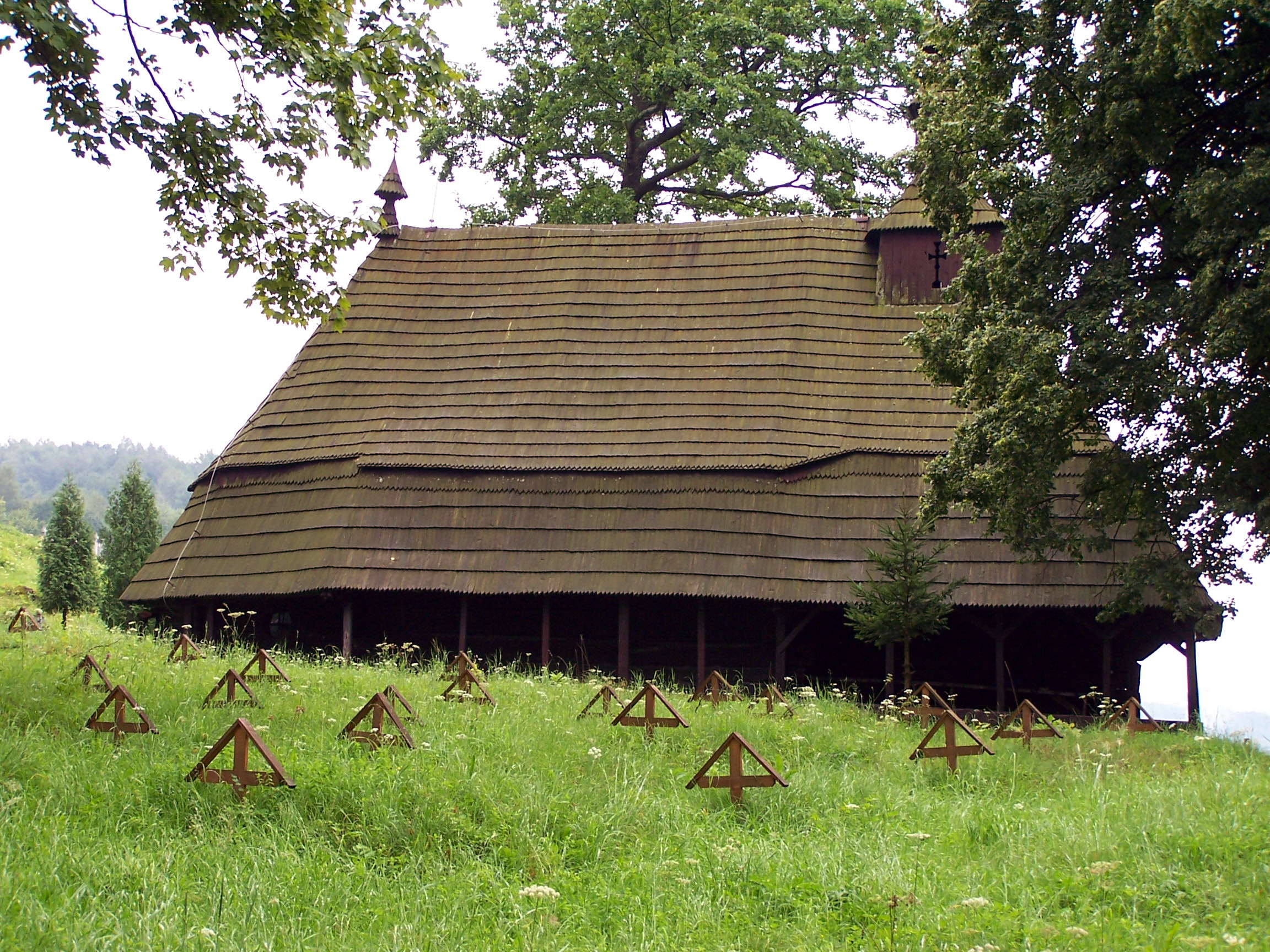
Wooden church of Saint Michael in Topoľa

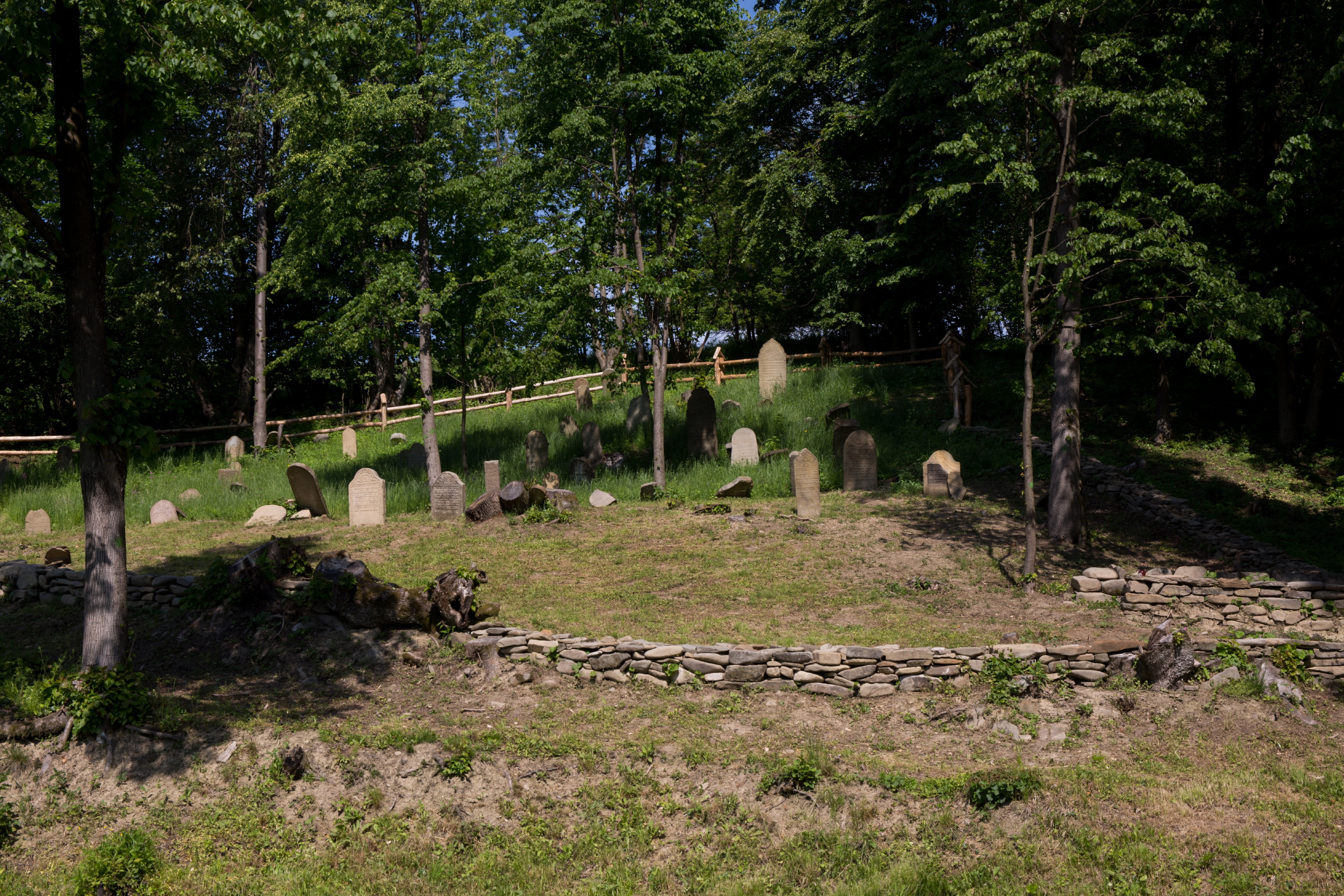
Jewish cemetery in Topoľa

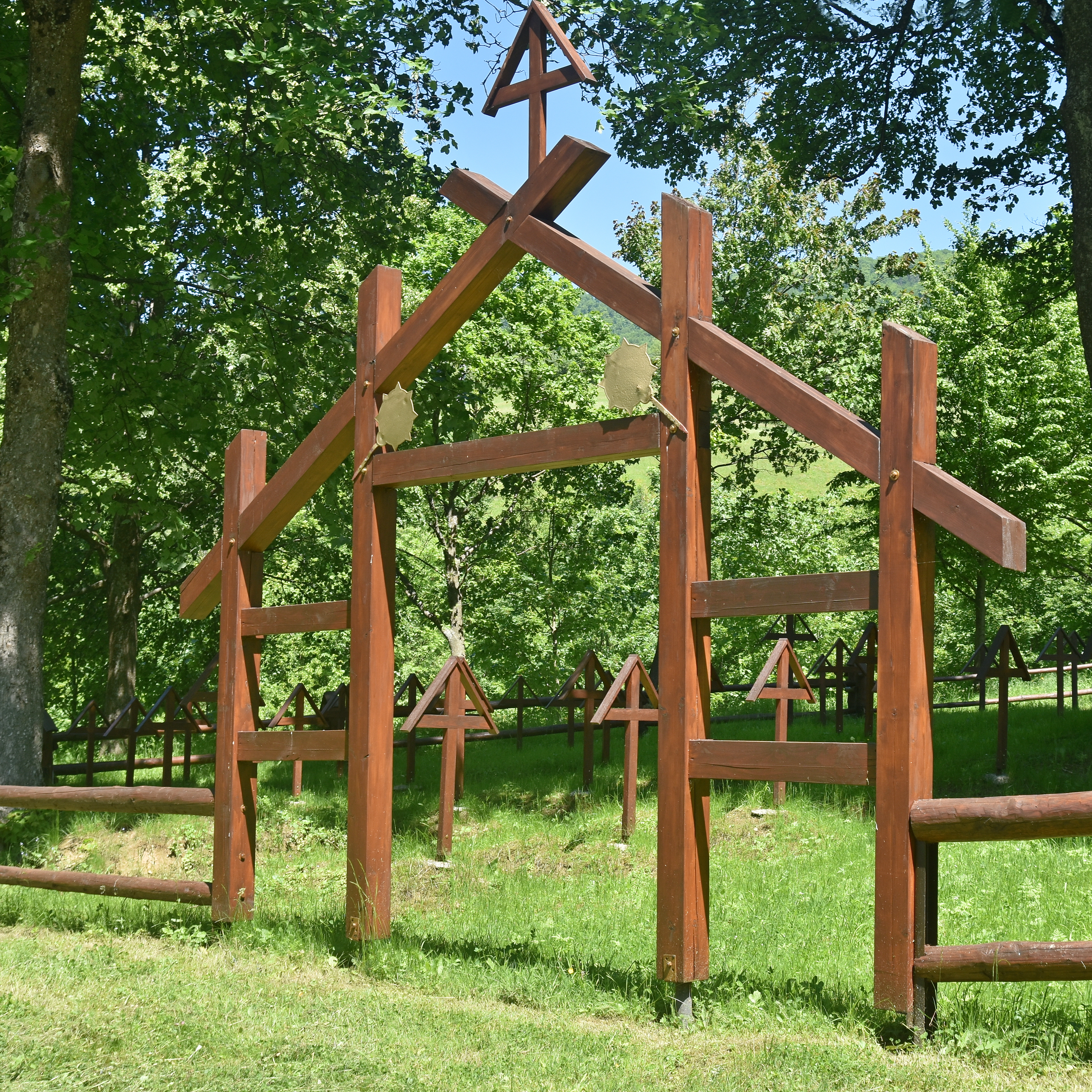
First world war military cemetery

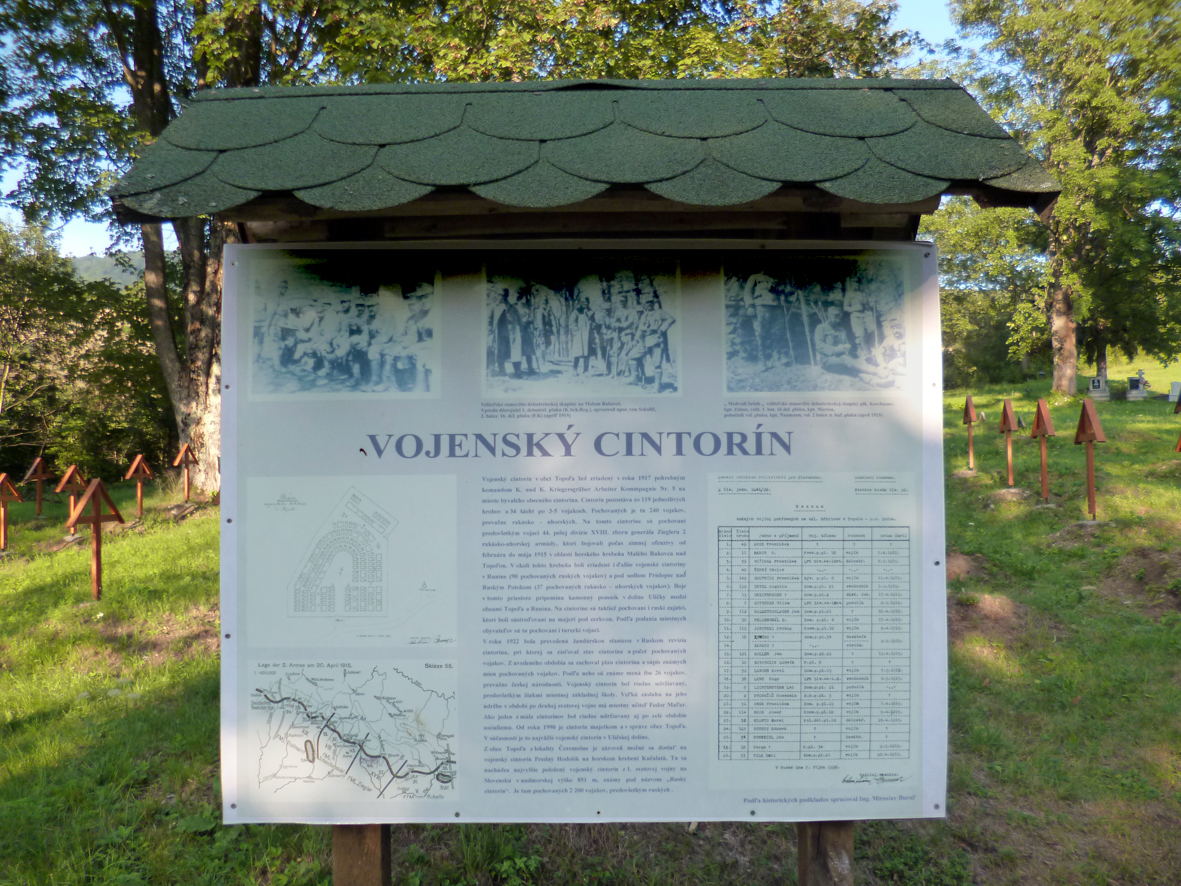
First world war military cemetery

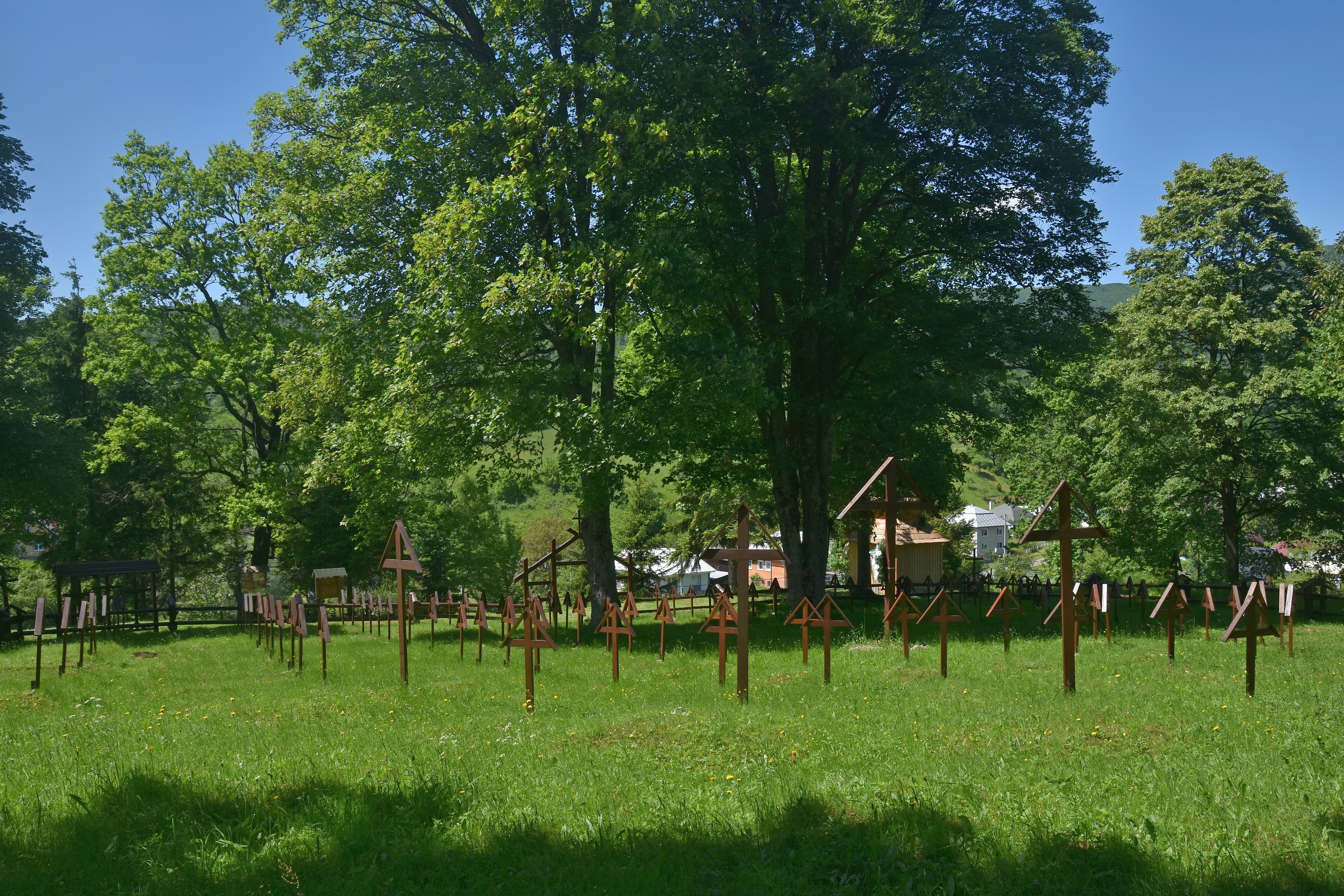
First world war military cemetery

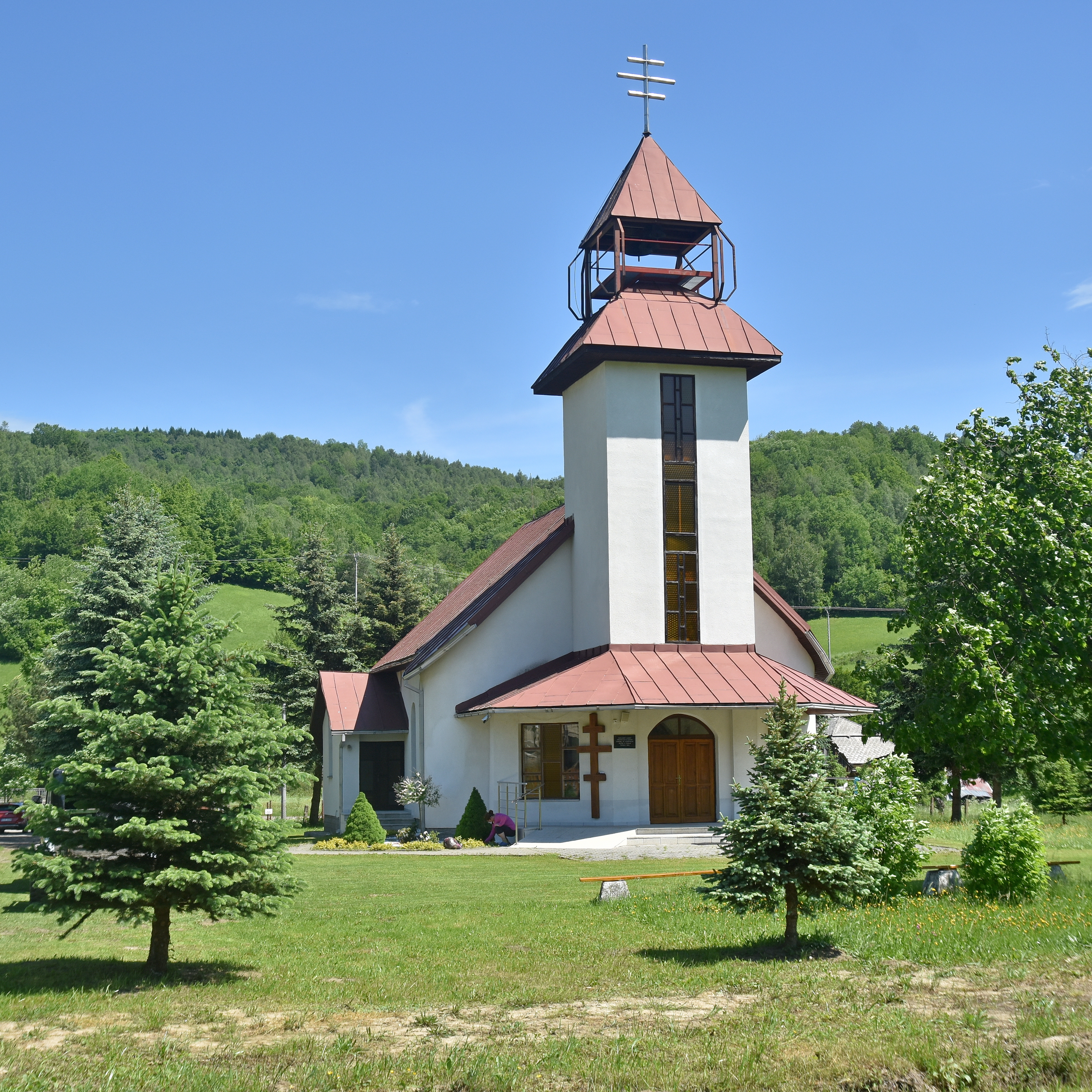
Modern church of Saint Peter and Paul in Topoľa

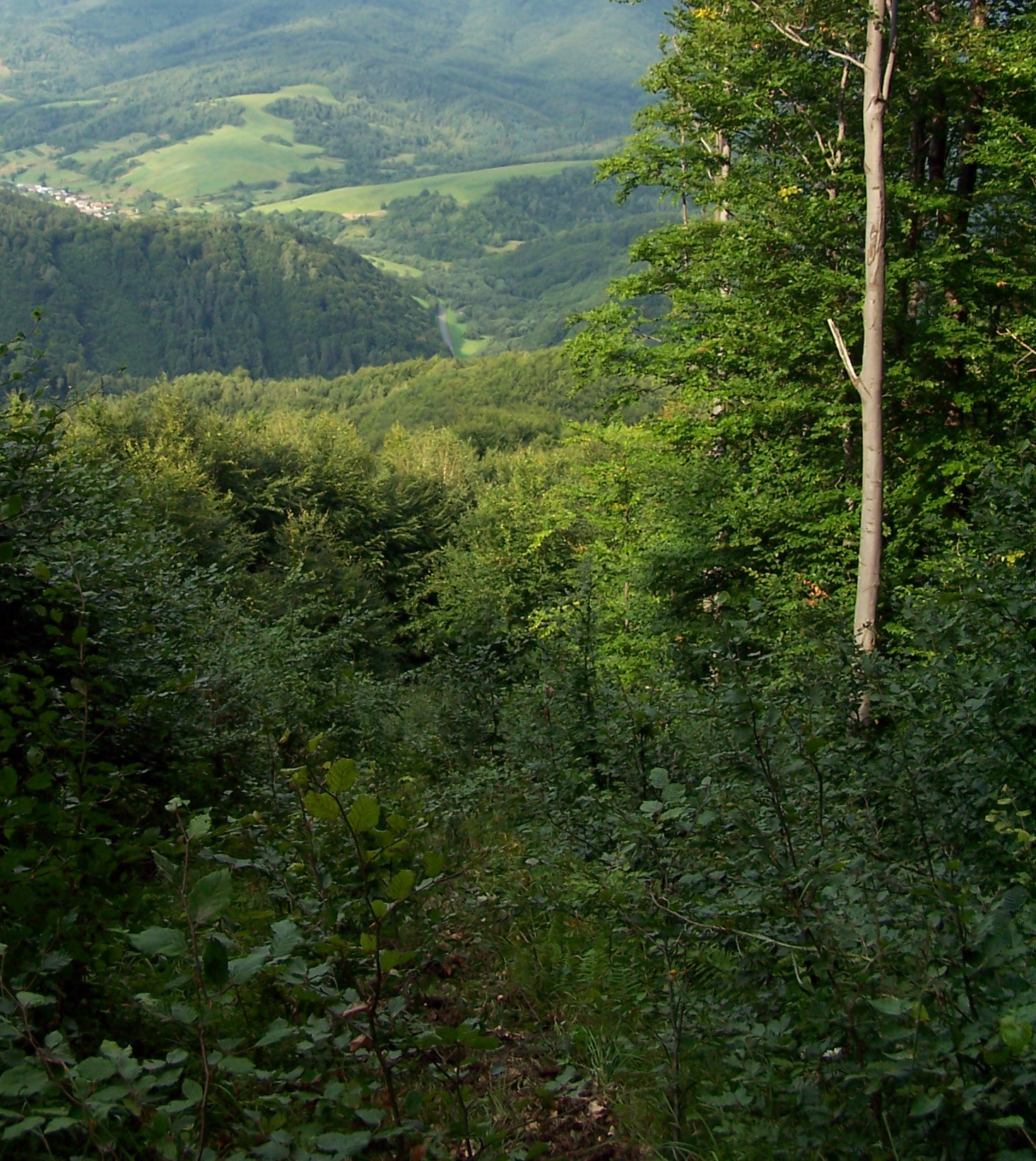
View from the end of Havešová towards the village of Topoľa (upper left)

== See also ==
- Bukovské vrchy
- Stužica
- Poloniny National Park
