= Poloniny National Park =

National park in Slovakia

Coordinates: 49°02′42″N 22°25′30″E

Poloniny
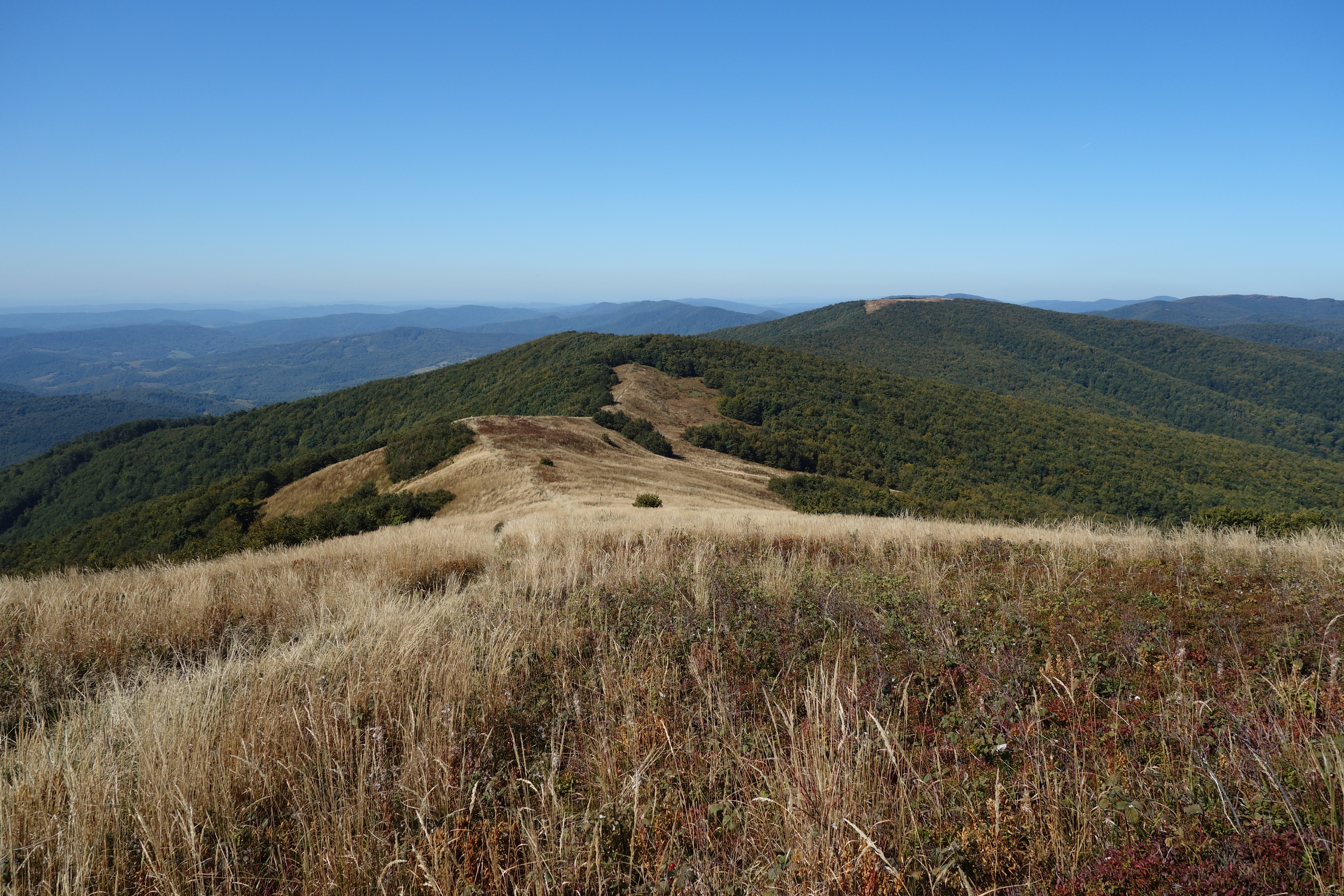
- A typical meadow (polonyna)

- Location in Slovakia
- Location: Snina, Prešov, Slovakia
- Area: 40,688 ha (157.10 sq mi)
- Established: 1 October 1997
- Named for: typical poloniny meadows
- Operator: Správa NP Poloniny
- Website: www.sopsr.sk/nppoloniny/

Poloniny National Park (Slovak: Národný park Poloniny) is a national park in northeastern Slovakia at the Polish and Ukrainian borders, in the Bukovské vrchy mountain range, which belongs to the Eastern Carpathians. It was created on 1 October 1997 with a protected area of 298.05 km^{2} (115.08 sq mi) and a buffer zone of 109.73 km^{2} (42.37 sq mi). Selected areas of the park are included in the Primeval Beech Forests of the Carpathians UNESCO World Heritage Site.

== Location ==
The park is located in the Snina District in the Prešov Region. It is adjacent to Bieszczady National Park in Poland; together they are part of the East Carpathian Biosphere Reserve. The highest point lies at 1,208 m (3,963 ft) AMSL on a point where the borders of Slovakia, Poland and Ukraine meet, near the summit of the mount Kremenec. The National Park is the easternmost and least populated area of the country. Hiking trails start from several villages, most notably Nová Sedlica but also from Runina, Topoľan and Uličské Krivé.

== Biology and ecology ==
Forests cover about 80% of the area; beech and beech-fir forests are dominant. The National Park has the highest concentration of old growth forests in Slovakia, which are protected by national nature reserves. Meadows, called poloniny in Eastern Slovak dialects, situated on the main ridge of the Bukovské vrchy mountain range are common.

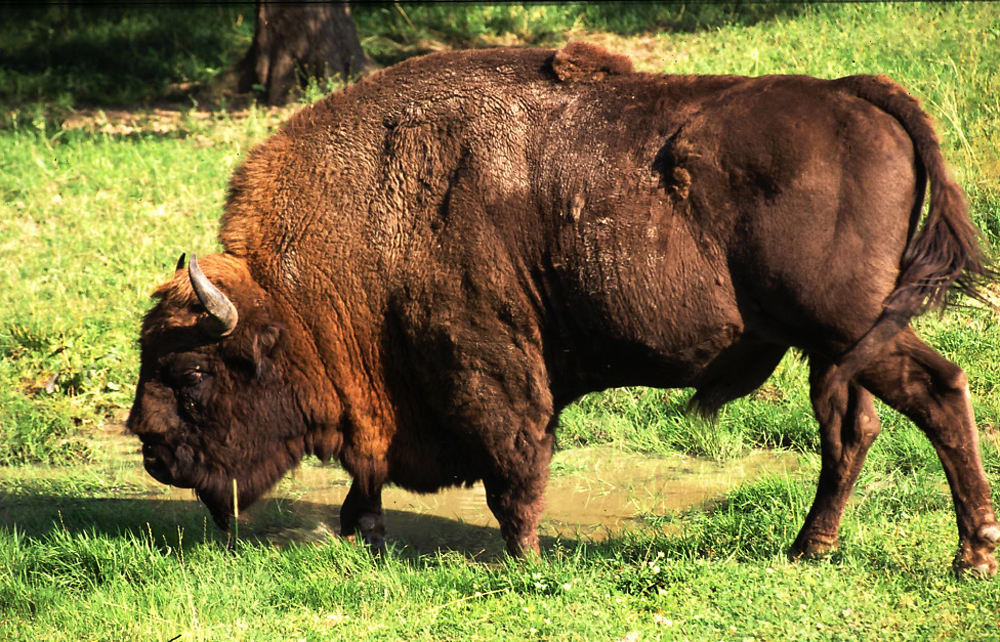
European bison

Many species found in the park are endemic and rare. Altogether, 800 fungi and 100 lichens are native to Poloniny. Poloniny National Park contains about 5,981 known species of invertebrates (for example, 91 molluscs, 1,472 true bugs, 819 butterflies, and 403 spiders) and 294 vertebrates. Among the vertebrates are 13 species of amphibians, 8 reptiles, 198 birds, 55 mammals, including the Eurasian lynx, bear, and others. About 1,000 species of vascular plants have been found in the park. Many of them are endangered and protected. A small herd of wisent (Bison Bonasus) was reintroduced in the area in 2004.

== Tourism ==
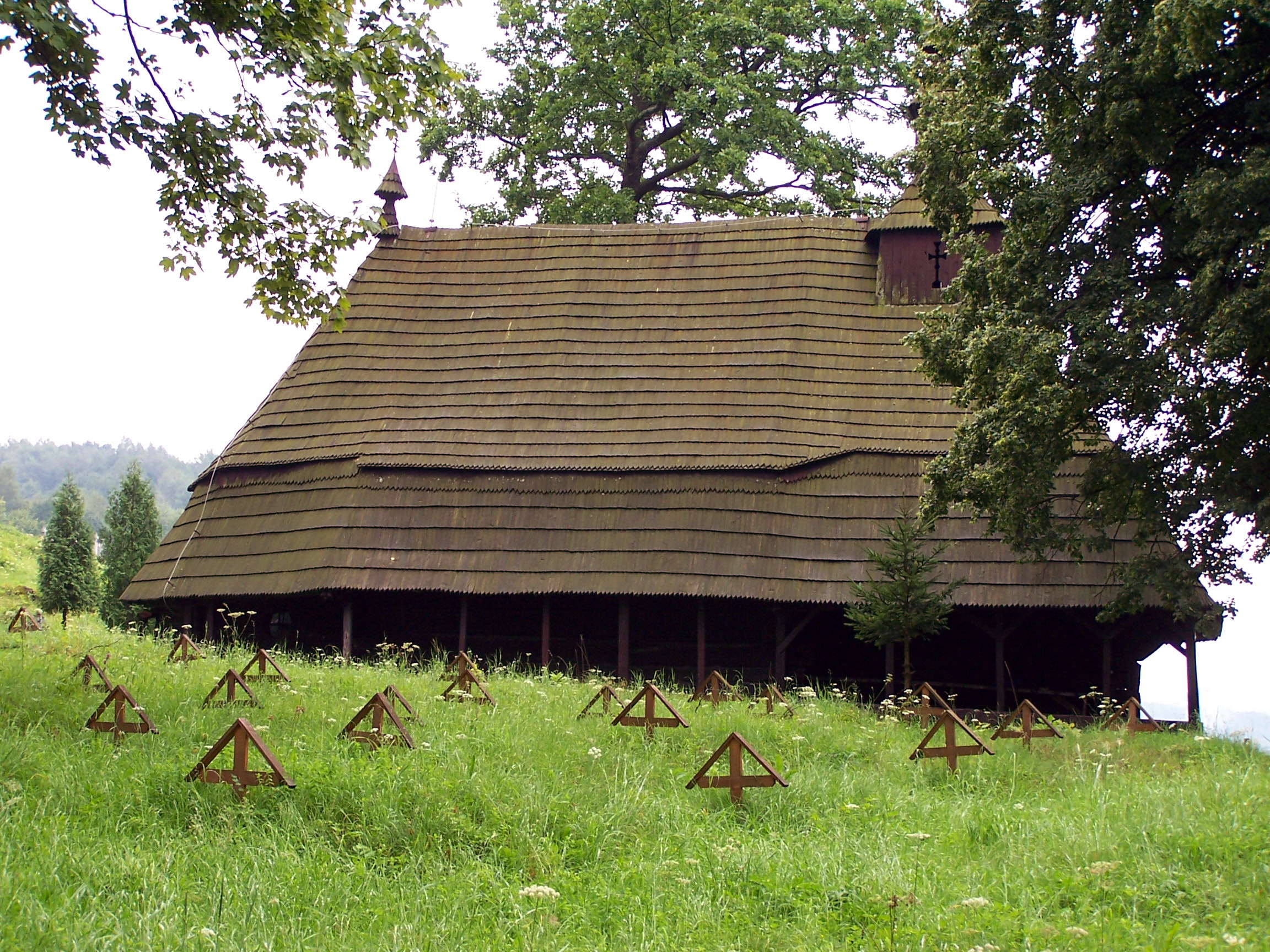
Wooden church in Topoľa

The National Park is open to the public all year with winter (cross-country skiing) as well as summer hiking trails. Besides several mountain trails there is also one connecting outstanding wooden churches from the 18th century in Topoľa, Uličské Krivé, and Ruský Potok.

== World Heritage Site ==
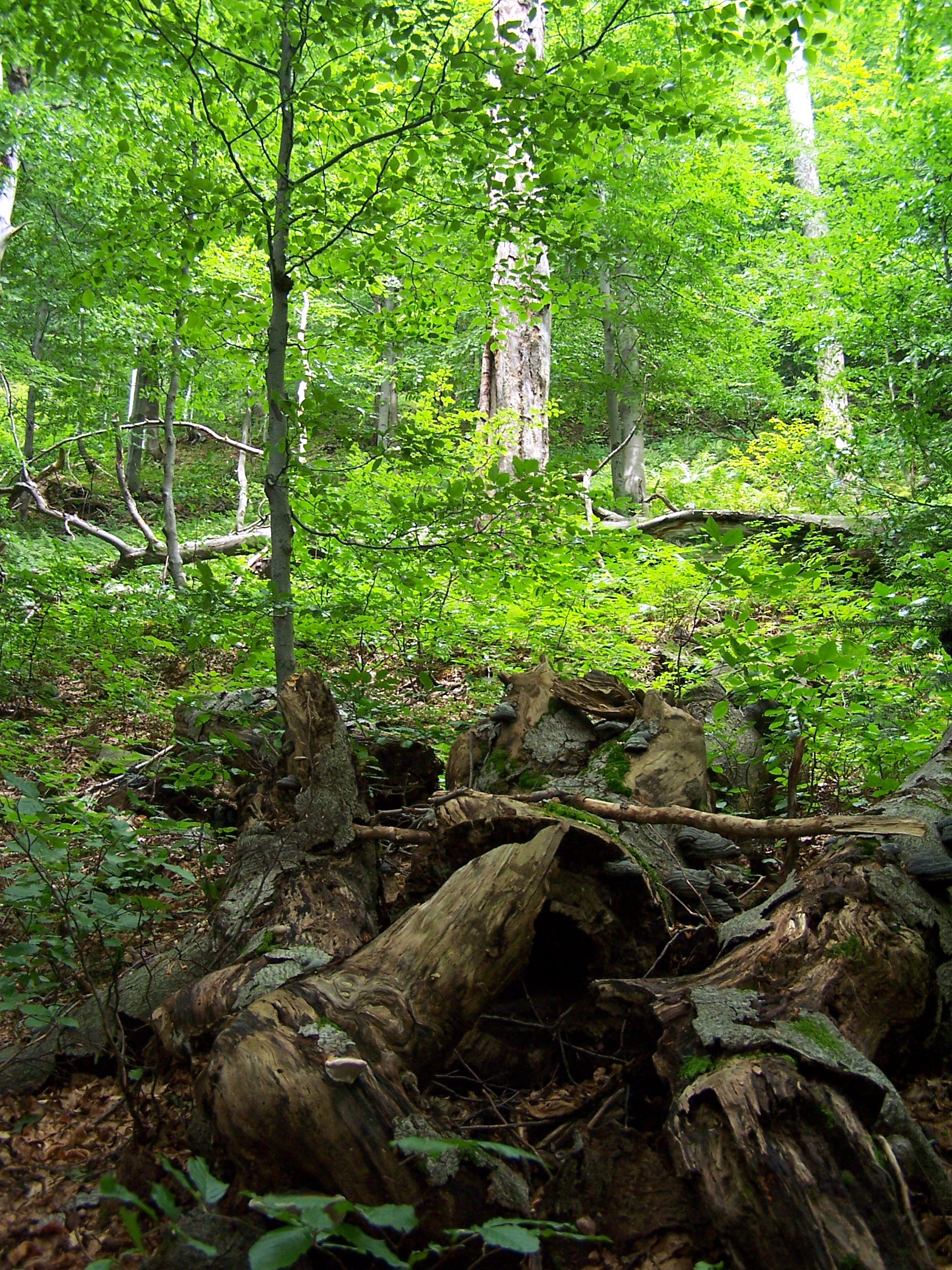
Forest in Stuzica

The primeval beech forests of Havešová, Stužica, and Rožok (all three areas being in the Bukovské vrchy) were designated as a World Heritage Site by UNESCO on 28 June 2007 because of their comprehensive and undisturbed ecological patterns and processes. Together with another Slovak site in Vihorlat and an additional six in Ukraine, they form Primeval Beech Forests of the Carpathians. In order to protect the extraordinary value of these forests, only one of them, Stužica, is accessible to the public.

== See also ==
- Protected areas of Slovakia
- Carpathian Wooden Churches
- Stužica

== Gallery ==
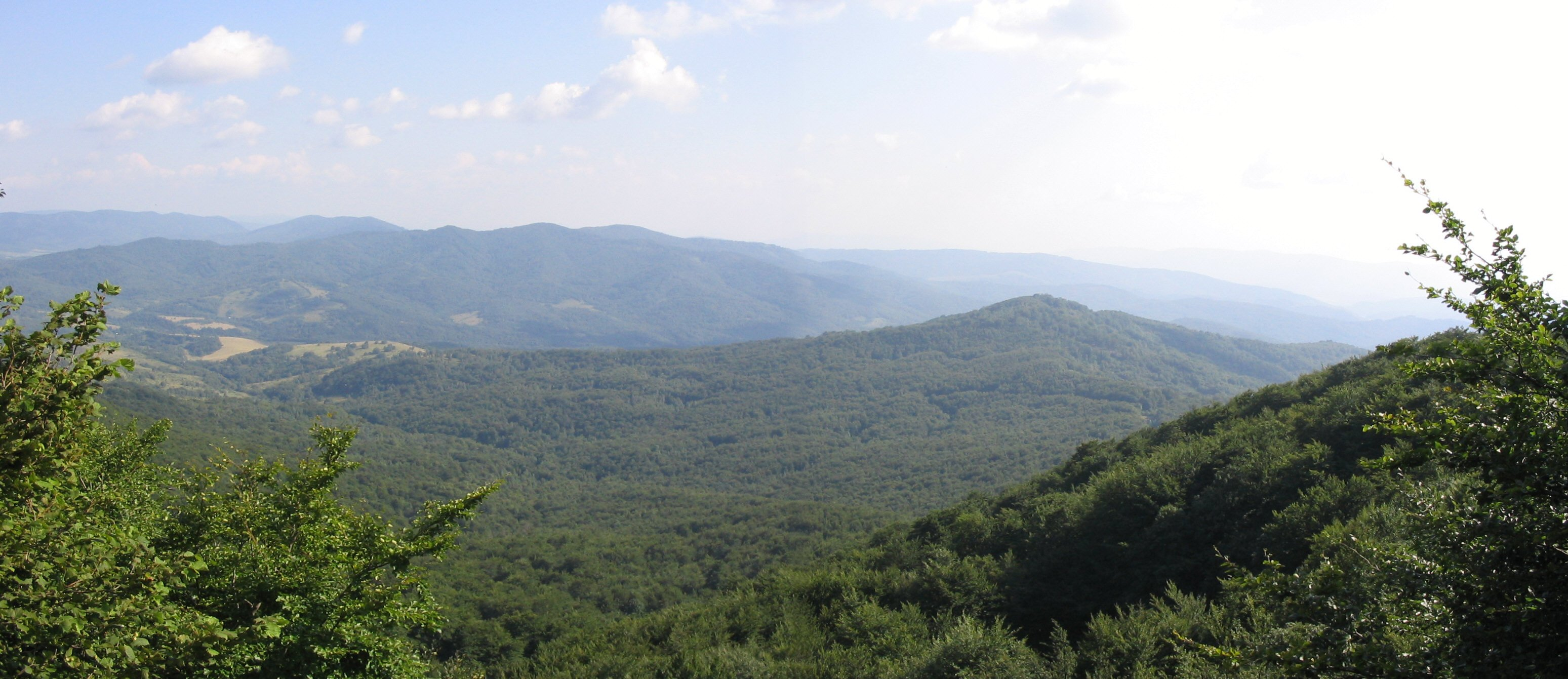
Panoramic view at the Poloniny mountains.

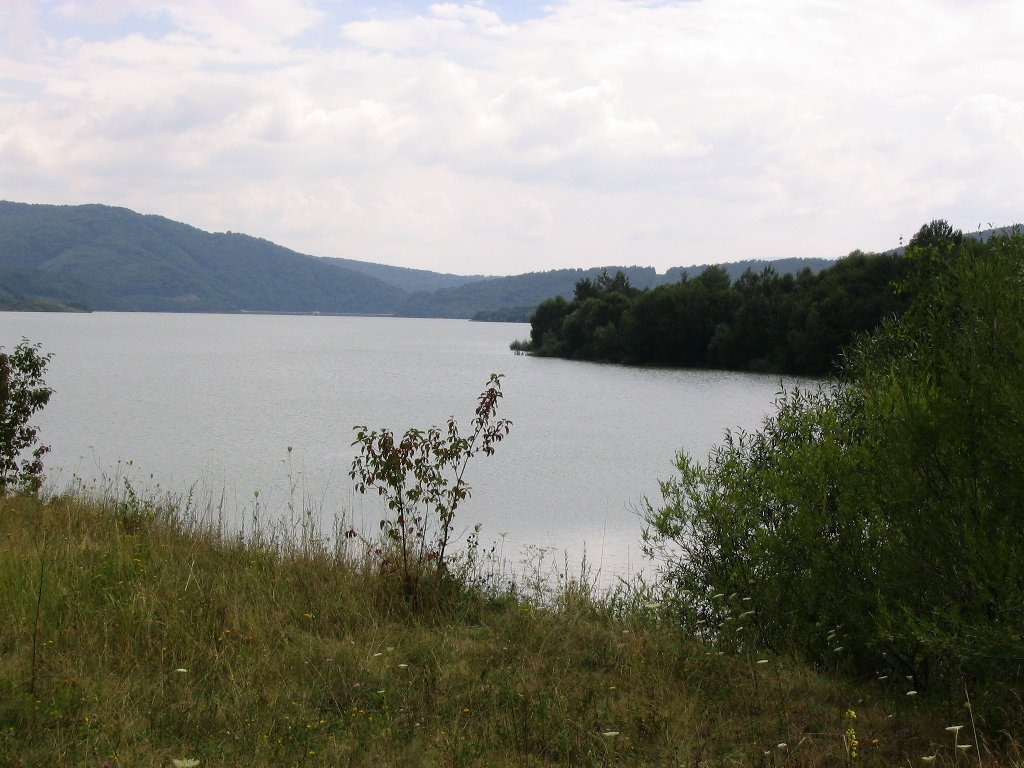
Water reservoir Starina.

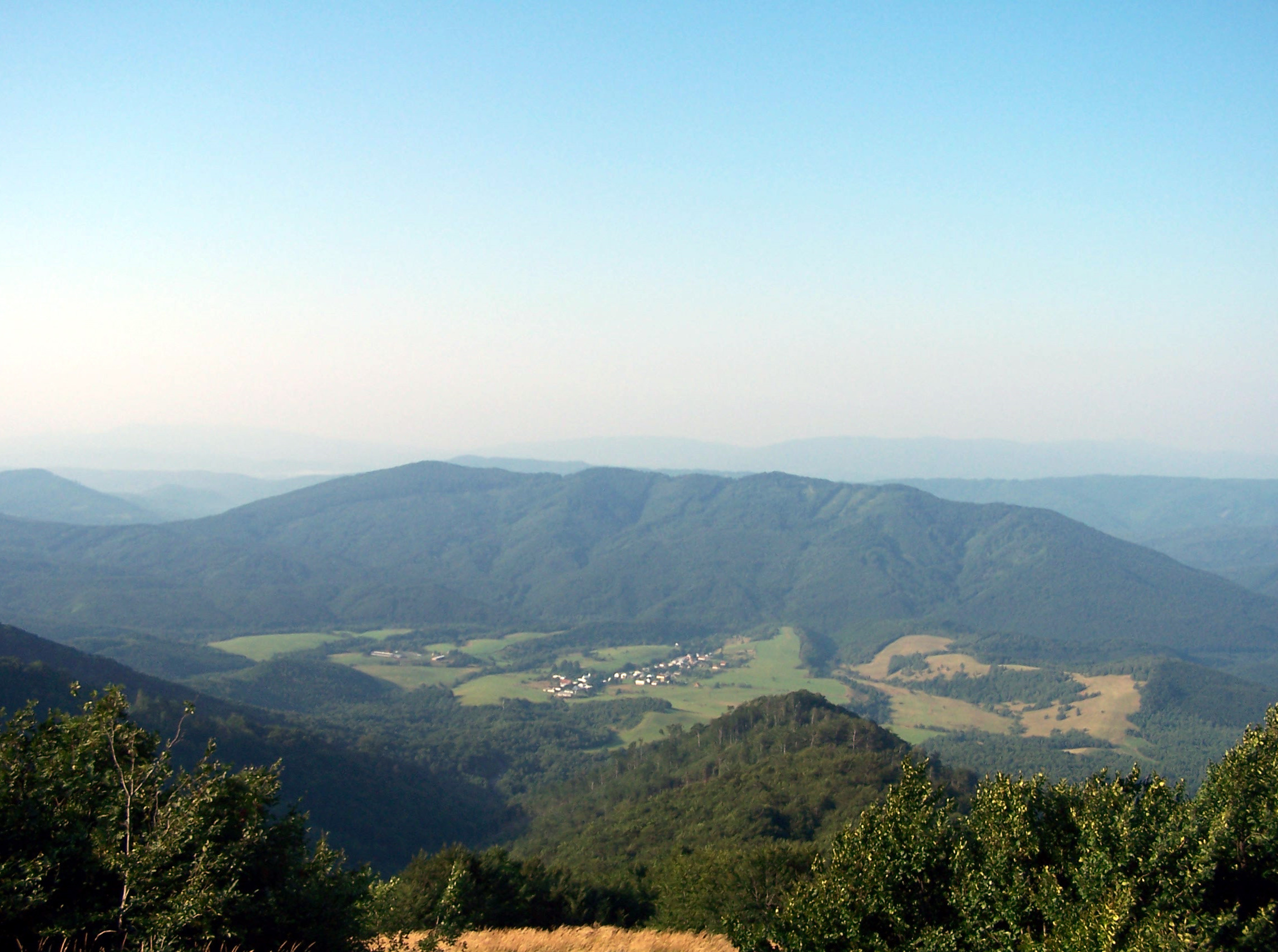
Runina village from Saddle under Durkovec.

Hiking trail in the National Park.

View of the Bukovské vrchy mountain range.

Wooden church in Ruský Potok.

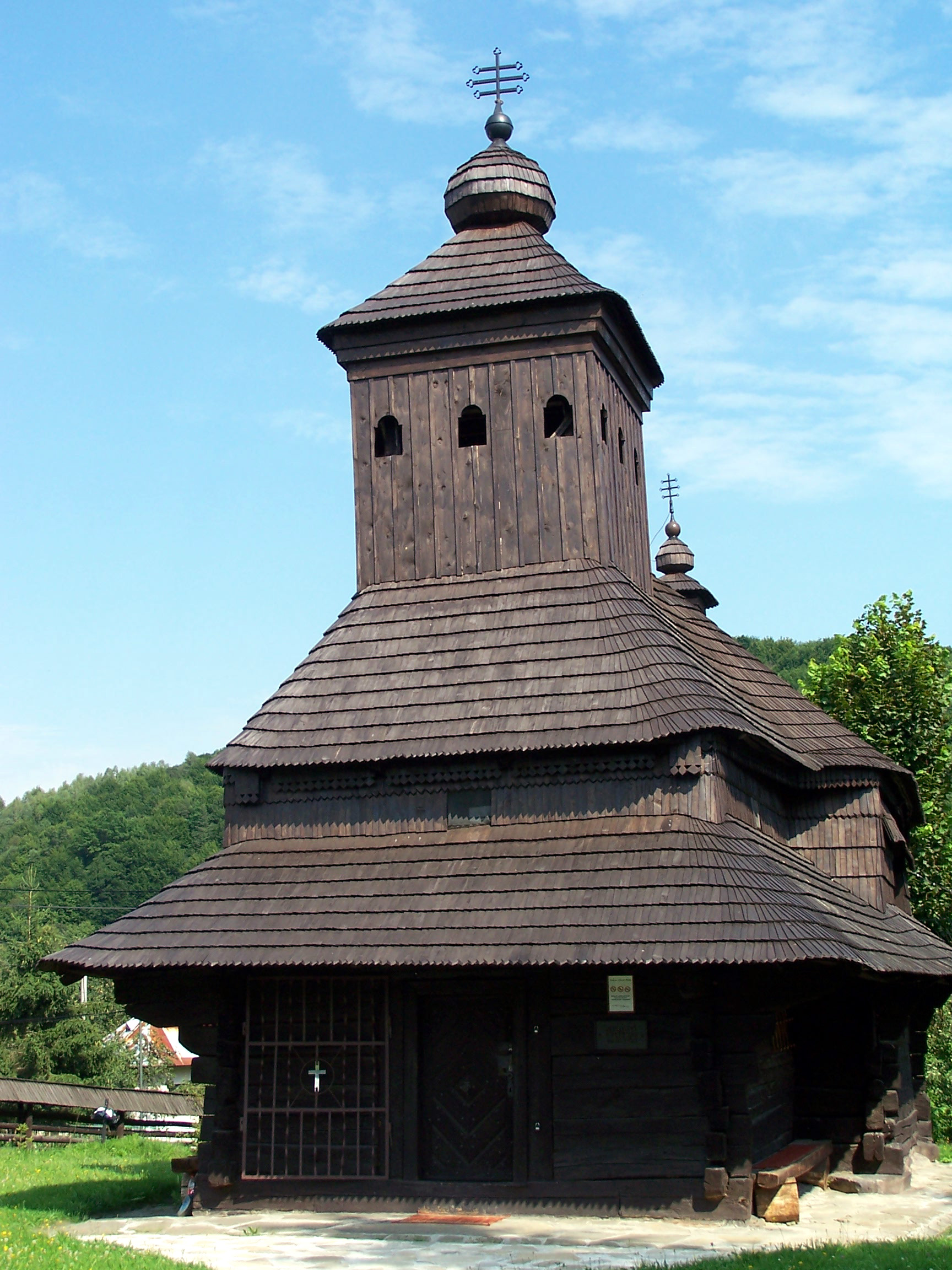
Wooden church in Uličské Krivé.
