= Runina =

- Municipality
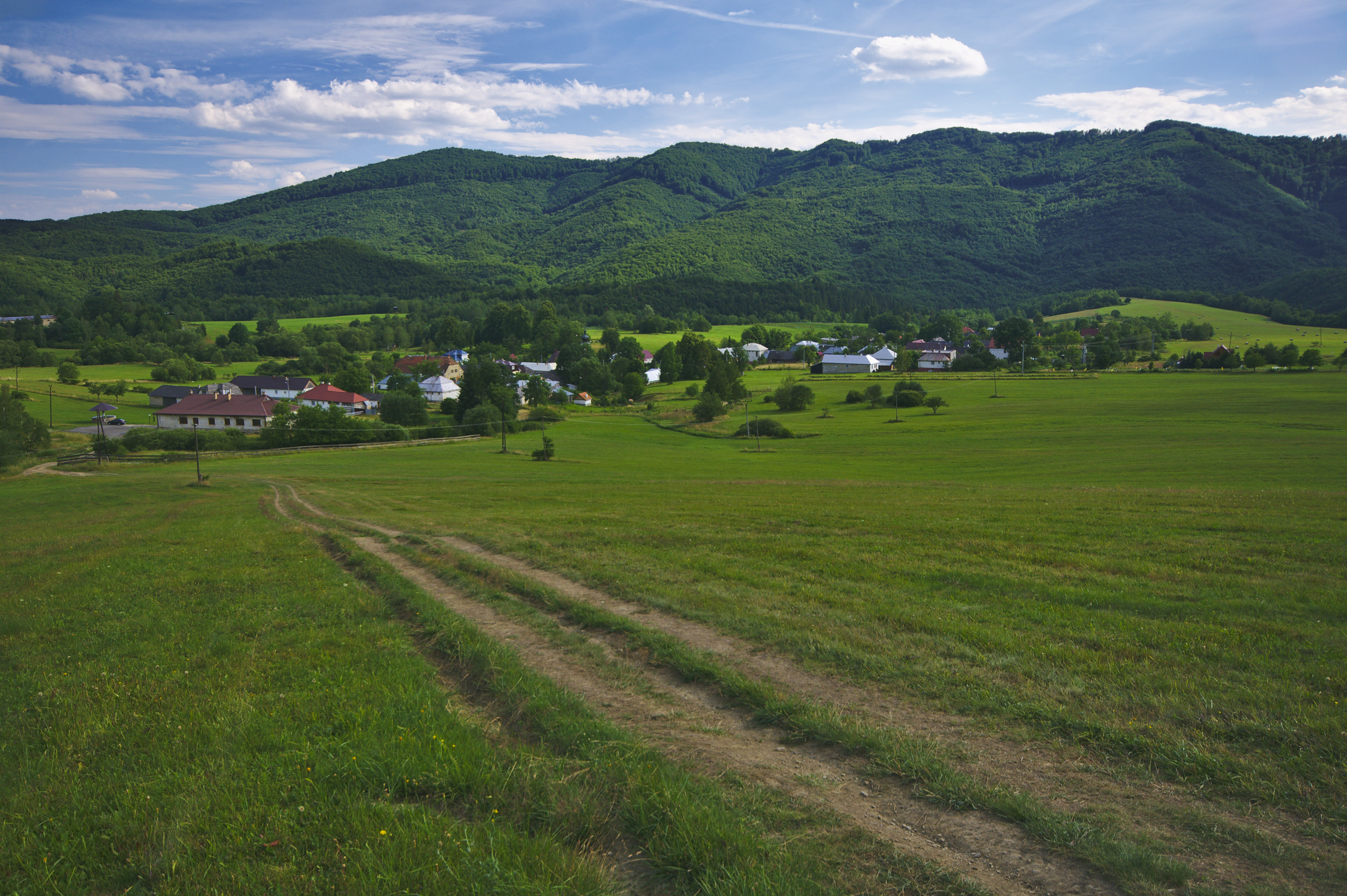

- Flag

- Location of Runina in the Prešov Region Location of Runina in Slovakia
- Coordinates: 49.07°N 22.40°E
- Country: Slovakia
- Region: Prešov Region
- District: Snina District
- First mentioned: 1569

Government
  - Mayor: Marián Regula (SMER-SD)

Area
  - Total: 22.21 km^{2} (8.58 sq mi)
- Elevation: 537 m (1,762 ft)

Population (2025)
  - Total: 71
- Time zone: UTC+1 (CET)
  - Summer (DST): UTC+2 (CEST)
- Postal code: 676 5
- Area code: +421 57
- Vehicle registration plate (until 2022): SV
- Website: www.runina.sk

Runina (Hungarian: Juhászlak, Rusyn: Руніна) is a village and municipality in Snina District in the Prešov Region of north-eastern Slovakia. The first written reference of the village dates back to 1569. The municipality lies at an altitude of 550 metres and covers an area of 22.198 km^{2}. According to the 2013 census it had a population of 75 inhabitants.

The village situated in the buffer zone of the Poloniny National Park offers easy access to most of the National Park's hiking trails. Stužica, a component of the Primeval Beech Forests of the Carpathians UNESCO World Heritage Site is also close to the village.

== Geography ==
The municipality lies at an altitude of 537 metres (1,762 ft) and covers an area of 22.21 km^{2} (8.58 sq mi) (2025).

== History ==
Before the establishment of independent Czechoslovakia in 1918, Runina was part of Zemplén County within the Kingdom of Hungary. In 1939, it was for a short time part of the Slovak Republic. From 1939 to 1944, as a result of the Slovak–Hungarian War of 1939, it was again part of Hungary. In 1944, the Red Army entered Runina and it was once again part of Czechoslovakia.

== Population ==
Population statistic (10 years)
Year	1995	2005	2015	2025
Count	117	66	80	71
Difference		−43.58%	+21.21%	−11.25%

Population statistic
Year	2024	2025
Count	69	71
Difference		+2.89%

It has a population of 71 people (31 December 2025).

=== Ethnicity ===
Census 2021 (1+ %)
Ethnicity	Number	Fraction
Rusyn	65	84.41%
Slovak	25	32.46%
Ukrainian	6	7.79%
German	1	1.29%
Total	77	

In year 2021 was 77 people by ethnicity 65 as Rusyn, 25 as Slovak, 6 as Ukrainian and 1 as German.

Note on population: The difference values of population numbers in the table "Population statistic" and in the sections "Ethnicity" & "Religion" is caused by the use of various statistical methods.

=== Religion ===
Census 2021 (1+ %)
Religion	Number	Fraction
Eastern Orthodox Church	63	81.82%
None	6	7.79%
Roman Catholic Church	5	6.49%
Greek Catholic Church	3	3.9%
Total	77	

In year 2021 was 77 people by religion 63 from Eastern Orthodox Church, 6 from None, 5 from Roman Catholic Church and 3 from Greek Catholic Church.
