= Bukovec Mountains =

Mountain range in Slovakia

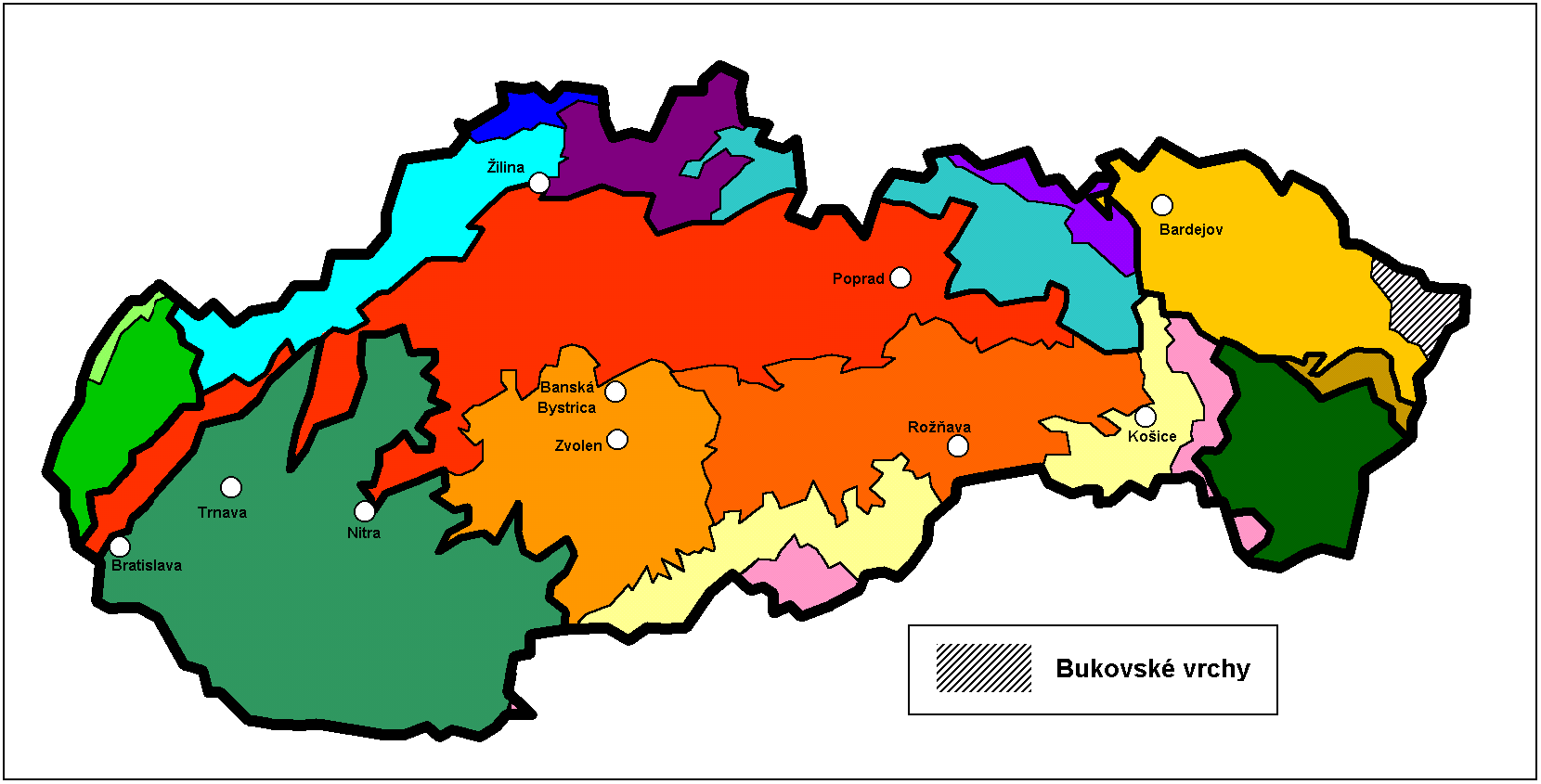

Highest point
- Peak: Kremenec
- Elevation: 1,221 m (4,006 ft)
- Listing: Mountains of Slovakia

Naming
- Native name: Bukovské vrchy (Slovak)

Geography
- Country: Slovakia
- Region: Prešov
- Range coordinates: 49°04′N 22°26′E
- Borders on: Low Beskids

The Bukovec Mountains (Slovak: Bukovské vrchy; Hungarian: Ungi-határhegység) is a flysch mountain range in north-eastern Slovakia, part of the Eastern Beskids of the Outer Eastern Carpathians.

It is located in the Prešov Region near the borders with Poland (Bieszczady Mountains) and Ukraine, and adjacent to the Laborec Highlands. The highest mountain is Kremenec at 1,221 m AMSL.

Original flora and fauna was preserved because of the area's remoteness. The mountain range is covered with beech forests. The area is protected by Poloniny National Park. Localities Havešová, Stužica and Rožok are listed on the UNESCO World Heritage Site list.
