= Uličské Krivé =

- Municipality
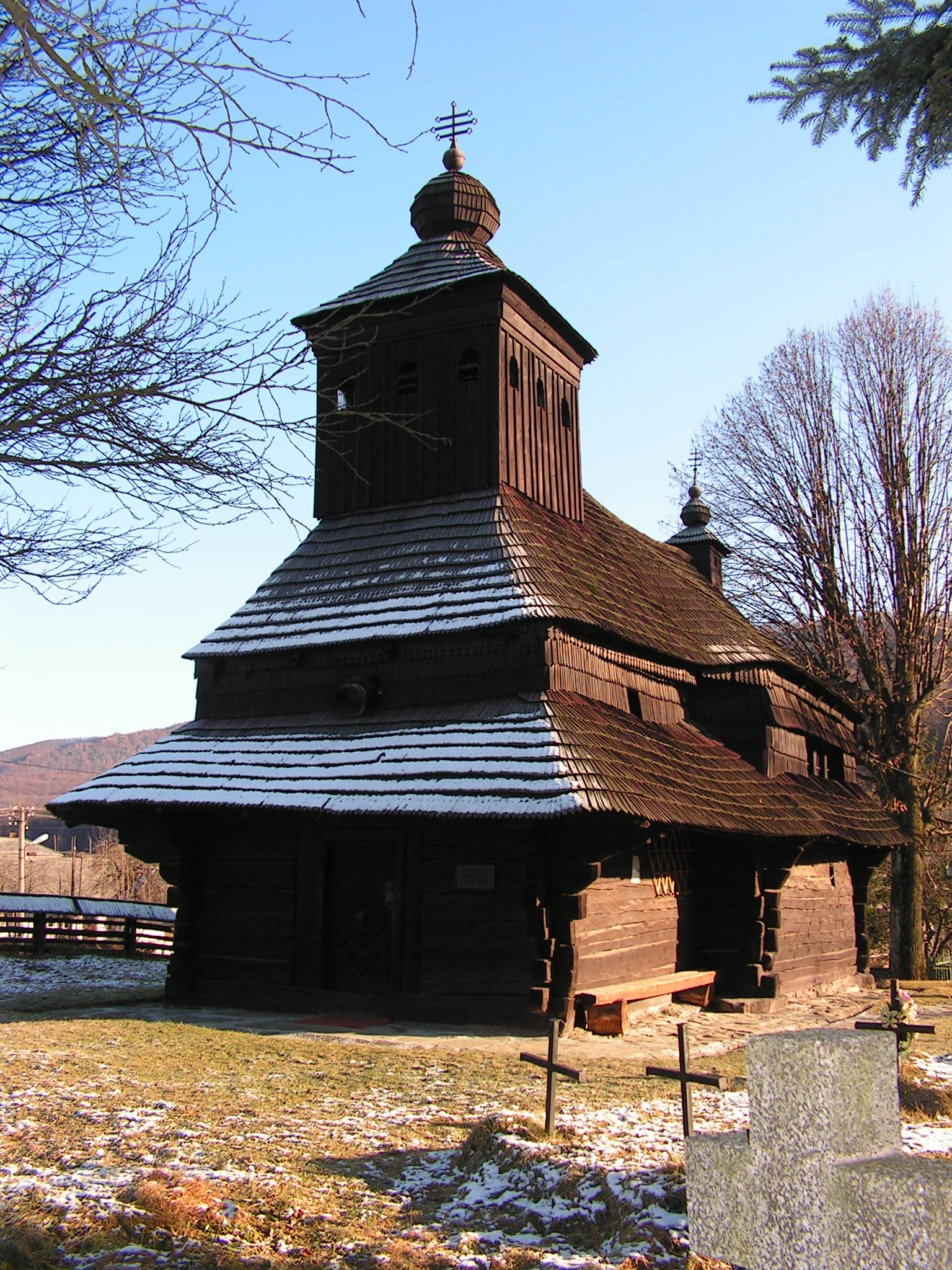
- Wooden church (cerkva) in Uličské Krivé

- Flag

- Location of Uličské Krivé in the Prešov Region Location of Uličské Krivé in Slovakia
- Coordinates: 48.99°N 22.44°E
- Country: Slovakia
- Region: Prešov Region
- District: Snina District
- First mentioned: 1478

Area
  - Total: 19.13 km^{2} (7.39 sq mi)
- Elevation: 278 m (912 ft)

Population (2025)
  - Total: 225
- Time zone: UTC+1 (CET)
  - Summer (DST): UTC+2 (CEST)
- Postal code: 677 3
- Area code: +421 57
- Vehicle registration plate (until 2022): SV
- Website: www.ulicskekrive.sk

Uličské Krivé (Hungarian: Görbeszeg, Rusyn: Уліцьке Криве) is a village and municipality in Snina District in the Prešov Region of north-eastern Slovakia. In historical records the village was first mentioned in 1478. The municipality lies at an altitude of 285 metres and covers an area of 19.132 km^{2}. According to the 2013 census it had a population of 255 inhabitants.

The village is situated in the buffer zone of the Poloniny National Park and offers an access point to some of the National Park's hiking trails. Several components of the Primeval Beech Forests of the Carpathians UNESCO World Heritage Site are also close to the village.

The wooden Greek Catholic church in the village dates back to 1718 and is dedicated to the Archangel Michael.

== Geography ==
The municipality lies at an altitude of 278 metres (912 ft) and covers an area of 19.13 km^{2} (7.39 sq mi) (2025).

== History ==
Before the establishment of independent Czechoslovakia in 1918, Uličské Krivé was part of Zemplén County within the Kingdom of Hungary. In 1939, it was for a short time part of the Slovak Republic. From 1939 to 1944, as a result of the Slovak–Hungarian War of 1939, it was again part of Hungary. On 26 October 1944, the Red Army entered Uličské Krivé and it was once again part of Czechoslovakia.

== Population ==
Population statistic (10 years)
| Year | 1995 | 2005 | 2015 | 2025 |
|---|---|---|---|---|
| Count | 317 | 275 | 260 | 225 |
| Difference | | −13.24% | −5.45% | −13.46% |

Population statistic
| Year | 2024 | 2025 |
|---|---|---|
| Count | 225 | 225 |
| Difference | | +0% |

It has a population of 225 people (31 December 2025).

=== Ethnicity ===
Census 2021 (1+ %)
| Ethnicity | Number | Fraction |
|---|---|---|
| Slovak | 194 | 79.18% |
| Rusyn | 148 | 60.4% |
| Not found out | 8 | 3.26% |
| Total | 245 | |

In year 2021 was 245 people by ethnicity 194 as Slovak, 148 as Rusyn, 8 as Not found out, 2 as Ukrainian and 1 as Czech.

Note on population: The difference values of population numbers in the table "Population statistic" and in the sections "Ethnicity" & "Religion" is caused by the use of various statistical methods.

=== Religion ===
Census 2021 (1+ %)
| Religion | Number | Fraction |
|---|---|---|
| Greek Catholic Church | 148 | 60.41% |
| Eastern Orthodox Church | 65 | 26.53% |
| None | 11 | 4.49% |
| Roman Catholic Church | 10 | 4.08% |
| Not found out | 10 | 4.08% |
| Total | 245 | |

In year 2021 was 245 people by religion 148 from Greek Catholic Church, 65 from Eastern Orthodox Church, 11 from None, 10 from Roman Catholic Church, 10 from Not found out and 1 from Other.
