= Ruský Potok =

- Municipality
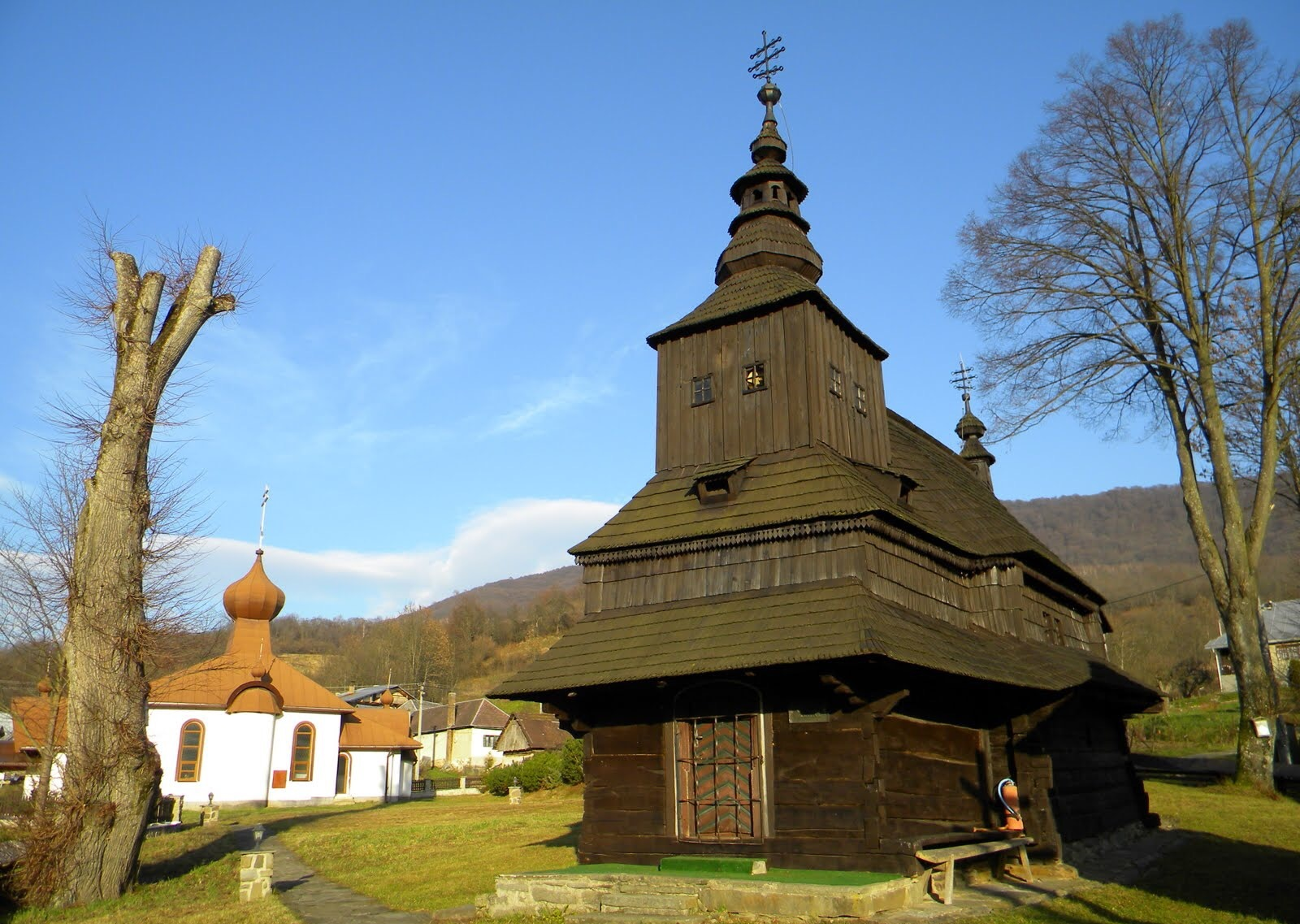
- Wooden church in Ruský Potok

- Flag

- Location of Ruský Potok in the Prešov Region Location of Ruský Potok in Slovakia
- Coordinates: 49.03°N 22.43°E
- Country: Slovakia
- Region: Prešov Region
- District: Snina District
- First mentioned: 1635

Area
  - Total: 12.90 km^{2} (4.98 sq mi)
- Elevation: 428 m (1,404 ft)

Population (2025)
  - Total: 104
- Time zone: UTC+1 (CET)
  - Summer (DST): UTC+2 (CEST)
- Postal code: 676 6
- Area code: +421 57
- Vehicle registration plate (until 2022): SV
- Website: www.obecruskypotok.sk

Ruský Potok (Hungarian: Oroszpatak, Rusyn: Руськый Потік) is a village and municipality in Snina District in the Prešov Region of north-eastern Slovakia. In historical records the village was first mentioned in 1635. A Rusyn wooden Orthodox church dedicated to the Archangel Michael is located in the village, it was built in 1740.

The municipality lies at an altitude of 440 metres and covers an area of 12.885 km^{2}. According to the 2013 census it had a population of 133 inhabitants. Situated in the buffer zone of the Poloniny National Park it offers good access to some of the National Park's hiking trails. Several components of the Primeval Beech Forests of the Carpathians UNESCO World Heritage Site are also close to the village.

== History ==
Before the establishment of independent Czechoslovakia in 1918, Ruský Potok was part of Zemplén County within the Kingdom of Hungary. In 1939, it was for a short time part of the Slovak Republic. As a result of the Slovak–Hungarian War of 1939, it was from 1939 to 1944 again part of Hungary. In the autumn of 1944, the Red Army entered Ruský Potok and it was once again part of Czechoslovakia.

== Geography ==
The municipality lies at an altitude of 428 metres (1,404 ft) and covers an area of 12.90 km^{2} (4.98 sq mi) (2025).

== Population ==
Population statistic (10 years)
Year	1995	2005	2015	2025
Count	183	147	138	104
Difference		−19.67%	−6.12%	−24.63%

Population statistic
Year	2024	2025
Count	111	104
Difference		−6.30%

It has a population of 104 people (31 December 2025).

=== Ethnicity ===
Census 2021 (1+ %)
Ethnicity	Number	Fraction
Slovak	90	69.76%
Rusyn	80	62.01%
Not found out	5	3.87%
Total	129	

In year 2021 was 129 people by ethnicity 90 as Slovak, 80 as Rusyn, 5 as Not found out and 1 as Polish.

Note on population: The difference values of population numbers in the table "Population statistic" and in the sections "Ethnicity" & "Religion" is caused by the use of various statistical methods.

=== Religion ===
Census 2021 (1+ %)
Religion	Number	Fraction
Eastern Orthodox Church	118	91.47%
None	5	3.88%
Not found out	3	2.33%
Total	129	

In year 2021 was 129 people by religion 118 from Eastern Orthodox Church, 5 from None, 3 from Not found out, 1 from Roman Catholic Church, 1 from Greek Catholic Church and 1 from Evangelical Church.

== See also ==
- Rava-Ruska
