= Nová Sedlica =

- Municipality
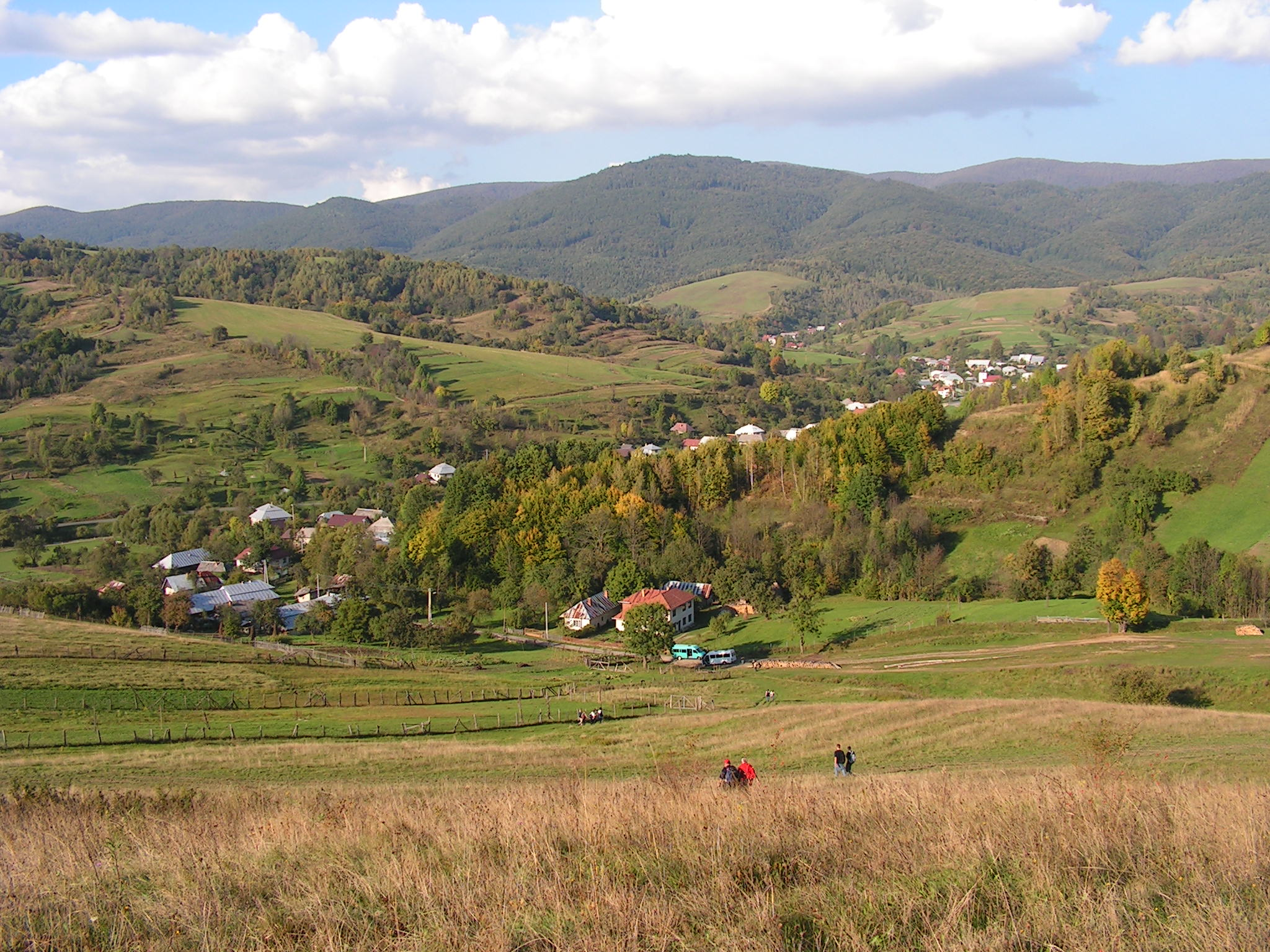

- Flag

- Location of Nová Sedlica in the Prešov Region Location of Nová Sedlica in Slovakia
- Coordinates: 49.08°N 22.57°E
- Country: Slovakia
- Region: Prešov Region
- District: Snina District
- First mentioned: 1630

Area
  - Total: 33.02 km^{2} (12.75 sq mi)
- Elevation: 389 m (1,276 ft)

Population (2025)
  - Total: 231
- Time zone: UTC+1 (CET)
  - Summer (DST): UTC+2 (CEST)
- Postal code: 676 8
- Area code: +421 57
- Vehicle registration plate (until 2022): SV

Nová Sedlica (Hungarian: Újszék; Rusyn: Новоселіця, Novosedlitsia; Ukrainian: Нова Седлиця, Nova sedlytsia) is the easternmost village and municipality in Slovakia (the easternmost point is the Mt. Kremenec, the tripoint Slovakia-Ukraine-Poland is located at its summit), in Snina District in the Prešov Region.

The village, situated in the buffer zone of the Poloniny National Park, offers easy access to most of the National Park's hiking trails. Stužica, a component of the Primeval Beech Forests of the Carpathians UNESCO World Heritage Site is also close to the village.

The municipality lies at an altitude of 421 metres and covers an area of 32.806 km². According to the 2013 census it had 293 inhabitants. The closest town is Snina, 43 km away.

== Geography ==
The municipality lies at an altitude of 389 metres (1,276 ft) and covers an area of 33.02 km^{2} (12.75 sq mi) (2025).

== History ==
In historical records the village was first mentioned in 1630. Before the establishment of independent Czechoslovakia in 1918, Nová Sedlica was part of Zemplén County within the Kingdom of Hungary. In 1939, it was for a short time part of the Slovak Republic. From 1939 to 1944, as a result of the Slovak–Hungarian War of 1939, it was again part of Hungary. On 16 October 1944, the Red Army entered Nová Sedlica and it was once again part of Czechoslovakia.

== Population ==
Population statistic (10 years)
Year	1995	2005	2015	2025
Count	365	322	289	231
Difference		−11.78%	−10.24%	−20.06%

Population statistic
Year	2024	2025
Count	231	231
Difference		+0%

It has a population of 231 people (31 December 2025).

=== Ethnicity ===
Census 2021 (1+ %)
Ethnicity	Number	Fraction
Slovak	216	86.05%
Rusyn	172	68.52%
Not found out	4	1.59%
Ukrainian	3	1.19%
Total	251	

In year 2021 was 251 people by ethnicity 216 as Slovak, 172 as Rusyn, 4 as Not found out, 3 as Ukrainian, 2 as Czech, 1 as Romani and 1 as German.

Note on population: The difference values of population numbers in the table "Population statistic" and in the sections "Ethnicity" & "Religion" is caused by the use of various statistical methods.

=== Religion ===
Census 2021 (1+ %)
Religion	Number	Fraction
Eastern Orthodox Church	190	75.7%
None	25	9.96%
Greek Catholic Church	15	5.98%
Jehovah's Witnesses	11	4.38%
Roman Catholic Church	6	2.39%
Not found out	4	1.59%
Total	251	

In year 2021 was 251 people by religion 190 from Eastern Orthodox Church, 25 from None, 15 from Greek Catholic Church, 11 from Jehovah's Witnesses, 6 from Roman Catholic Church and 4 from Not found out.
