= Stužica =

National nature reserve in Slovakia

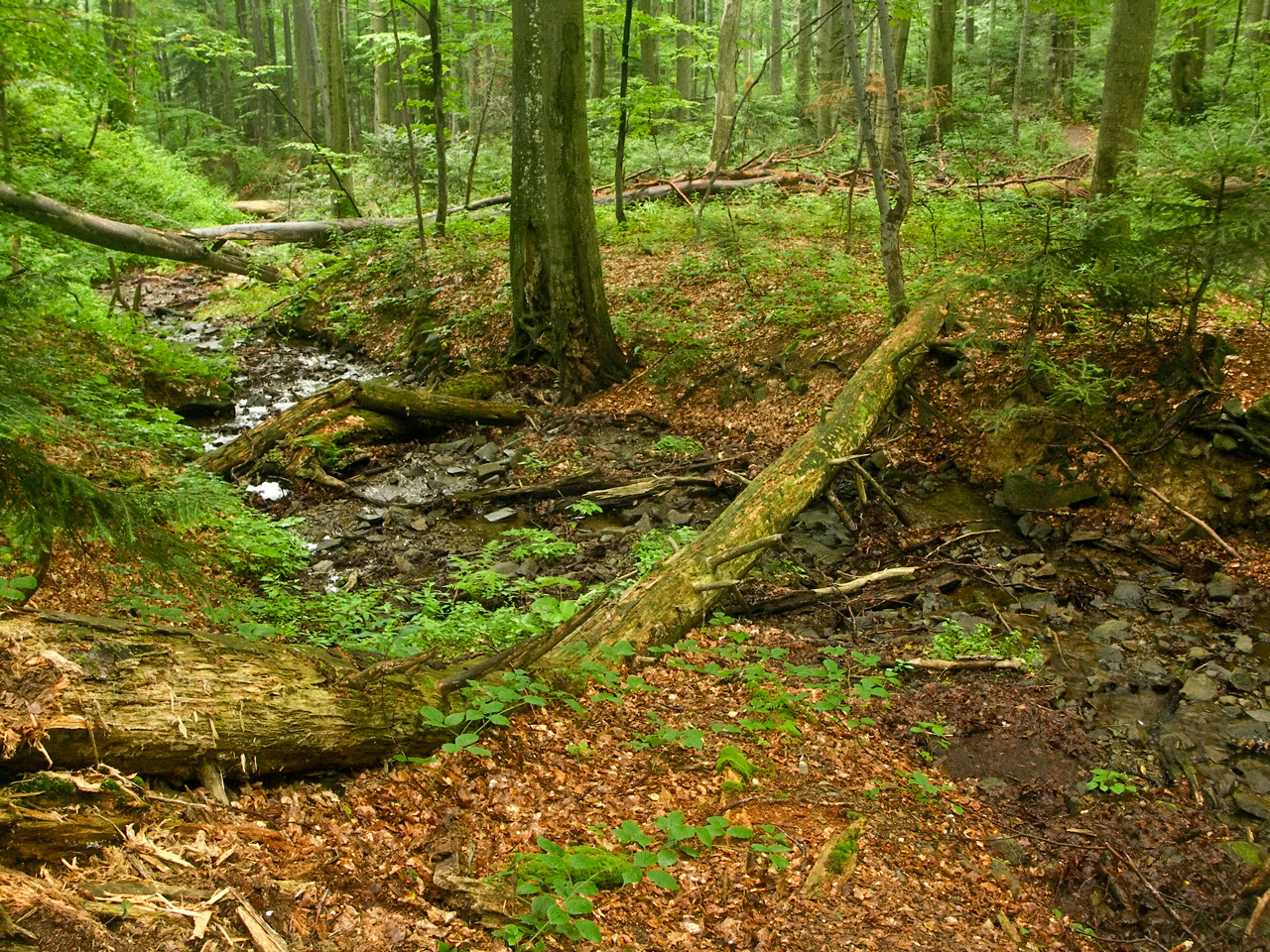

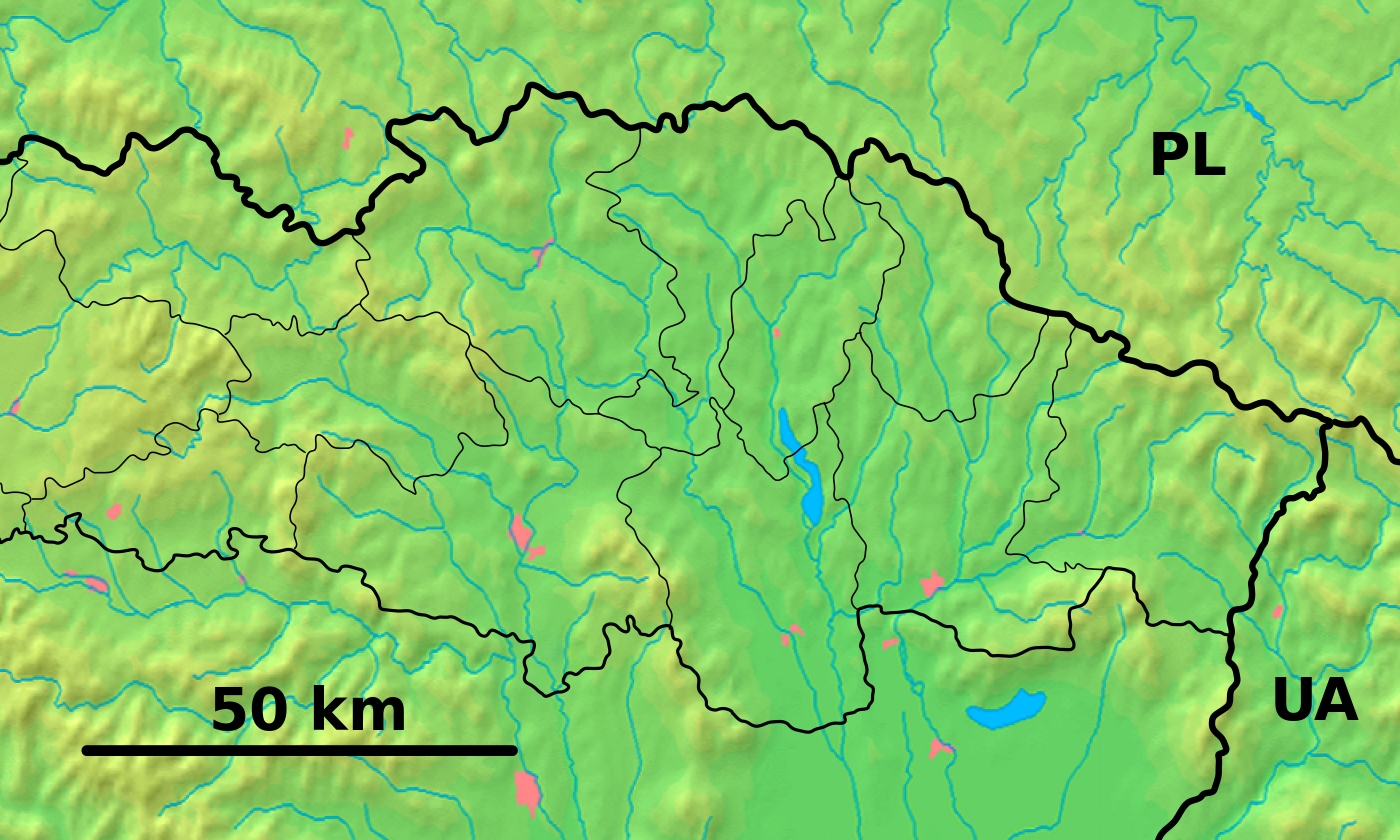
- Location within Eastern Prešov Region Location within Slovakia
- Location: Near Nová Sedlica, Snina District, Prešov, Slovakia
- Coordinates: 49°05′N 22°32′E
- Area: 761.49 ha (1,881.7 acres)
- Established: 1908

Stužica is a uniquely preserved and undisturbed primeval beech forest of the Outer Eastern Carpathians. It is located in Slovakia and borders with Poland and Ukraine. The forest has been protected since 1908 and in 1993 the area was upgraded to a National Nature Reserve. In 2007 Stužica and several other locations in the range, including six components in Ukraine, were declared as a UNESCO World Heritage Site. Five German components were added in 2011. Together they form Primeval Beech Forests of the Carpathians and the Ancient Beech Forests of Germany WH site with outstanding universal value.

== Gallery ==
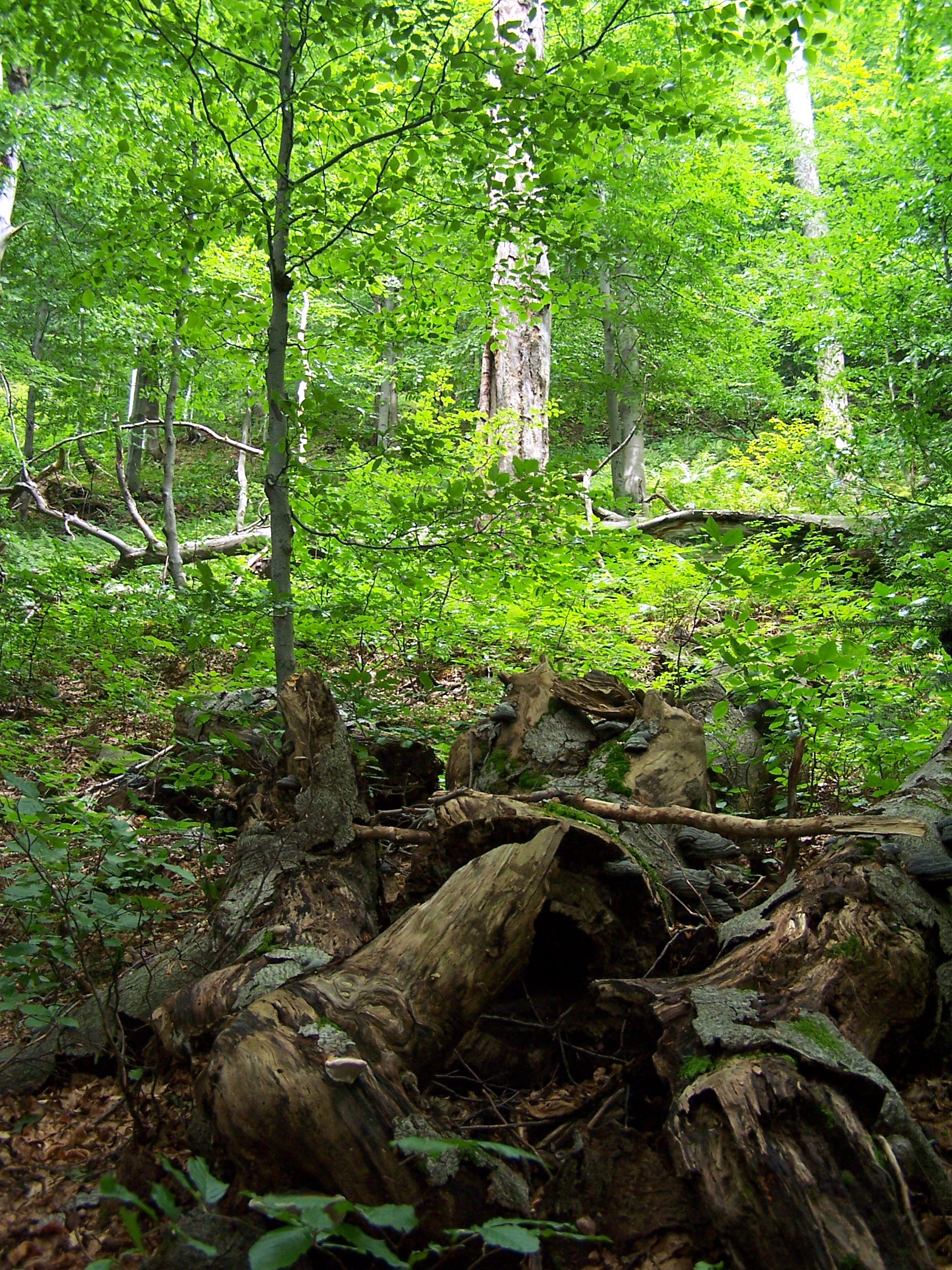
Forest in Stužica

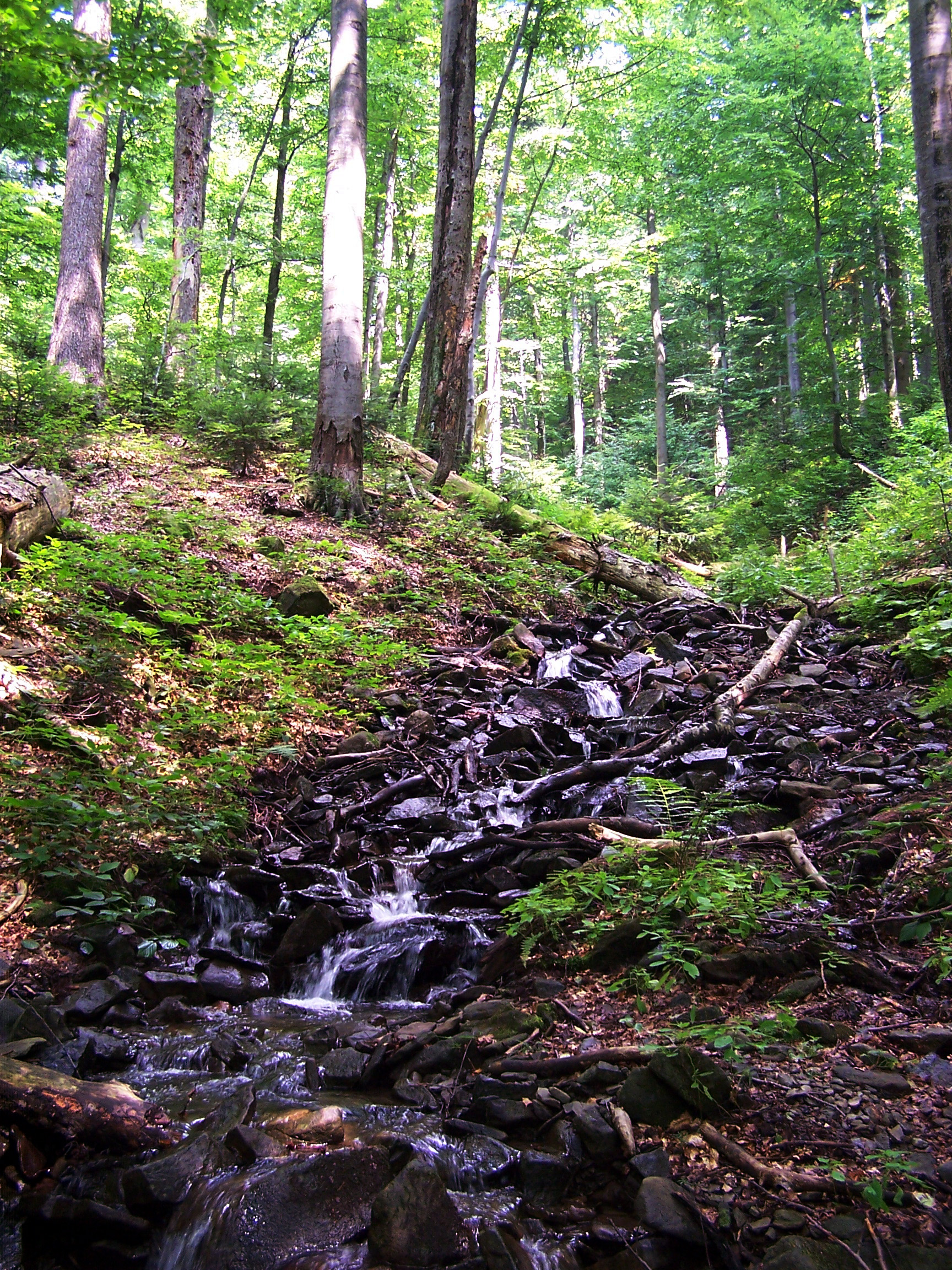
Stream in Stužica

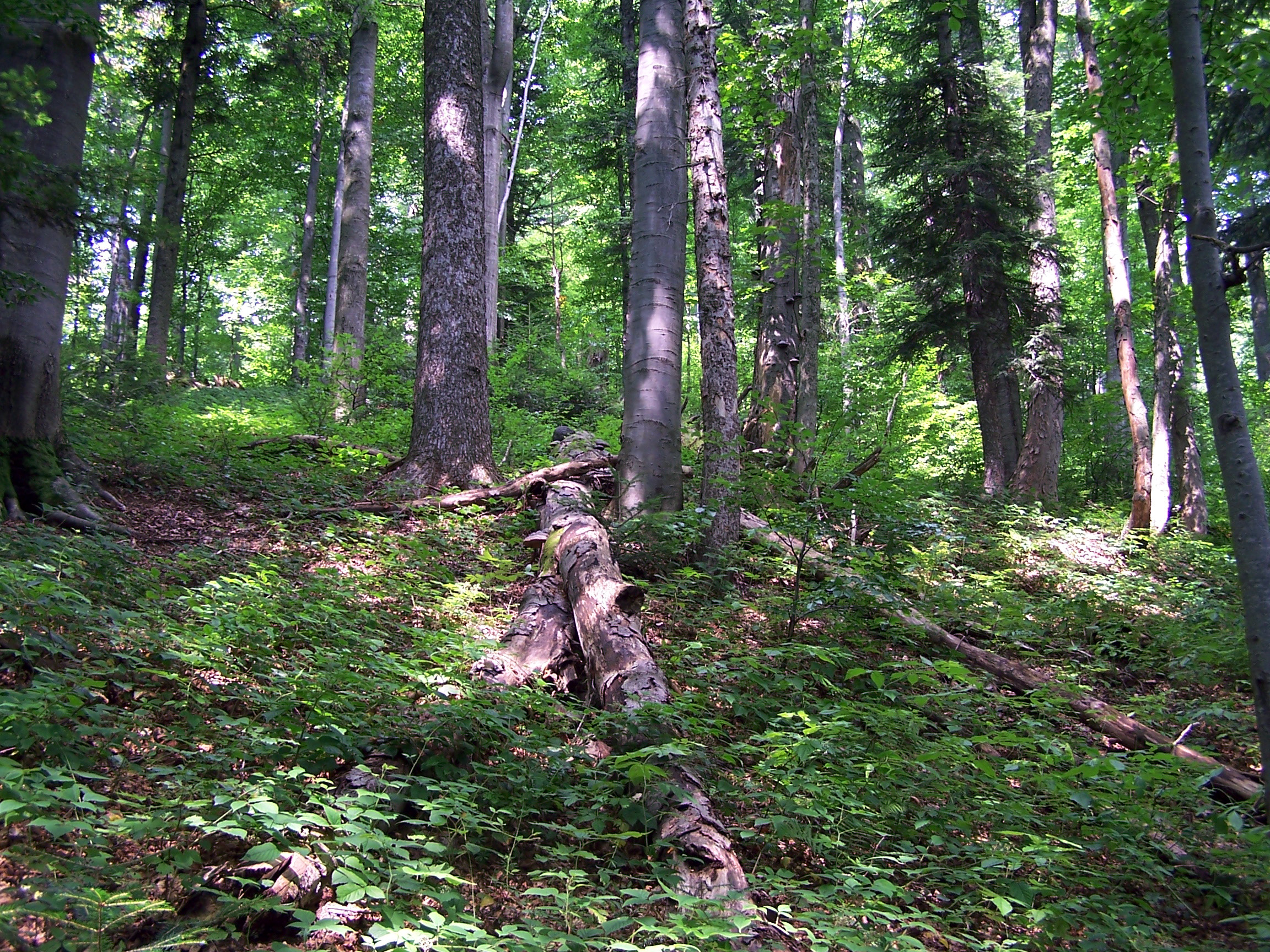
Stužica

== Resources ==
- "National nature reserve Stužica". State Inventory of Specially Protected Parts of Nature and Landscape.
- "Primeval Beech Forests of the Carpathians and the Ancient Beech Forests of Germany". UNESCO World Heritage Centre.
