= Nevytske Castle =

Ruined castle in Ukraine

Coordinates: 48°40′51″N 22°24′33″E

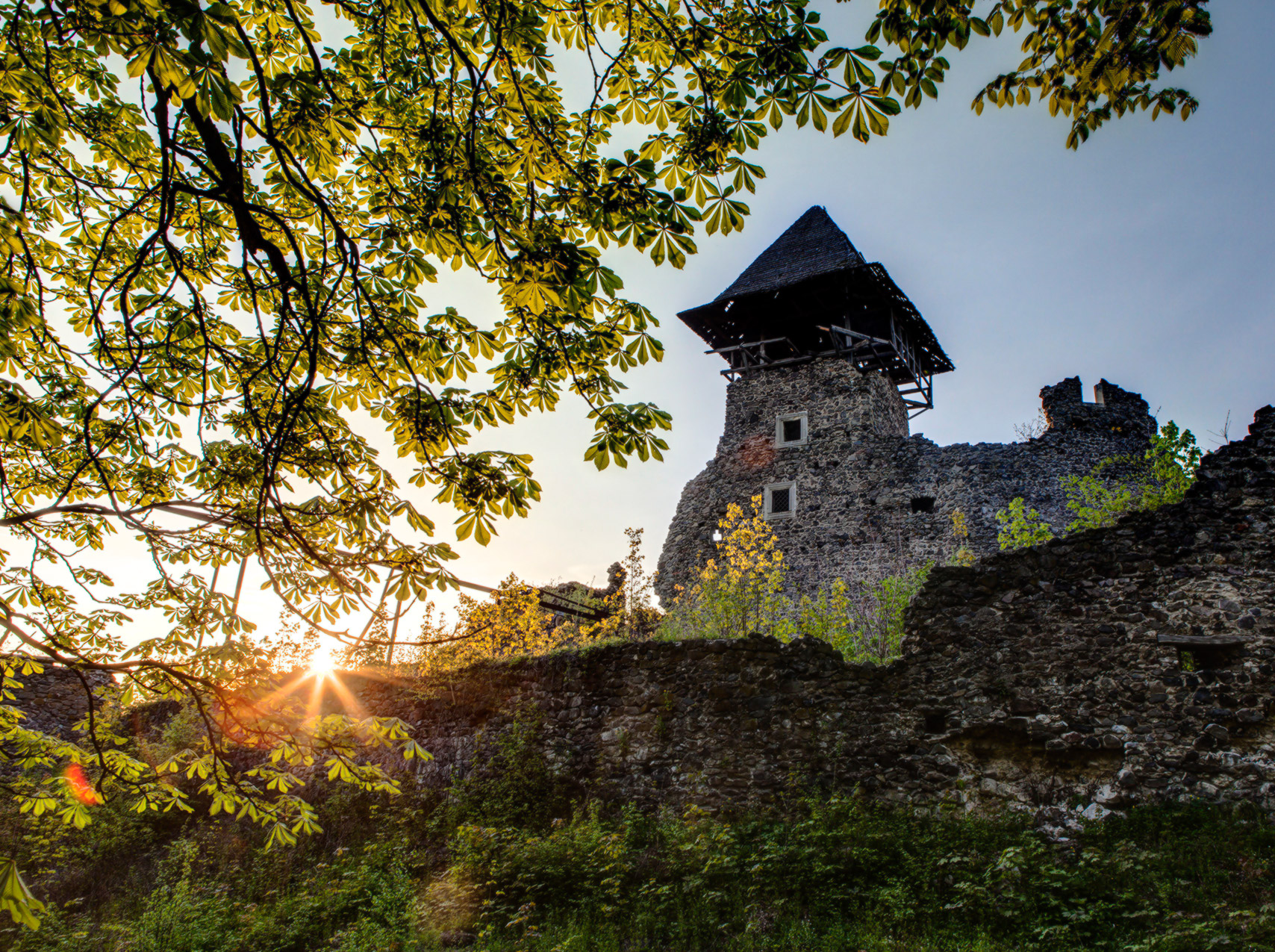
Nevytske Castle

The Nevytske Castle (Ukrainian: Невицький замок, romanized: Nevyts'kyi zamok; Hungarian: Nevickei vár) is a semi-ruined castle in Zakarpattia Oblast, Ukraine.

It is located 12 kilometres (7.5 mi) north of Uzhhorod near the villages Nevytske and Kamianytsia, Uzhhorod Raion along the H 13. The castle is located in the woods on a hill of volcanic origin with a relative elevation of 122 metres (400 ft) and a few hundred meters to the east of a road and river that flows along. This location of the castle gave it a good opportunity to control the Transcarpathian route over the Uzhok pass (Bieszczady Mountains).

The castle was first mentioned in 1274 belonging to the King of Hungary Laszlo IV as a donjon (keep). Completely rebuilt in the early 15th century, the castle, towering over the Uzh River, was the mighty citadel of the Drugeth family which supervised its continuous modernisation over the centuries. The keep, rebuilt in its present form in the early 16th century, passed from hand to hand during the internecine strife that convulsed Hungary in the early 17th century.

In 1644, Prince of Transylvania George II Rákóczi ruined the castle, leaving it much as it stands today. A decline in defensive importance of the site as well as the remote and inaccessible situation of the castle have preserved it from complete demolition.

Near the site is located an Uzhhorod Military Training Center.

Parts of the castle (the roof of the donjon, the keep) collapsed in March 2019. Early 2021 Nevytske Castle was partly reconstructed.

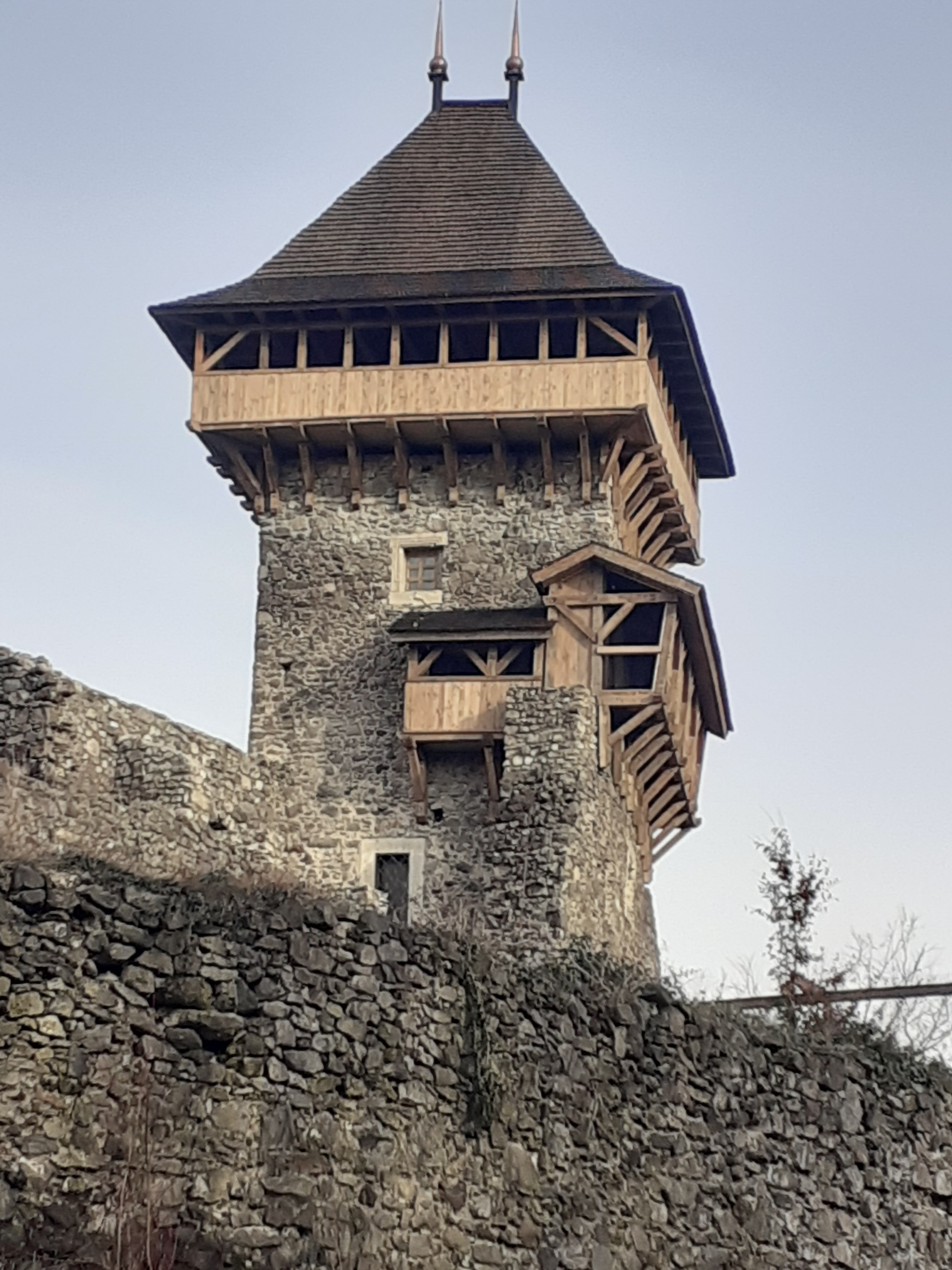
A recently reconstructed tower. The roof of this donjon (keep) collapsed in March 2019

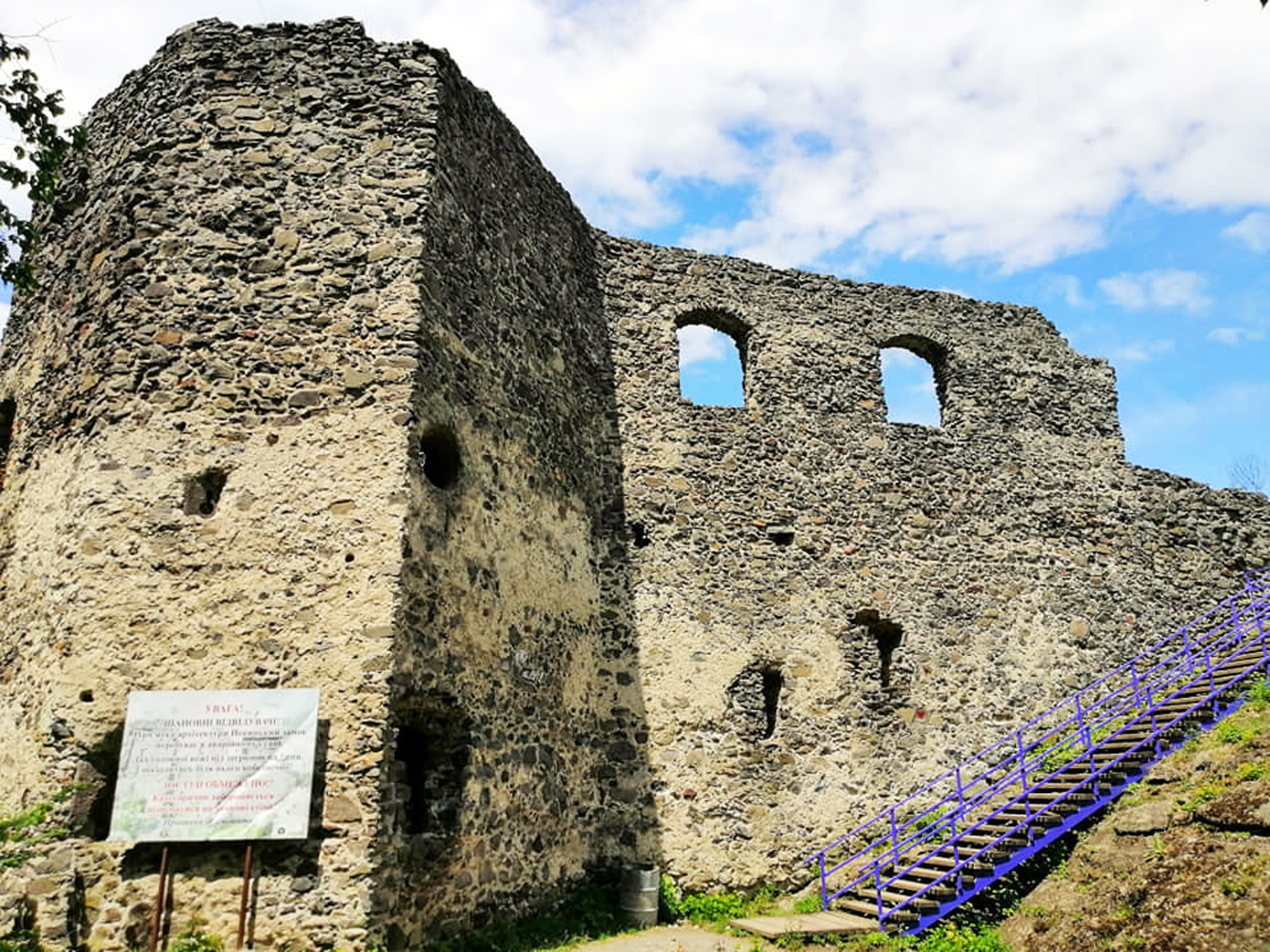

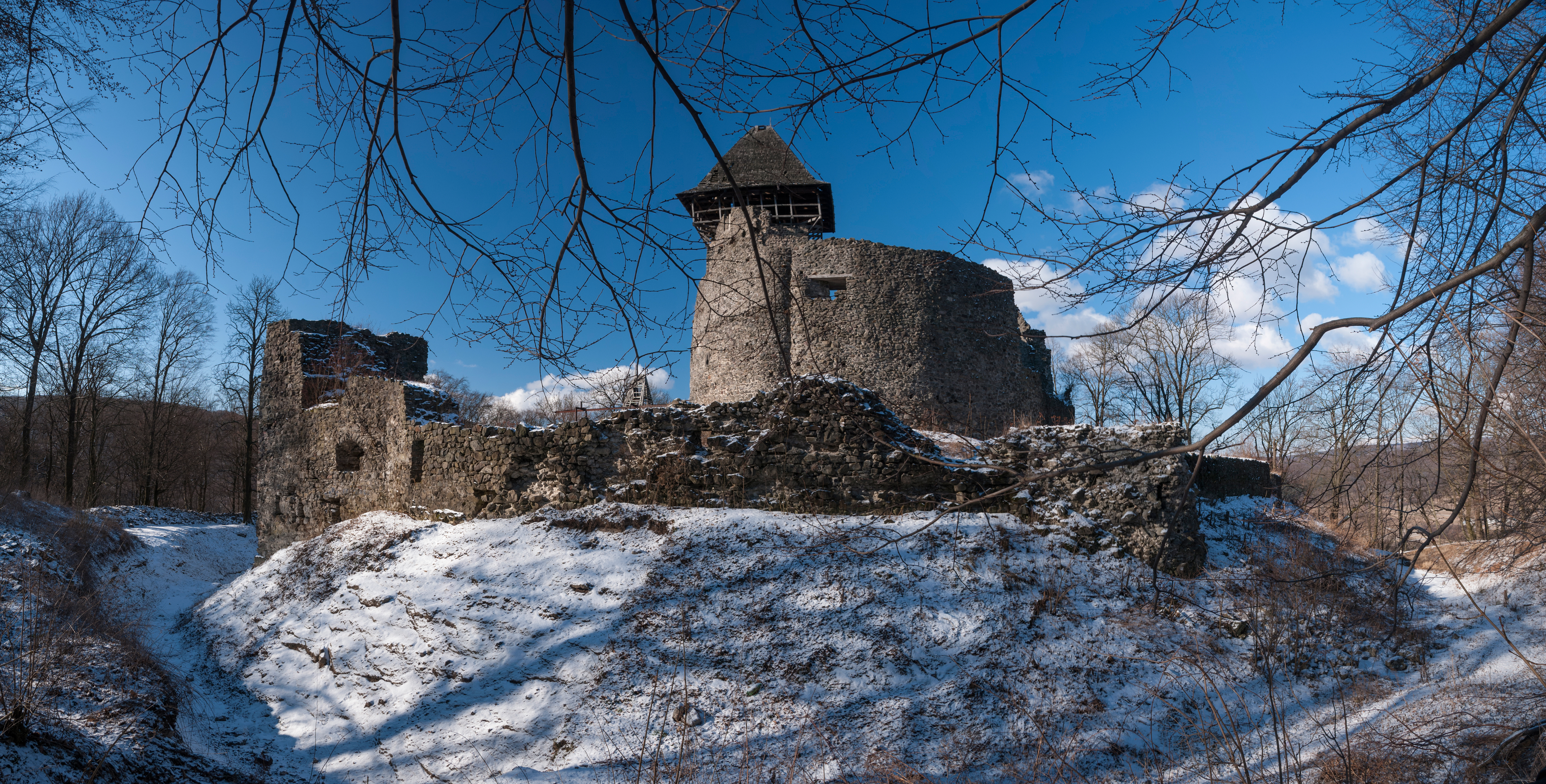
Panorama of Castle

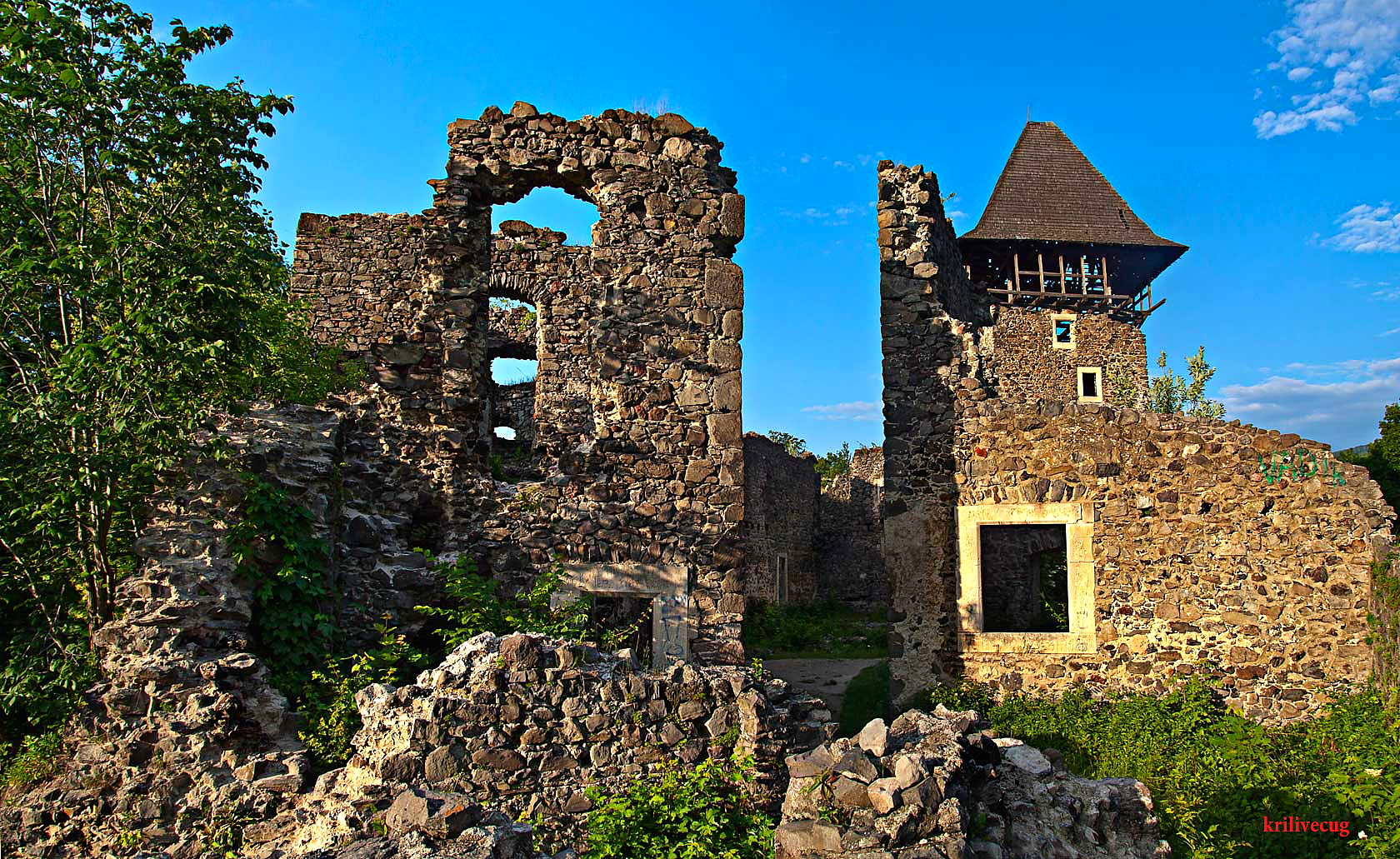

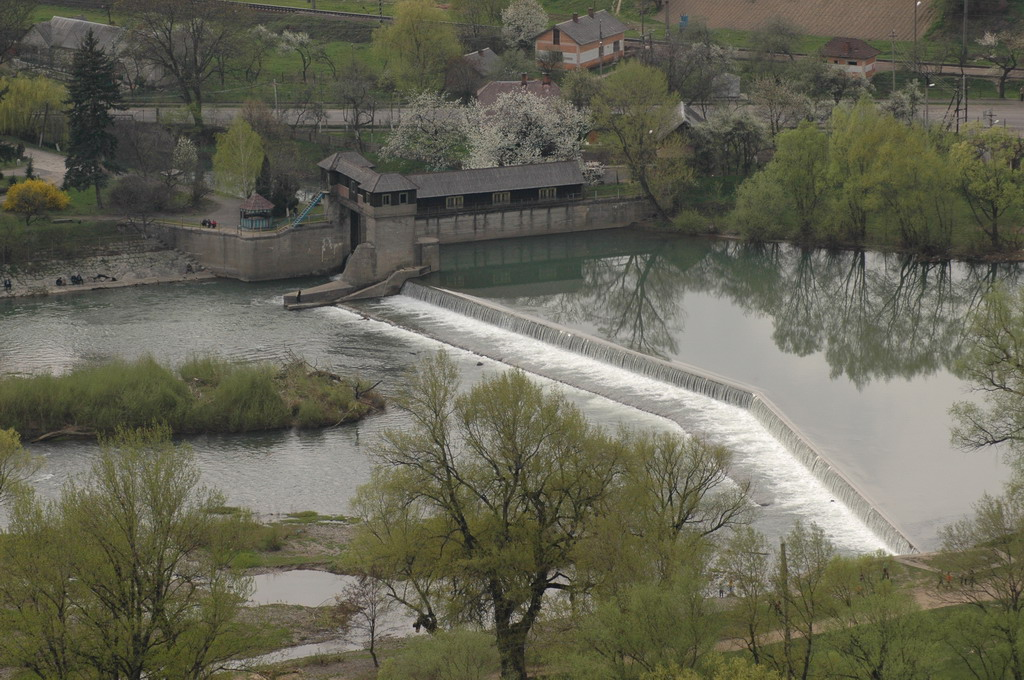
Small dam as seen from the castle

== Sources ==
- Памятники градостроительства и архитектуры Украинской ССР. Киев: Будивельник, 1983–1986. Том 2, с. 200.
