= Uzh =

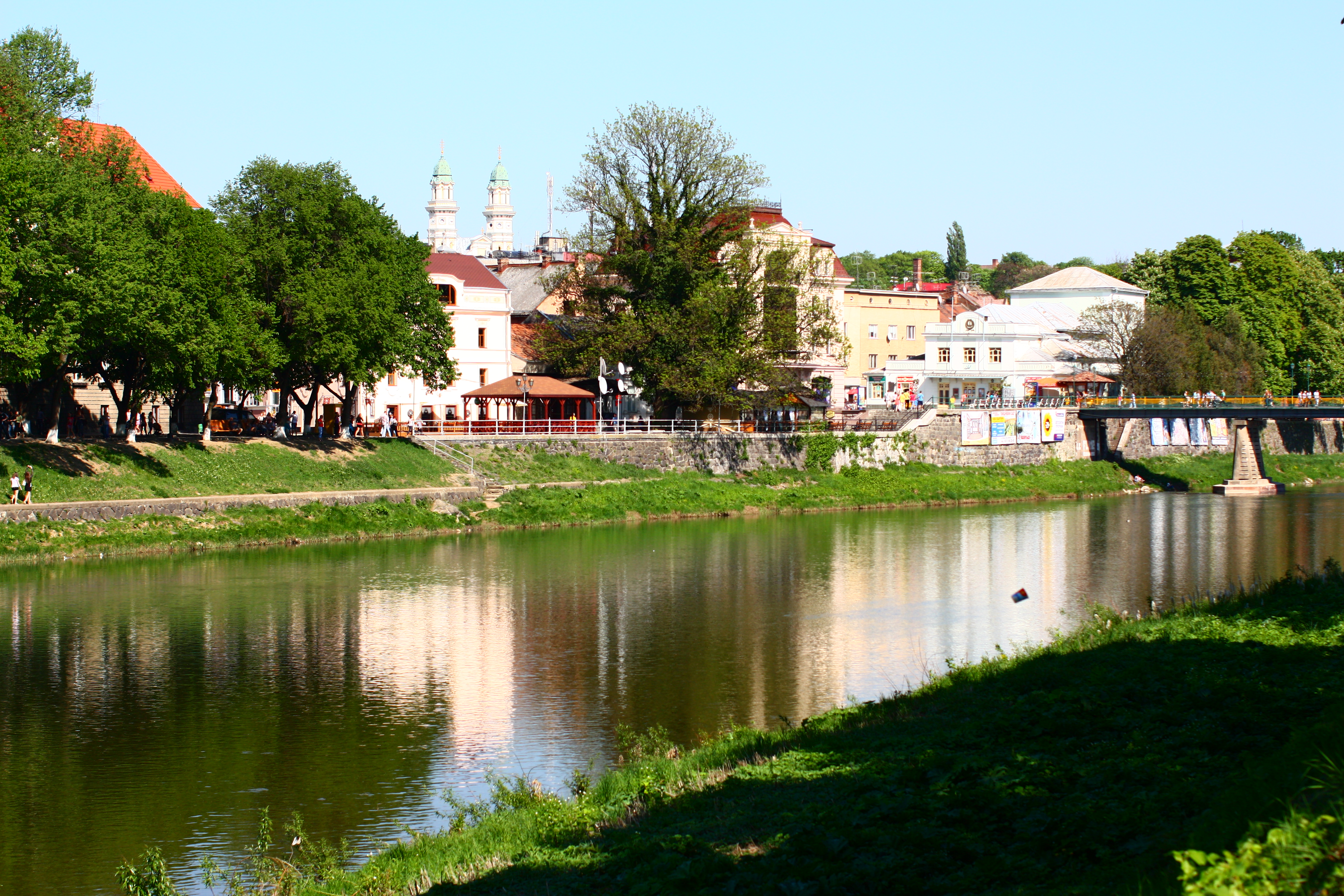
- The Uzh in Uzhhorod, Ukraine, with the Ash of Masaryk in the center

Location
- Country: Ukraine, Slovakia

Physical characteristics
- Source
  - location: Uzhok pass, Ukraine
- Mouth
  - location: Laborec
  - coordinates: 48.5983°N 21.9906°E
- Length: 127 km (79 mi)
- Basin size: 2,750 km^{2} (1,060 sq mi)

Basin features
- Progression: Laborec→ Latorica→ Bodrog→ Tisza→ Danube→ Black Sea

The Uzh (Ukrainian: Уж; Slovak: Uh,; Hungarian: Ung; Polish: Uż) is a river in western Ukraine and eastern Slovakia, flowing from the Ukrainian Carpathians through the city of Uzhhorod, the administrative center of the Zakarpattia Oblast of Ukraine, to the river Laborec in the Eastern Slovak Lowland.

== Etymology ==
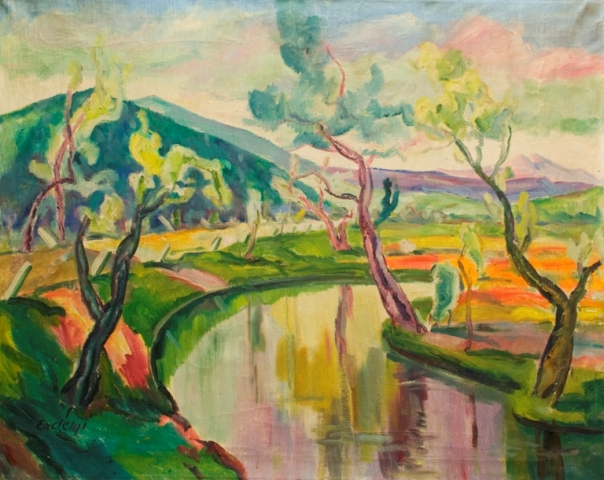
Adalbert Erdeli: River Uzh, 1930. During this period, the river ran wholly in Czechoslovakia.

Etymologists disagree about the origin of the name of the river. Some would derive it from the Slavic name of the grass snake (Ukrainian and Belarusian вуж, Russian уж, from Old East Slavic ꙋжь, Proto-Slavic ǫžь), which is abundant in the valley of the river. However, the expected cognate form in Slovak would be *Už (compare Slovak užovka "adder") while the actual Slovak form of the name is Uh. Another possibility is that the name derives from the proto-Slavic root *ǫgъlъ meaning "angle" or "corner" (the etymological source of Ukrainian вугол, Slovak uhol).

According to the naïve etymology by Anonymus of Gesta Hungarorum, the name of Hungary itself stems from Ung, the name of the river in Hungarian:

Then, hearing these things, Duke Álmos and his leading men were especially gladdened and they rode to the castle of Ung in order to capture it. And as they encamped around the wall, the count of the castle, Loborc by name, who in their language was called duca, hastened in flight to castle Zemlum, and the warriors of the duke, pursuing and capturing him next to some river, hanged him by a noose there and on that day they called the river by his name, Loborc. Then Duke Álmos and his men, entering Ung castle, made great sacrifices to the immortal gods [diis inmortalibus] and feasted for four days. And on the fourth day, having had counsel and taken an oath from all his men, Duke Álmos while yet still living appointed his son, Árpád, as duke and leader, and he was called Árpád, duke of Hunguaria, and from Ung [Hungu] all his warriors were called Hunguarians in the language of foreign nations [linguam alienigenarum], and that name persists throughout the whole world up to now.

— Gesta Hungarorum, 13

== History and inhabitants ==
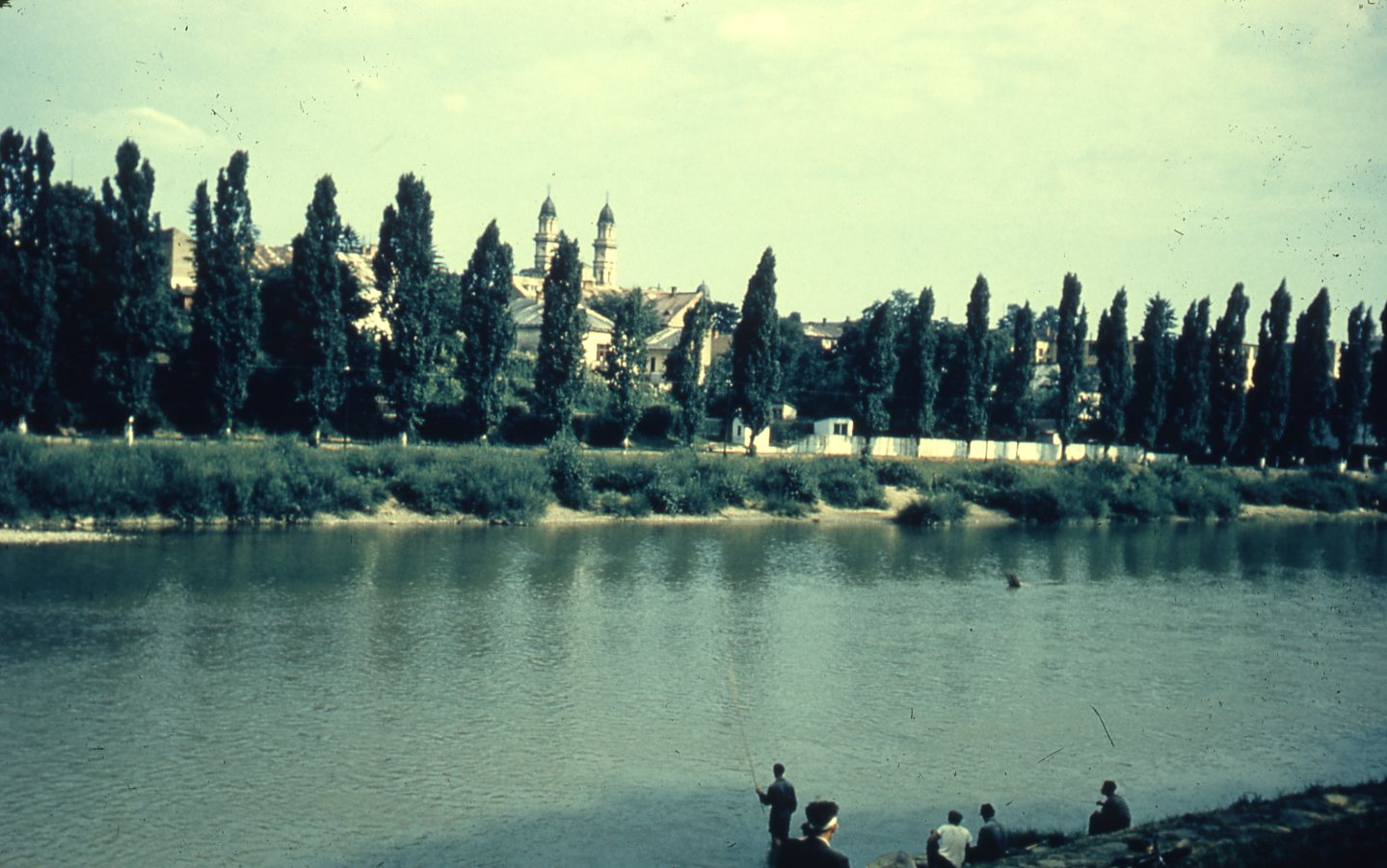
Citizens of Uzhhorod fishing in the river when it flowed through Soviet Ukraine.

In historical times, the Celto-Dacian tribes living among the reaches of the Uzh were the Anartoi and the Anartofraktoi as described by Claudius Ptolemy, later replaced by the Germanic Vandals of the Hasdingi and Lacringi tribes. In the 5th century, the Slavic White Croats have entered Pannonia, and after a period of Avar suzerainty, they were joined by the Magyars, who have migrated across the Carpathian mountains.

Presently, the river is inhabited by Rusyns in its upper reaches, with communities of Ukrainians, Russians, Romani, Slovaks and Hungarians living along its lower parts. The Uzh subdialect of Eastern Slovak takes its name after the river.

== Geography ==
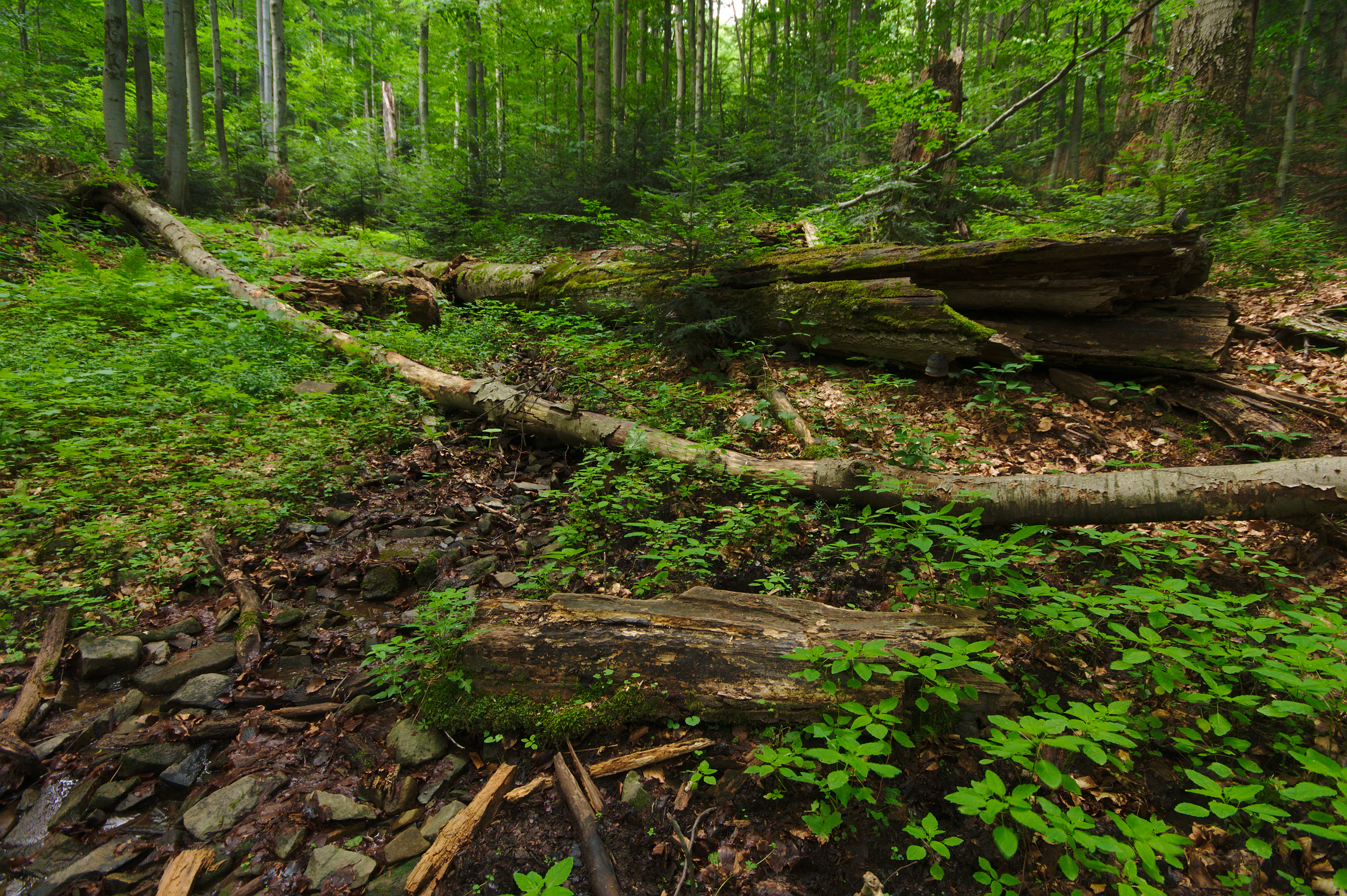
In the Uzh headwaters, the UNESCO-protected Stužica primeval forest is one of the few remaining examples of the original forest ecosystems of Europe.

Springing in the Eastern Beskids of Zakarpattia Oblast of western Ukraine near Uzhok Pass and the border with Poland, the Uzh flows southwestwards through the towns of Velykyi Bereznyi and Perechyn and past the semi-ruined Nevitske Castle into the city of Uzhhorod, named after the river. The Uzh then forms part of the Slovakia–Ukraine border for about 1.5 km (0.93 mi) near the village of Pinkovce, until it enters Slovakia, flowing past Pavlovce nad Uhom and becoming a tributary of the Laborec river near the village of Drahňov in the Michalovce District in the Eastern Slovak flatland.

The Uzh has a course of 127 km (79 mi), of which 21.3 km (13.2 mi) are in Slovakia. It forms part of the Tisza drainage basin. The meander is winding, moderately branched, with low waterfalls and plenty islands.

== Flora and fauna ==
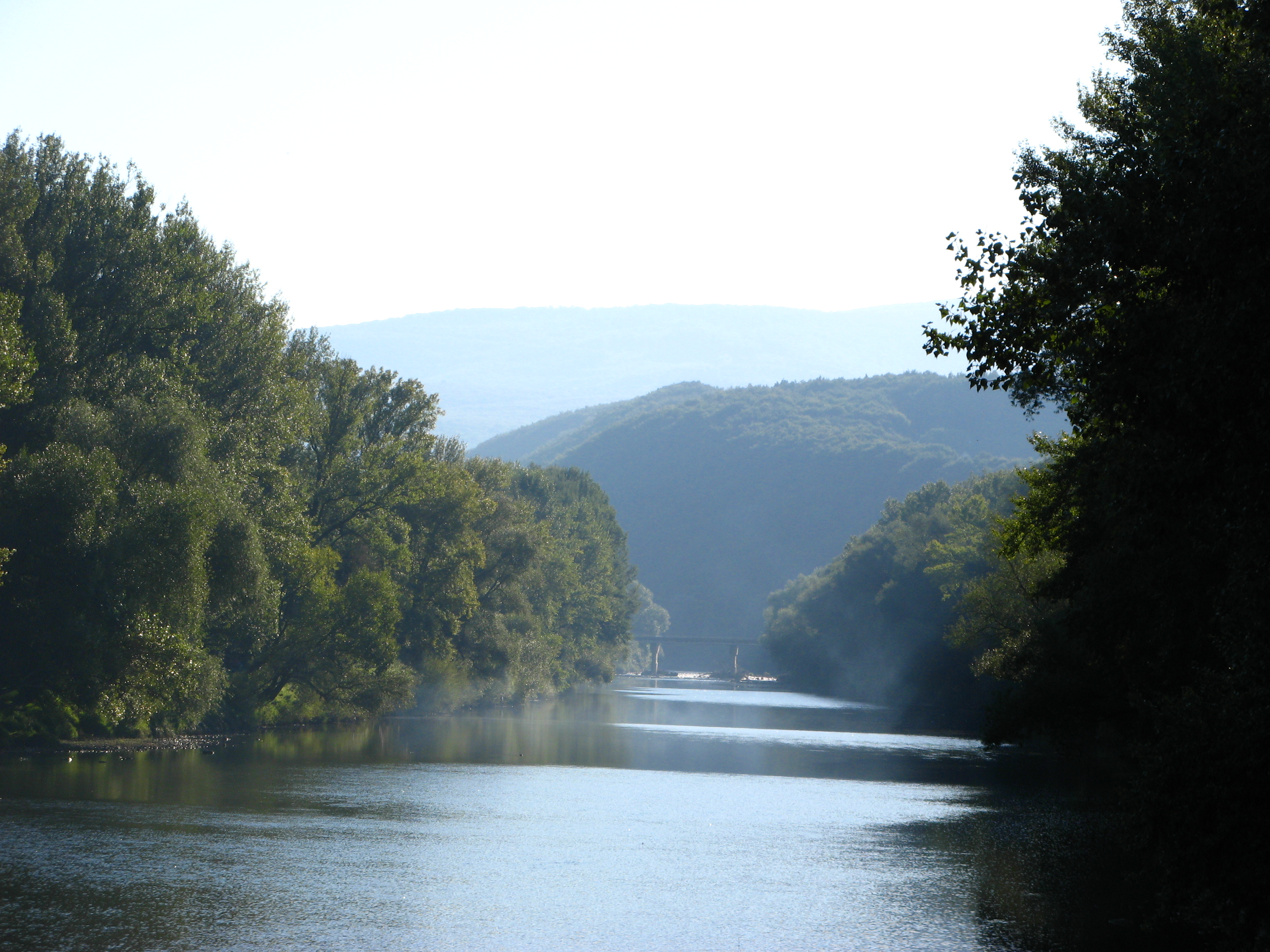
The Uzh upriver, in a valley among the Carpathians

The river flows through the East Carpathian Biosphere Reserve, with its basin area including both the Uzh National Nature Park and Poloniny National Park, as well as the Stužica primeval beech forest in the Bukovec Mountains, a UNESCO World Heritage Site, representing some of the last remnants of the virgin forest ecosystems that once covered much of temperate Europe.

Beech or fir forests predominate in the basin area, while scrub beechwoods and polonynas occur at higher elevations. Notable plant species include Lady Josika's lilac (Syringa josikaea), with many others listed in the Red Data Book of Ukraine. The forest canopy supports the saproxylic alpine longhorn beetle (Rosalia alpina). Wetland communities of birds and amphibians, such as the Carpathian newt (Lissotriton montandoni) are found along the middle course of the river.

The basin is one of the few areas in Central Europe where three large carnivores, brown bears, Eurasian lynx, and wolves coexist. The territory supports the black stork and the golden eagle. The river is home to salmonid fish, including the European grayling (Thymallus thymallus), subject to local conservation protection, and historically provided habitat for the Danube salmon (Hucho hucho), now critically reduced across its native range.

== Regions ==
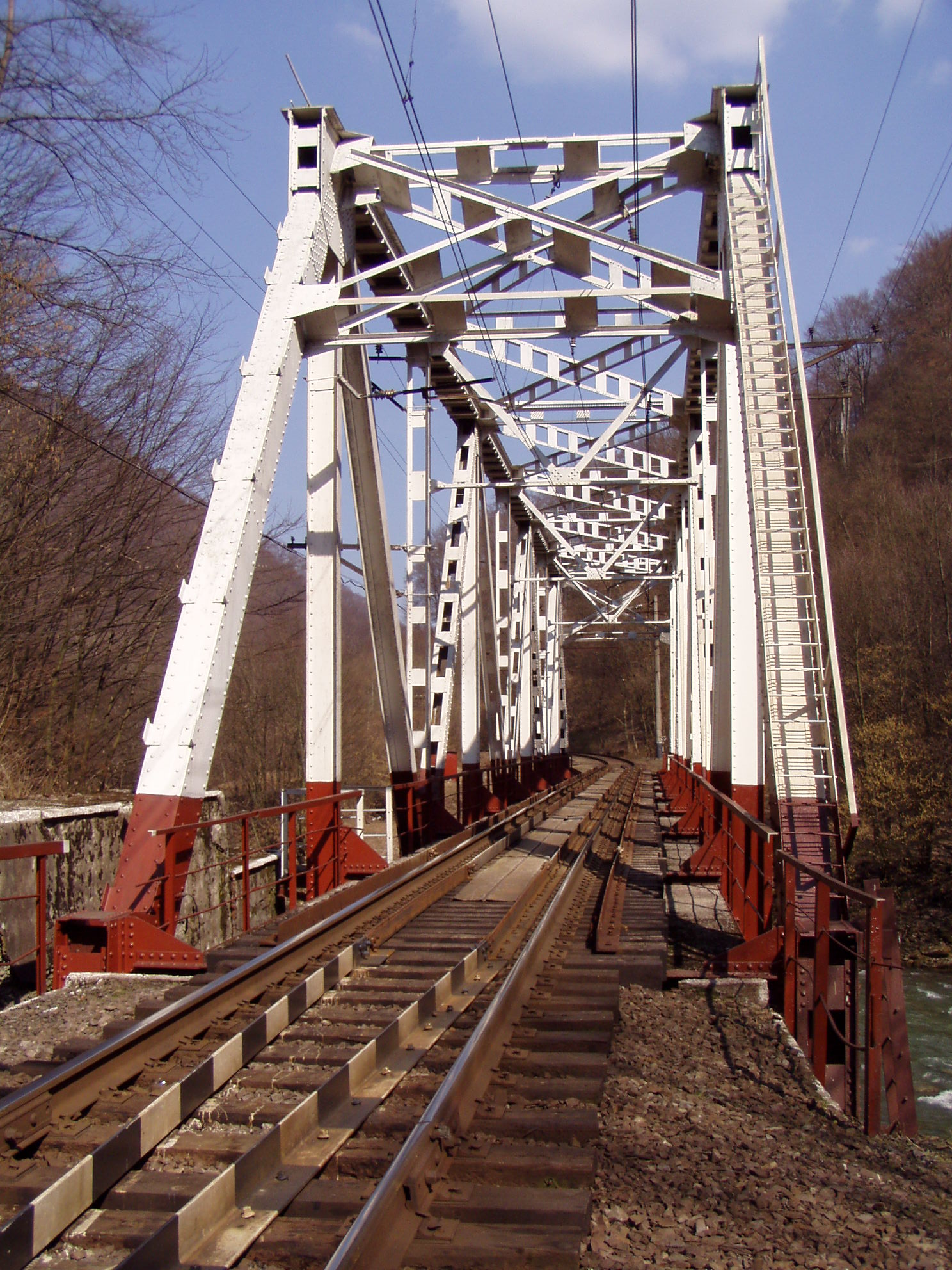
A railway bridge over the Uzh at Sil' on the line from Uzhhorod towards Sambir and Lviv

The Uzh flows through the Uzhhorod Raion in the Zakarpattia Oblast of western Ukraine and in the districts of Sobrance and Michalovce in the Košice Region of eastern Slovakia, while the drainage basin also includes the Snina District of Slovakia, through the Ulička and Ublianka rivers.

The former Ung County of the Kingdom of Hungary, also being named after the river, has mostly consisted of the drainage basin of the Uzh.

== Tributaries ==
The principal right-bank tributaries, listed in downstream order, are: Ug, Strychavka, Ulychka, Ublya, Kamyanitsa, Dvernitsky, Domarach, Vulshava, Syry Potik, and Hachanyk, followed downstream of the border with Slovakia by the Veľké Revištia–Bežovce canal and Čierna voda. The main left-bank tributaries are the Velykiy, Lyuta, Tur'ya, and Simony.

== Economy ==
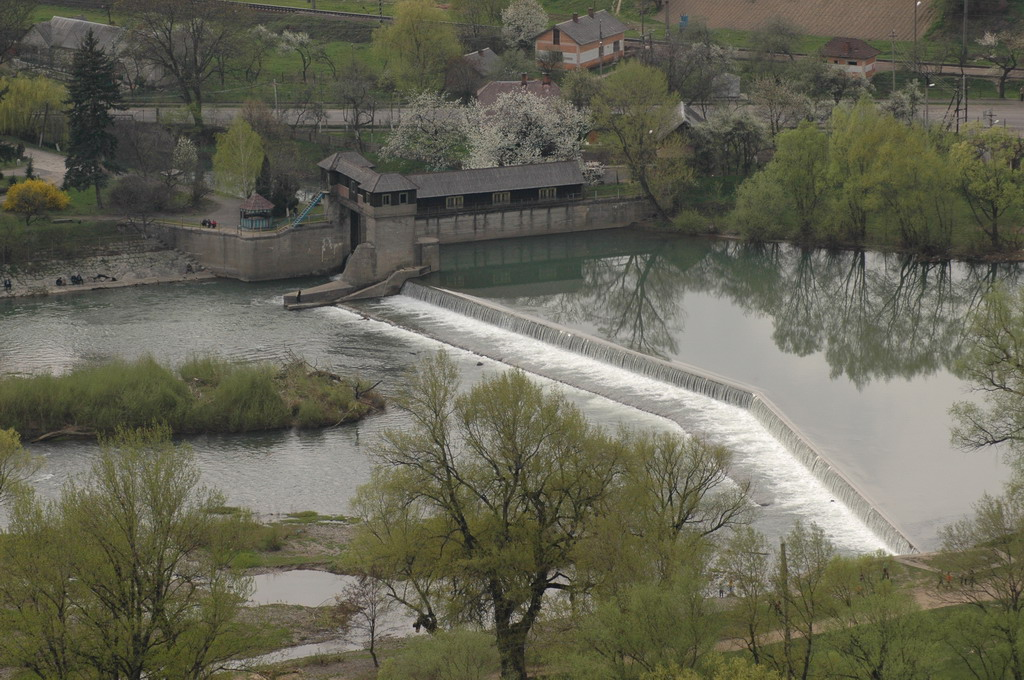
A small hydropower plant on the Uzh River at Nevytske

The river feeds numerous industries and is a source of drinking water and irrigation. It also has a hydropower station on its derivate channel at Uzhhorod and another one above at a weir at Nevytske. It is a source of minerals and natural gas is being extracted at its lowest reaches at Pavlovce nad Uhom and Stretava.

== See also ==
- Uzh National Nature Park
