= Volosianka =

Volosianka (Ukrainian: Волосянка) is an inhabited locality in Ukraine and it may refer to:

- Volosianka, Lviv Oblast, a village in Skole Raion, Lviv Oblast
- Volosianka, Zakarpattia Oblast, a village in Velykyi Bereznyi Raion, Zakarpattia Oblast

== See also ==
- Mala Volosianka, village in Turka Raion, Lviv Oblast
