= Liuta =

Liuta Люта Havasköz
- Church of the Nativity of Theotokos

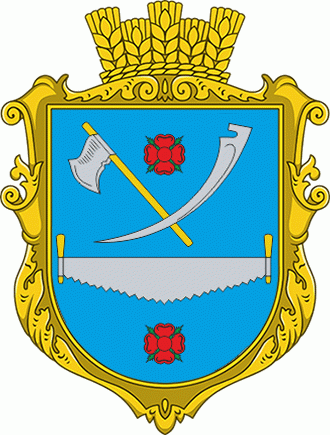
- Coat of arms

- Location of Liuta in Zakarpattia Oblast Location of Liuta in Ukraine
- Coordinates: 48°54′0″N 22°46′0″E
- Country: Ukraine
- Oblast: Zakarpattia Oblast
- Raion: Uzhhorod Raion
- Established: 9th century
- Elevation: 540 m (1,770 ft)

Population
  - Total: 2,412
- Time zone: UTC+2 (EET)
  - Summer (DST): UTC+3 (EET)

Liuta, also Ljuta (Ukrainian: Люта; Hungarian: Havasköz) is a small village located in the Uzhhorod Raion of Zakarpattia Oblast of Ukraine.

== Geography ==
Lyuta lies at the foot of the Carpathian Mountains, about 25 miles (40 km) northeast of Uzhhorod and 362 miles (583 km) West-SouthWest of Kyiv. It is on the bank of the Liutianka River. The name of the village means snowyside/snowycorner because of the cold winters in the area. Its history dates back to 1599. The estimated population is under 4000 people.

Until 18 July 2020, Liuta belonged to Velykyi Bereznyi Raion. The raion was abolished in July 2020 as part of the administrative reform of Ukraine, which reduced the number of raions of Zakarpattia Oblast to six. The area of Velykyi Bereznyi Raion was merged into Uzhhorod Raion.

== See also ==
- Carpathian Ruthenia
- Carpatho-Ukraine
