= Nadsianskyi Regional Landscape Park =

Regional landscape park in Lviv Oblast, Ukraine

- Ukrainian: Регіональний ландшафтний парк «Надсянський»
- IUCN category V (protected landscape/seascape)
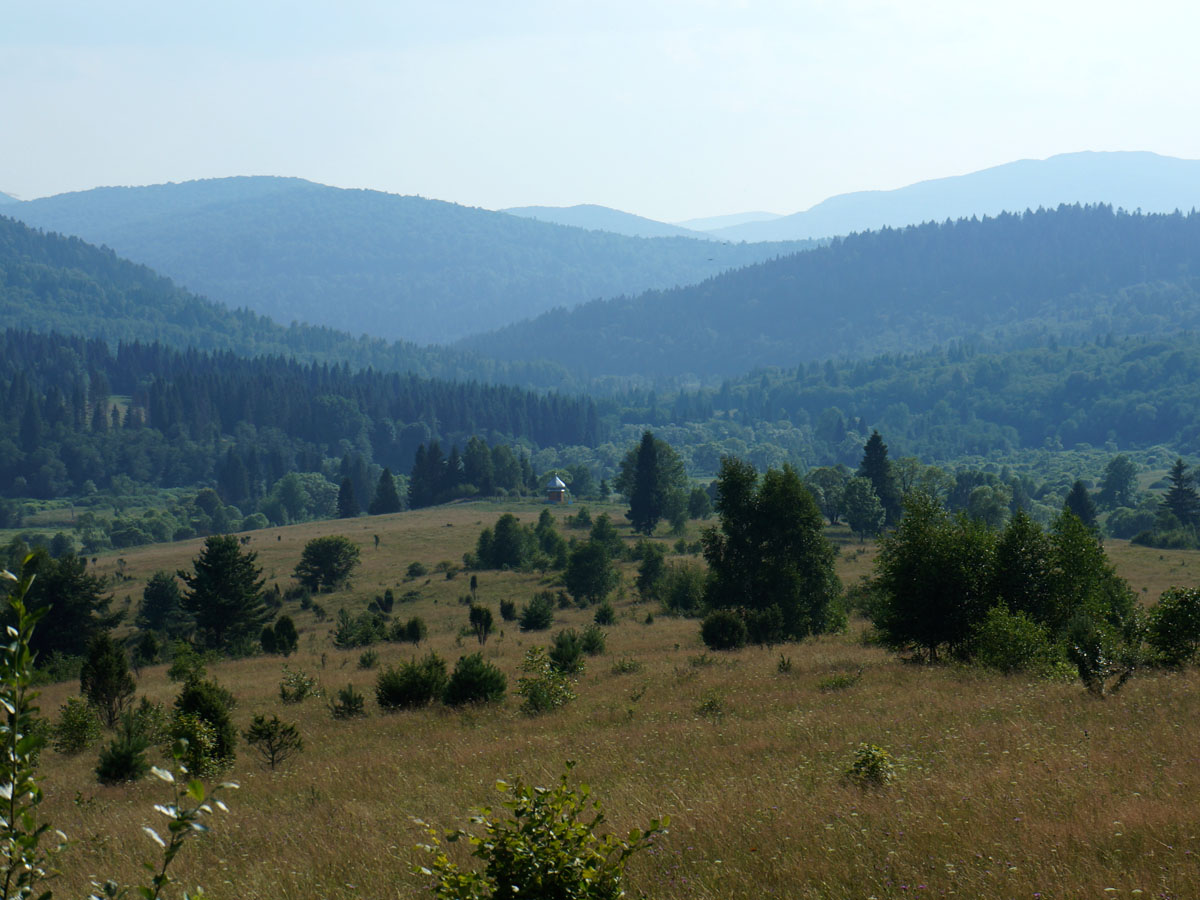
- San Valley

- Location within Lviv Oblast Location within Ukraine
- Location: Stryi Raion, Lviv Oblast, Ukraine
- Nearest city: Turka and Borynia
- Coordinates: 49°09′58″N 22°52′12″E
- Area: 19,428 ha (194.28 km^{2}; 75.01 mi^{2})
- Designation: Regional Park
- Established: 1997
- Governing body: Lviv Oblast Council

The Nadsianskyi Regional Landscape Park (Ukrainian: Регіональний ландшафтний парк «Надсянський», lit. ''Circum-San'') is a protected area in Ukraine. The park is part of East Carpathian Biosphere Reserve.

== See also ==
- Protected areas of Ukraine
