= Uzh National Nature Park =

National park in Ukraine

Uzhanskyi National Nature Park
- Ukrainian: Ужанський національний природний парк
- IUCN category II (national park)
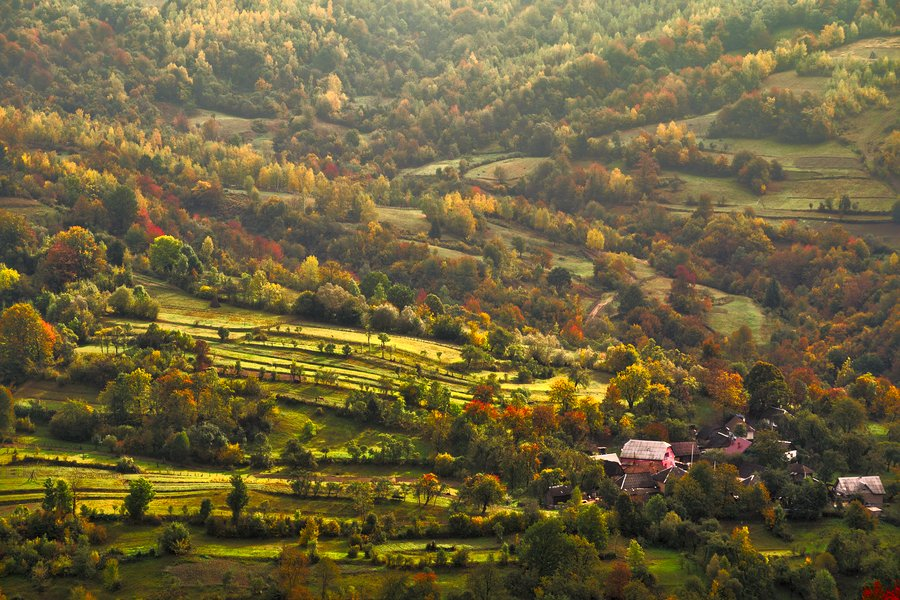

- Location within Zakarpattia Oblast Location within Ukraine
- Location: Zakarpattia Oblast, Ukraine
- Nearest city: Velykyi Bereznyi
- Coordinates: 49.0233°N 22.6000°E
- Area: 39,159.3 ha (391.593 km^{2}; 151.195 mi^{2})
- Designation: National Park
- Established: 5 August 1999

Uzhanskyi National Nature Park (Ukrainian: Ужанський національний природний парк, romanized: Uzhanskyi natsionalnyi pryrodnyi park) is a protected area in Ukraine. It is located in Uzhhorod Raion of Zakarpattia Oblast, at the border with Poland and Slovakia. The national park was created on 5 August 1999 and has the area of 39,159.3 hectares (151.195 mi^{2}). Since 2007, it is part of the World Heritage site Primeval Beech Forests of the Carpathians and Other Regions of Europe. It is also part of the East Carpathian Biosphere Reserve. The park was created to protect the pristine beech forest of the Carpathians.

== History ==
In 1908, when the Transcarpathia still belonged to the Austro-Hungarian Empire, a nature reserve in the upper valley of the Stuzhychanka River to protect the beech forest landscape. The area of the reserve was 331.8 hectares (1.281 mi^{2}). At the same time, a forest reserve of the area of 14.9 hectares (0.058 mi^{2}) was created in the upper valley of the Uzh River. Between 1919 and 1938, the Transcarpathia belonged to Czechoslovakia, and both reserves were considerably expanded in area. Another reserve was created on the Yavirnyk Mountain. After World War II, the area was completely neglected, and mass timber production started. In 1974, during the Soviet period, Stuzhytsia Forest Landscape Reserve was established. The area of the reserve was 2,542 hectares (9.81 mi^{2}). In 1995, the reserve was upgraded to a regional landscape park, and in 1999 to a national nature park.

== Geography ==
Views of Uzhanskyi National Nature Park from Uzhok pass observation deck

The park is located in the valleys of the Uzh and its tributaries, as well as of the San, in the western slopes of the Carpathian Mountains. The highest point of the park is Kinchyk Bukovskyi Mountain (1,251 metres (4,104 ft)). Uzh National Nature Park contains four altitude zones, including beech forest, alder forest, and, above 1,100 metres (3,600 ft), alpine meadows. The climate is temperate, with the annual rainfall being around (900 millimetres (35 in), and temperatures in winter below zero, so that the mountains are covered in snow.

== Ecosystem ==
There are over 1500 species of plants in the park; about 22 of vascular plant species are endemic, and 52 species, including 23 species of orchids, are protected at the national level.

Big mammals include red deer, roe deer, wild boar, red fox, and badger. There are 114 bird species.

== Tourism and infrastructure ==
The area is populated by Lemkos and has a strong influence of their culture. In particular, six wooden churches built in 17th-18th centuries survived inside the park.

17 trails are signposted within the park.

== See also ==
- Transcarpathian Dark-Sky Park – Dark-sky park in Ukraine
