= Uzhok Pass =

- Ужоцький перевал
- Location within Zakarpattia Oblast
- Elevation: 889 m (2,917 ft)
- Traversed by: Rail in tunnel (and road)

Location
- Location: Ukraine, on the border of Stryi Raion and Velykyi Bereznyi Raion
- Range: Carpathians
- Coordinates: 49°00′10″N 22°53′15″E

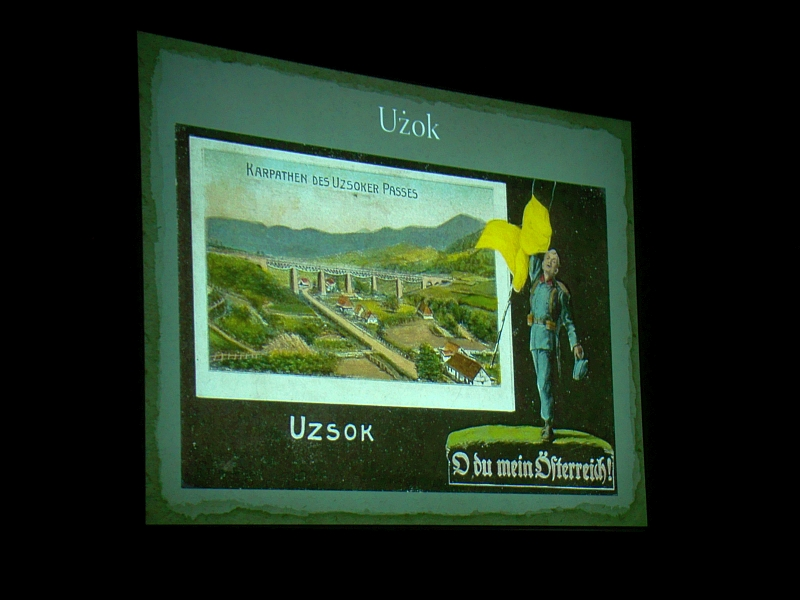
Photo of a postcard that portrays Uzhok pass in Carpathians

Uzhok Pass (Ukrainian: Ужоцький перевал; Hungarian: Uzsoki-hágó) is a mountain pass in the north-eastern Carpathian Mountains in Ukraine through the Vodorazdel'nyy backbone. It located on a ridge at 889 metres (2,917 ft) high.

It is located on the border of Stryi Raion (Lviv Oblast) and Velykyi Bereznyi Raion (Zakarpattia Oblast), on the watershed of San River and Uzh River. The pass is also close to the Poland-Ukraine border.

In World War I, the pass was the scene of fierce fighting between the advancing Russian Army and the defending Austro-Hungarian forces in the winter of 1914–1915.

== Gallery ==
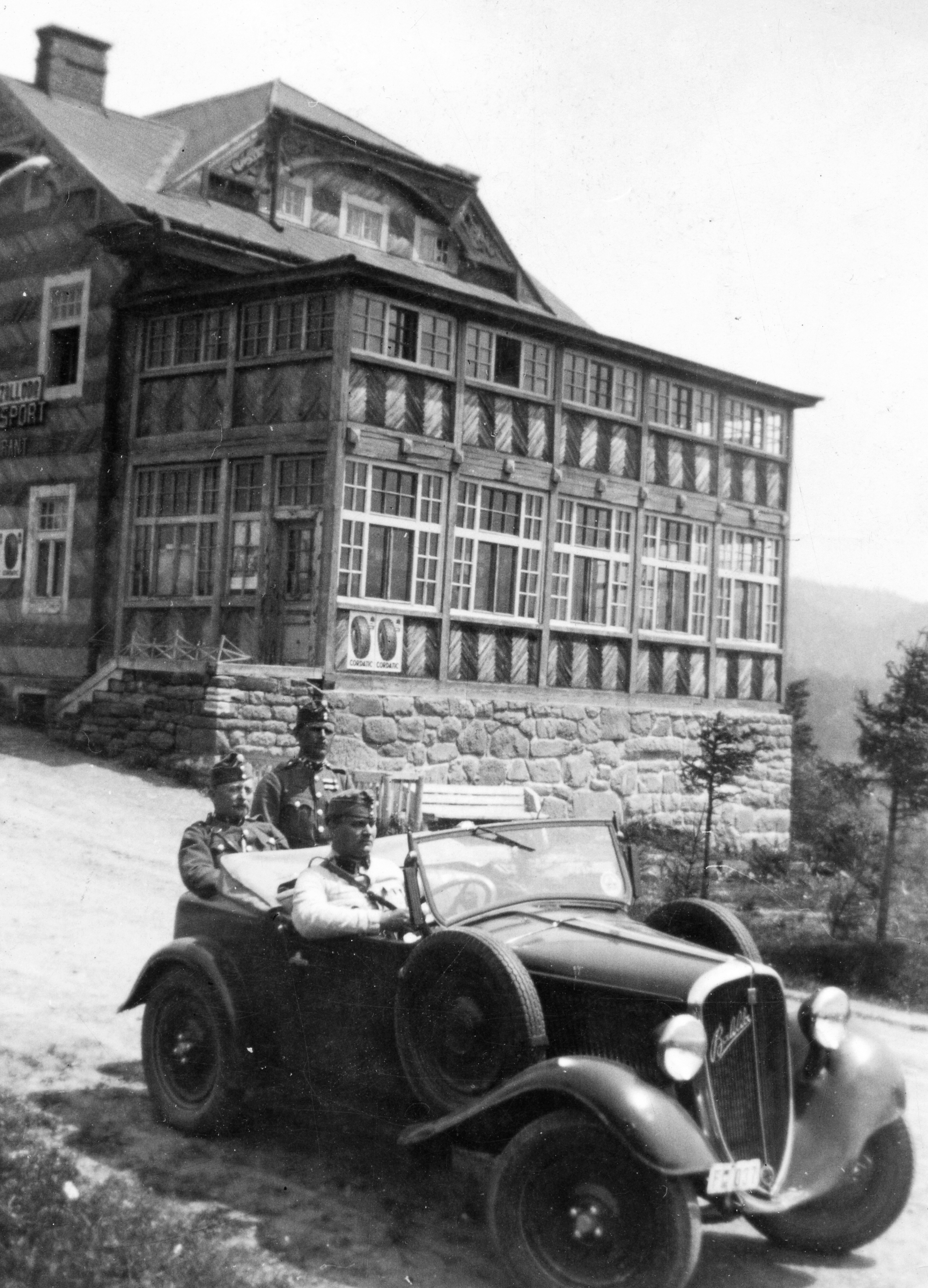
Hungarian soldiers in a Fiat Balilla 508 at Uzhok pass in 1939

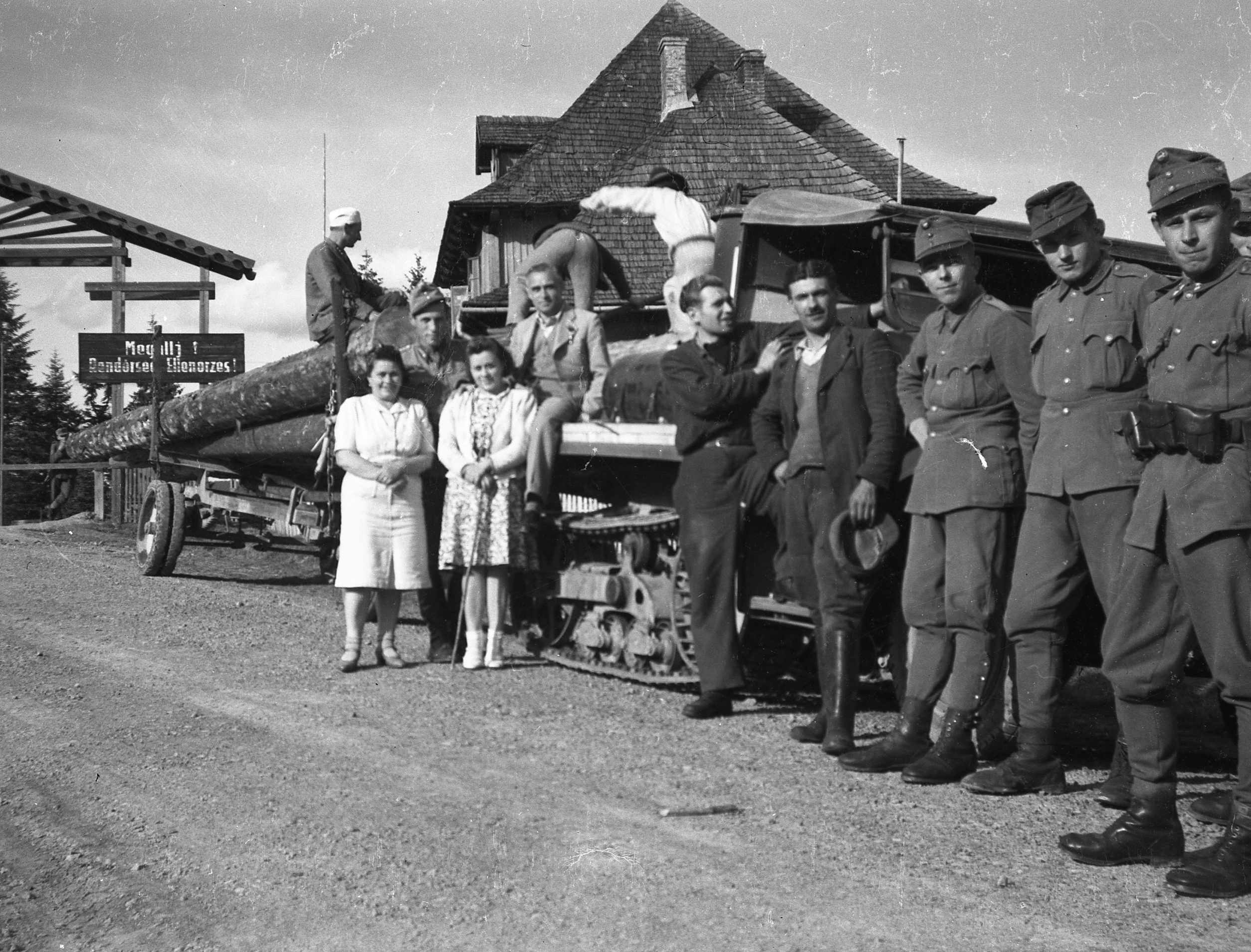
Hungarian-Soviet border at Uzhok pass, 1940

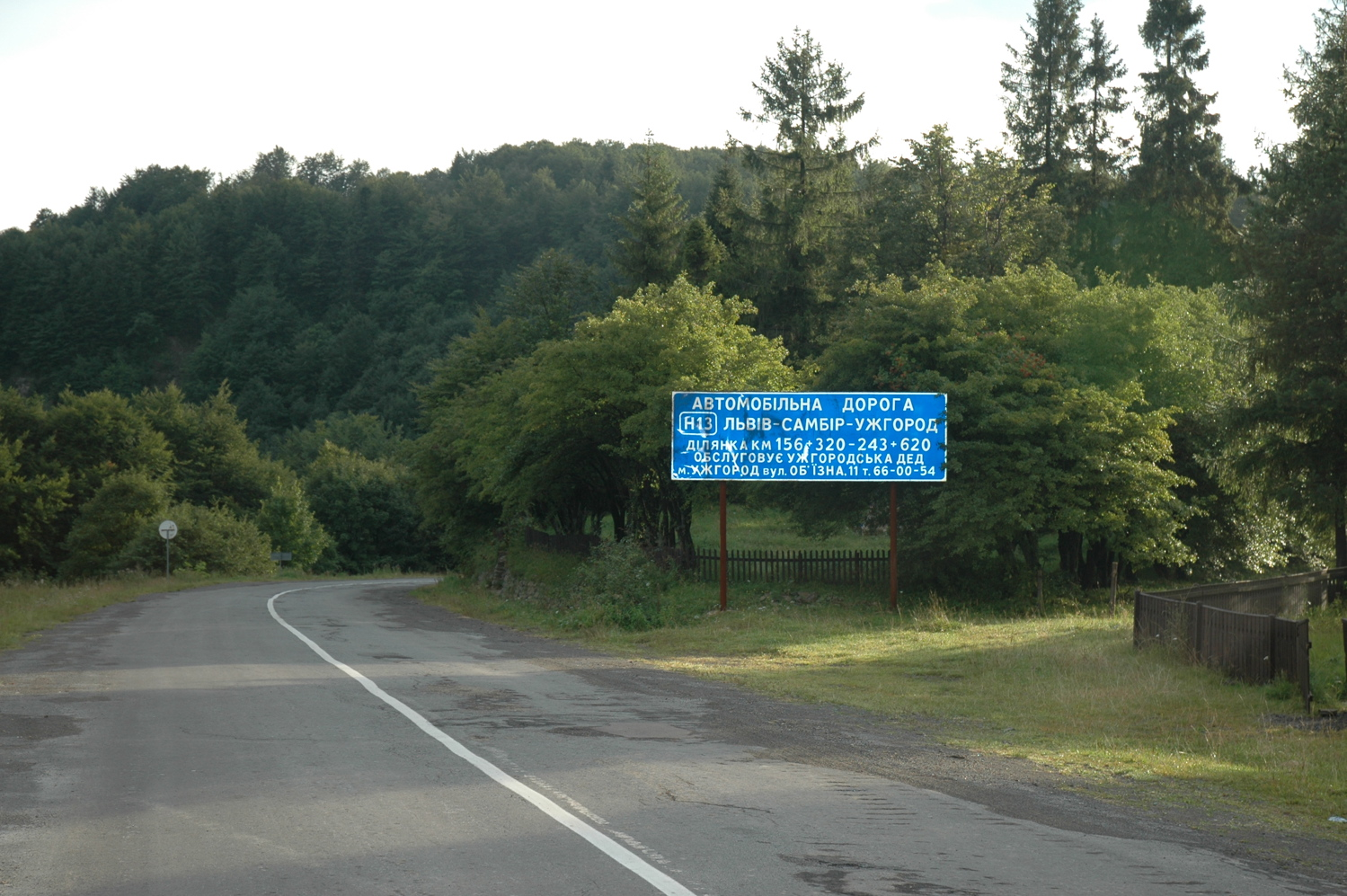
Highway H13

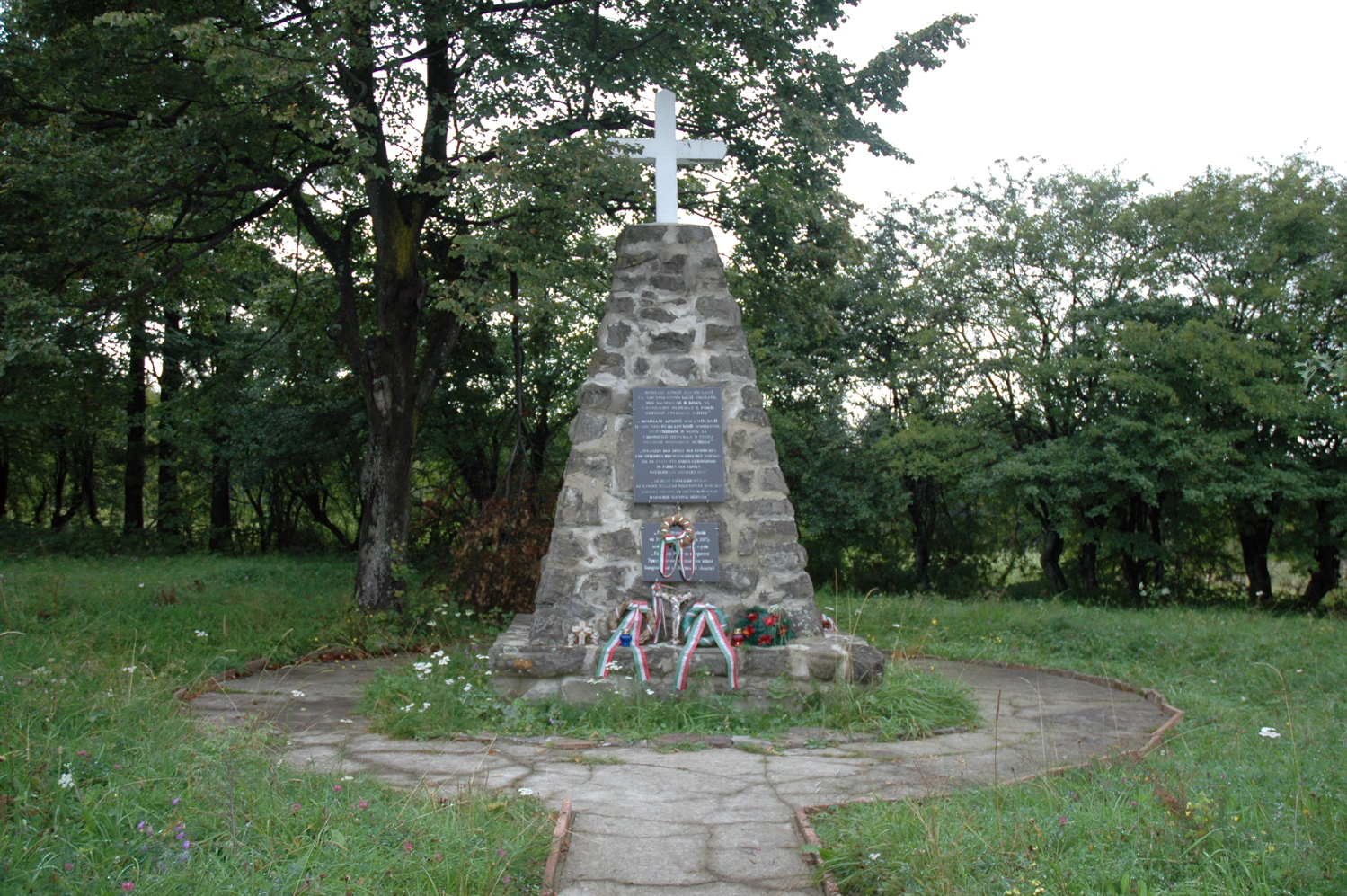
Monument to Austrian-Hungarian and Russian soldiers fallen during World War I

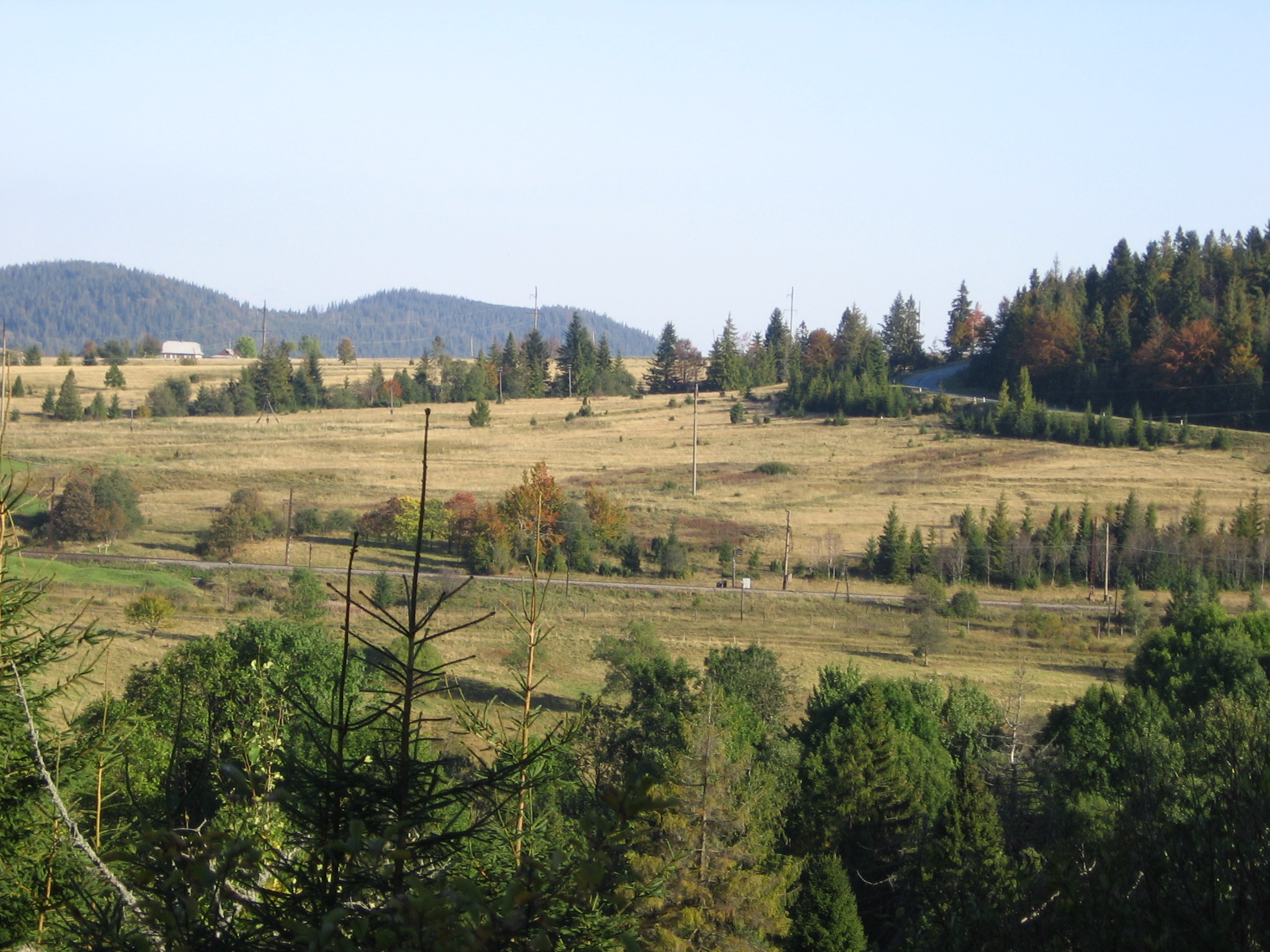
View of Uzhok pass from the Polish side

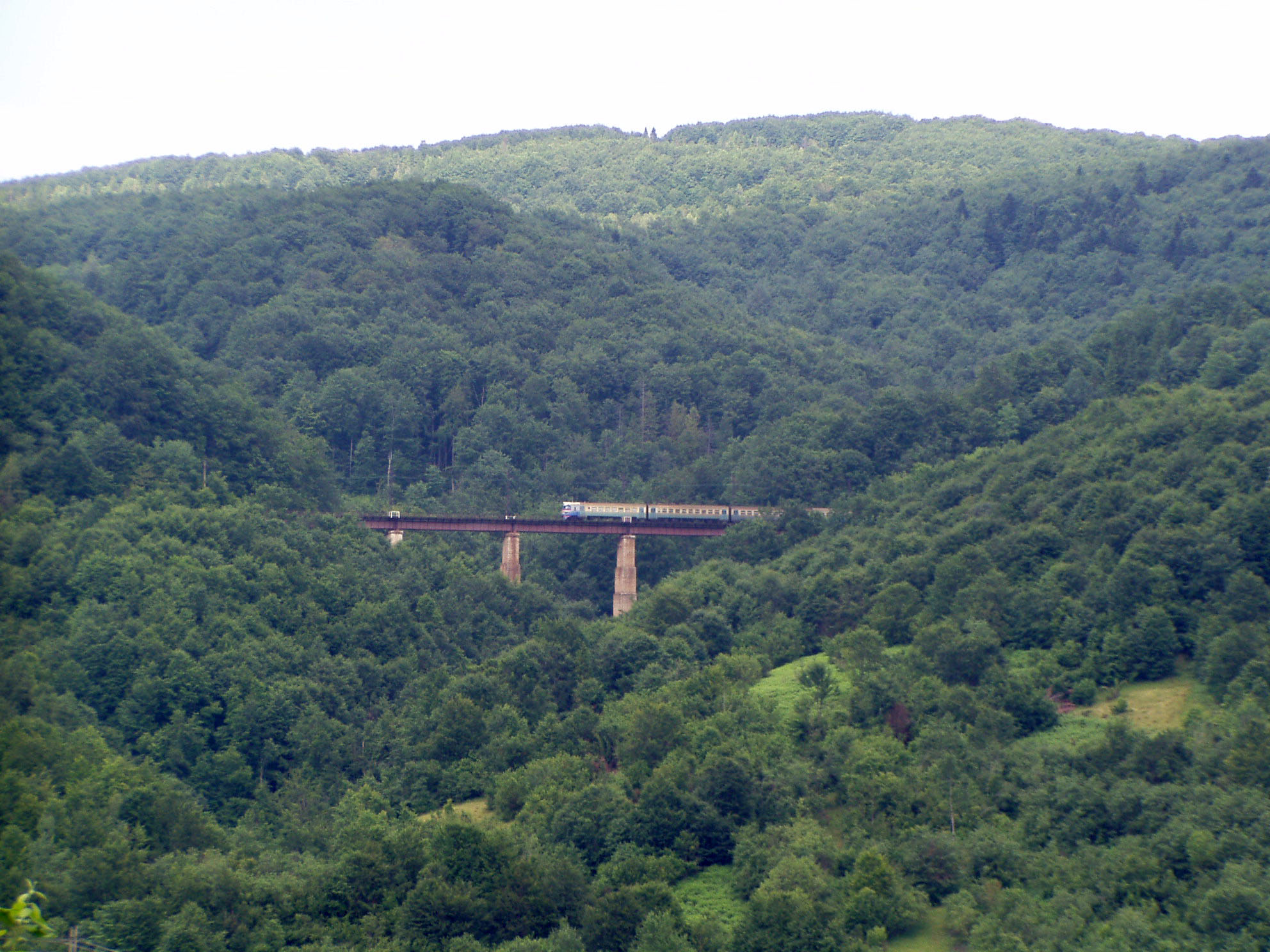
Railroad viaduct

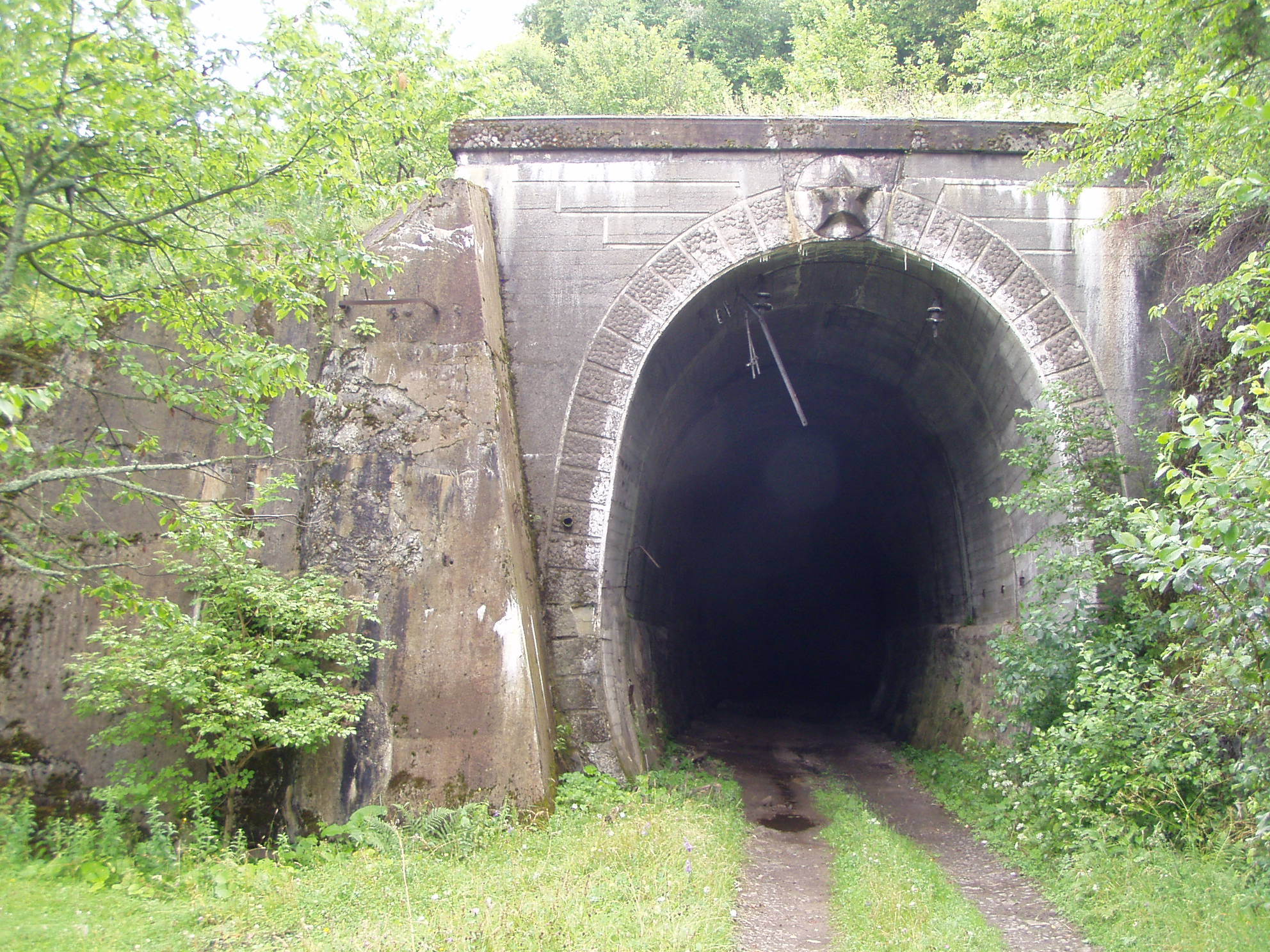
Abandoned tunnel
