= Velykyi Bereznyi =

Rural settlement in Zakarpattia Oblast, Ukraine

Velykyi Bereznyi Великий Березний Veľké Berezné • Nagyberezna
- Rural settlement
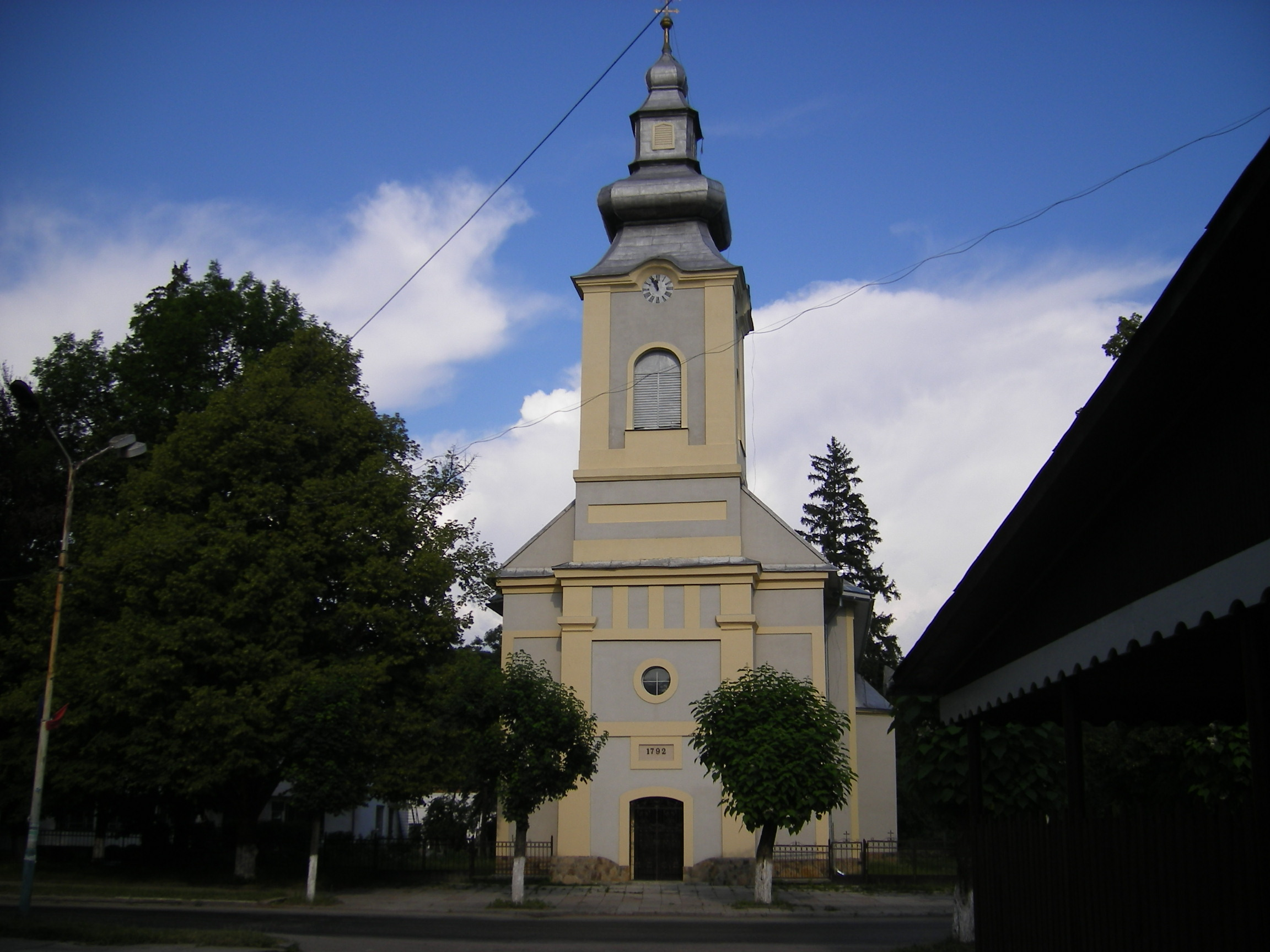
- Catholic church

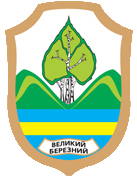
- Flag Coat of arms
- Interactive map of Velykyi Bereznyi
- Location within Zakarpattia Oblast Location within Ukraine
- Coordinates: 48°53′37″N 22°27′27″E
- Country: Ukraine
- Oblast: Zakarpattia Oblast
- Raion: Uzhhorod Raion
- Hromada: Velykyi Bereznyi settlement hromada
- Established: 1409
- Town status: 1947

Government
  - Town Head: Bohdan Kyrlyk

Area
  - Total: 4.1 km^{2} (1.6 sq mi)
- Elevation: 207 m (679 ft)

Population (2022)
  - Total: 7,713
  - Density: 1,900/km^{2} (4,900/sq mi)
- Time zone: UTC+2 (EET)
  - Summer (DST): UTC+3 (EEST)
- Postal code: 89000
- Area code: +380 3135
- Website: vberez-rada.gov.ua

Velykyi Bereznyi (Ukrainian: Великий Березний; Slovak: Veľké Berezné; Hungarian: Nagyberezna) is a rural settlement in Uzhhorod Raion, Zakarpattia Oblast, western Ukraine. The settlement was formerly the administrative center of Velykyi Bereznyi Raion, housing the district's local administration buildings until the raion's abolition, and is now administered within Uzhhorod Raion. The settlement's population was 6,655 as of the 2001 Ukrainian Census and 7,078 in 2011. Current population: 7,713 (2022 estimate). Velykyi Bereznyi is located on the Uzh river. Sources of mineral water are found in the vicinity.

== History ==
The first mention of the settlement, named after the birch tree (Ukrainian: береза, bereza), dates back to 1409, when the kenez (headman) Boncha prosecuted the culprit for some crime and a trial was held over him. In the state tax list for 1427, it is said that Velikiy Berezny belongs to the possessions of the Uzhhorod Dominion of the Counts of Druget. According to the urbar of 1691, the current district (the center and surrounding villages) was part of the 4th district of the Uzhhorod Dominion of Count Bercheny, the heir of the Drugets, as a district.

As of 1427, there were 33 peasant yards, that is, approximately 150 souls. According to the urban census of 1791, there were 80 serf families with allotments and 70 landless residents in the village.

Residents of Velykyi Bereznyi region took an active part in the liberation war of 1703–1711. In September 1703, rebel units under the leadership of Ivan Betsa, who came down from the mountains, besieged the Uzhhorod fortress.

According to the Geographical Dictionary of Hungary, as of 1839, 1,216 people lived in Velykyi Bereznyi, of which 750 were Ruthenian Greek Catholics, i.e., Rusyns, 300 Roman Catholics, i.e. Hungarians and Germans, and 160 Jews.

Under Czechoslovak rule Velykyi Bereznyi served as a district centre.

From December 22, 2019, Velykyi Bereznyi became the center of the formed Velykyi Bereznyi settlement hromada, which consists of Velykyi Bereznyi, Roztotska Pastil, Kosteva Pastil, Behendiatska Pastil, Ruskyi Mochar, Strychava, Kniahynia, and Zabrid.

Until 26 January 2024, Velykyi Bereznyi was designated urban-type settlement. On this day, a new law entered into force which abolished this status, and Velykyi Bereznyi became a rural settlement.

== See also ==
- Uzh National Nature Park – National park in Ukraine
- Transcarpathian Dark-Sky Park – Dark-sky park in Ukraine

== Gallery ==
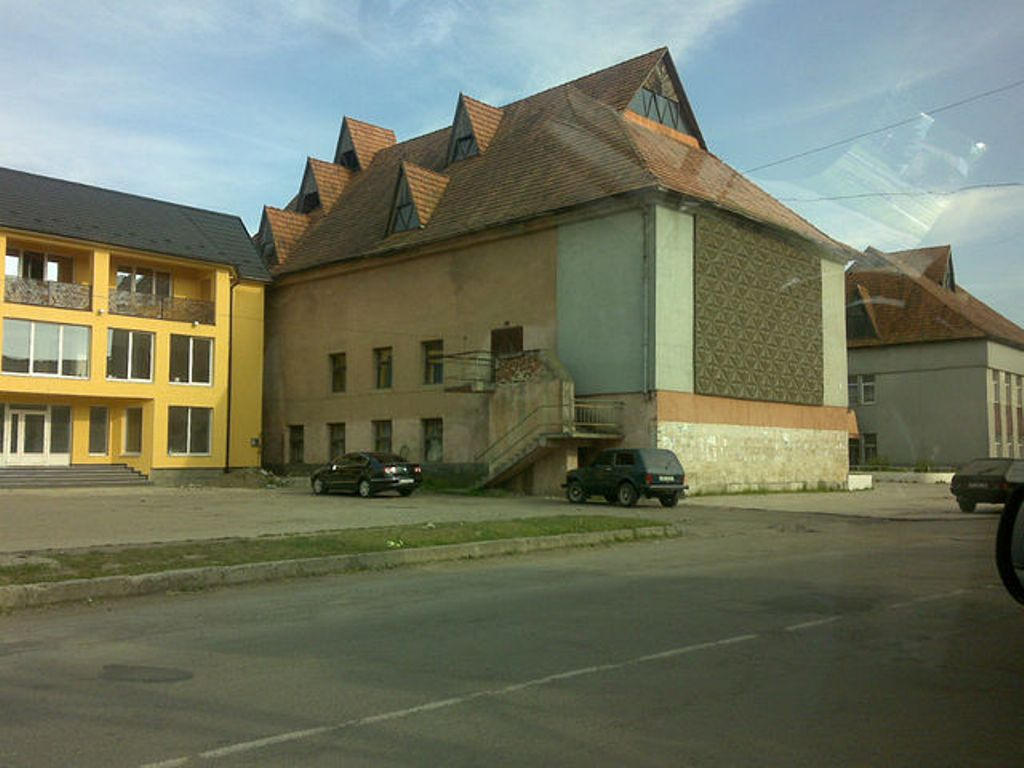
Former synagogue, now - Culture house

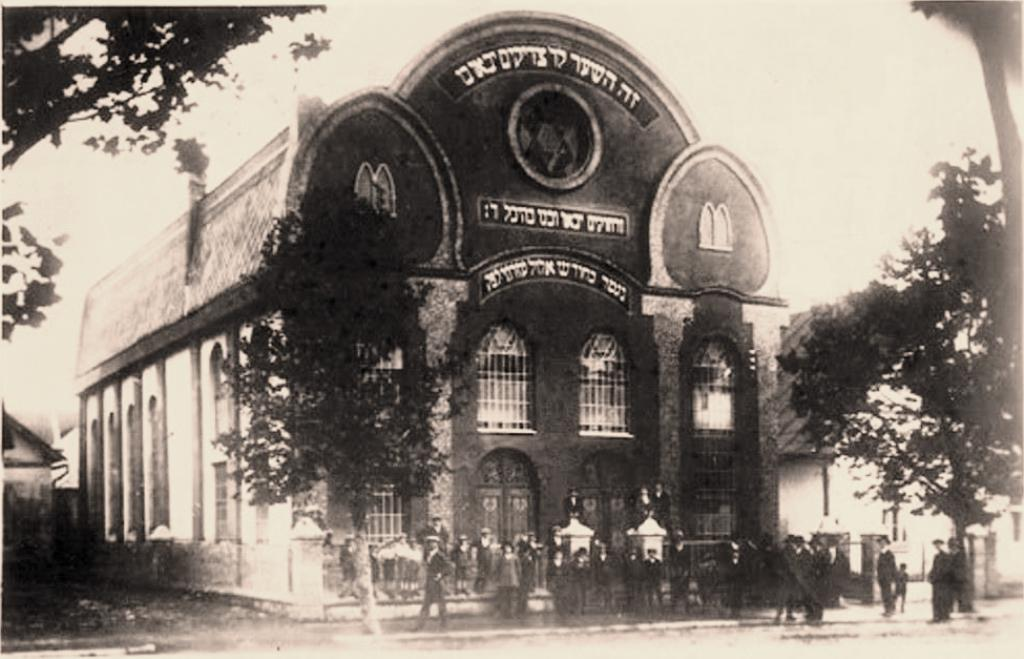
Synagogue in 1920s

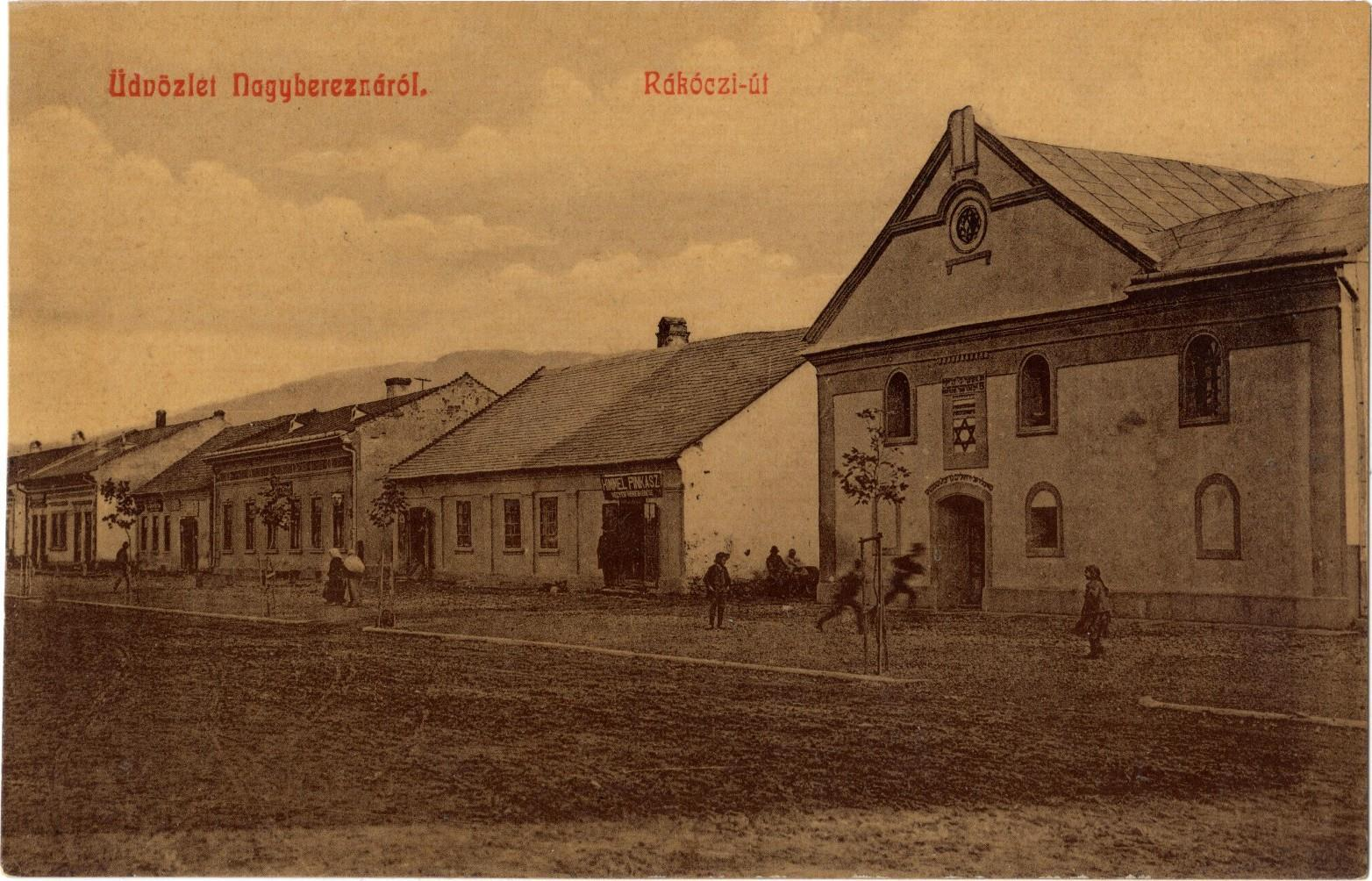
The first synagogue in Velykyi Bereznyi
