= Transcarpathian Dark-Sky Park =

Dark-sky park in Ukraine

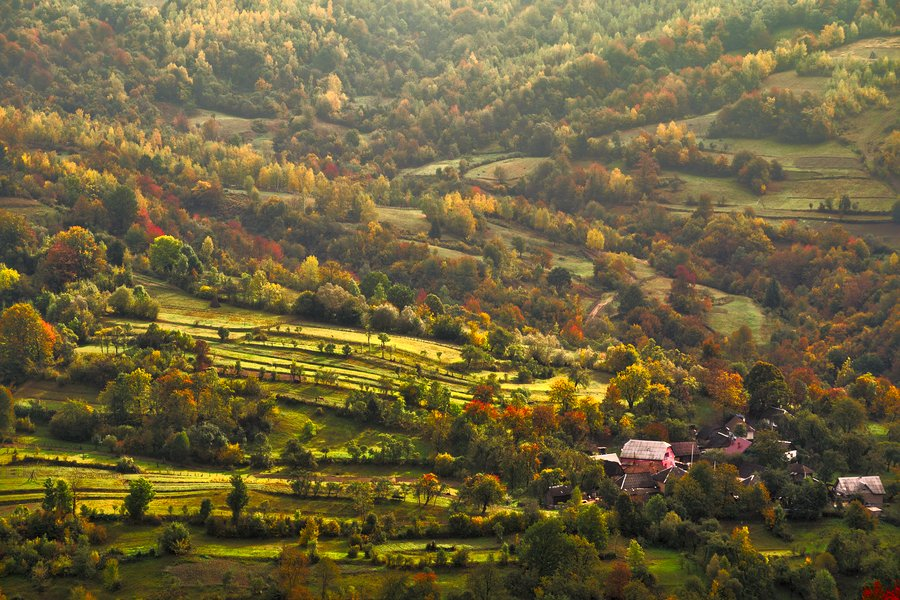
- Interactive map of Transcarpathian Dark-Sky Park
- Nearest city: Velykyi Bereznyi
- Area: 463 km^{2} (179 sq mi)
- Established: 11 June 2016

The Transcarpathian Dark-Sky Park (Ukrainian: Закарпатський парк темного неба) is a dark-sky preserve in Zakarpattia Oblast, Ukraine. It includes the area of the Uzh National Nature Park and selected areas in neighboring municipalities Sukhyi, Tykhyi, Husnyi, Lyuta, Ruskyi Mochar, and Velykyi Bereznyi. It was established in 2016 on the occasion of the 150th anniversary of the fall of the Knyahynia meteorite. It is part of the international East Carpathian Dark-Sky Tripark together with the Poloniny Dark-Sky Park in Slovakia and the Bieszczady Starry-Sky Park in Poland.
