= East Carpathian Biosphere Reserve =

Coordinates: 49°04′56″N 22°34′04″E

- IUCN category Ia (strict nature reserve)
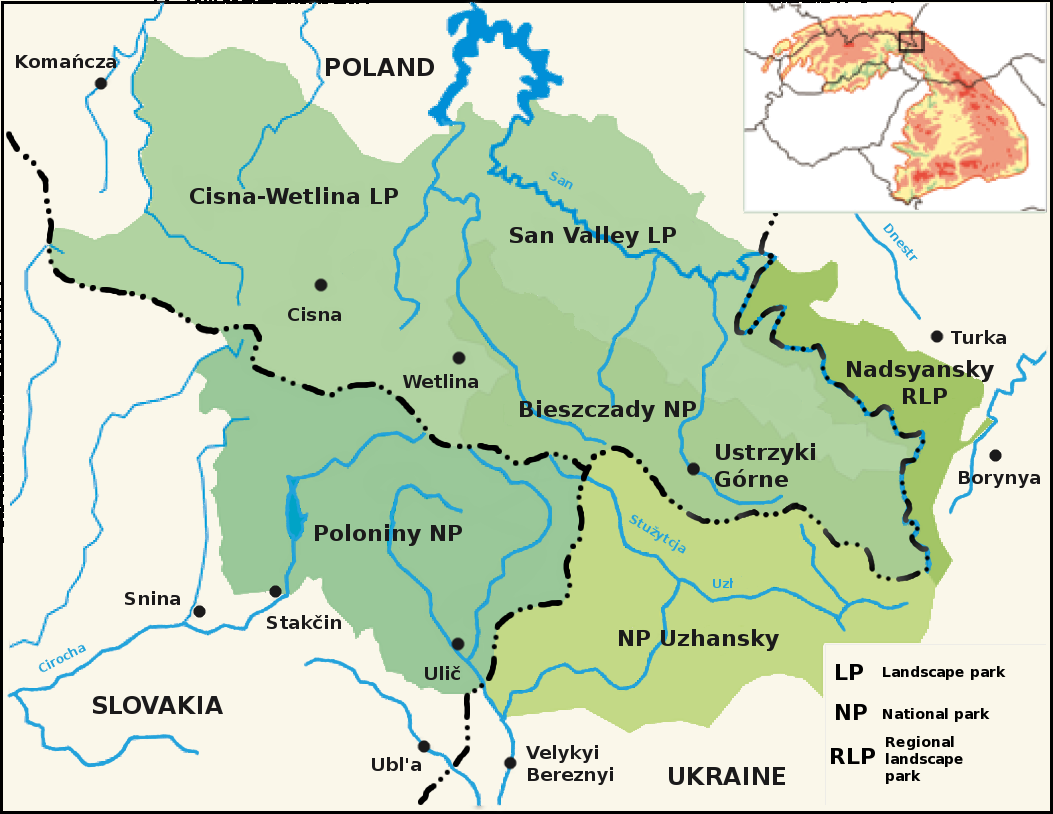
- The East Carpathian Biosphere Reserve
- Location: Central-Eastern Europe
- Area: 2,132.11 km^{2} (823.21 sq mi)
- Established: 1992

The East Carpathian Biosphere Reserve is a transboundary protected area, designated as an area of global importance under UNESCO's Programme on Man and the Biosphere.
It is located in the Eastern Carpathians and includes parts of three countries: Poland, Slovakia and Ukraine.

The Biosphere reserve covers a total area of 2,132.11 square kilometres (823.21 sq mi).

== Overview ==
The reserve was originally designated as a Polish–Slovak transboundary reserve in 1992; it was extended to include the Ukrainian part in 1998.

It includes the following national protected areas:

In Poland
Bieszczady National Park (Bieszczadzki Park Narodowy) and the two neighbouring landscape parks called Cisna-Wetlina Landscape Park (Ciśniańsko-Wetliński Park Krajobrazowy) and San Valley Landscape Park (Park Krajobrazowy Doliny Sanu);
In Slovakia
Poloniny National Park (Národný Park Poloniny) and adjacent areas;
In Ukraine
Uzh National Nature Park and Nadsianskyi Regional Landscape Park.

== See also ==
- Primeval Beech Forests of the Carpathians
