= Volosianka, Zakarpattia Oblast =

Village in Lviv Oblast, Ukraine

Volosianka Волосянка
- Village
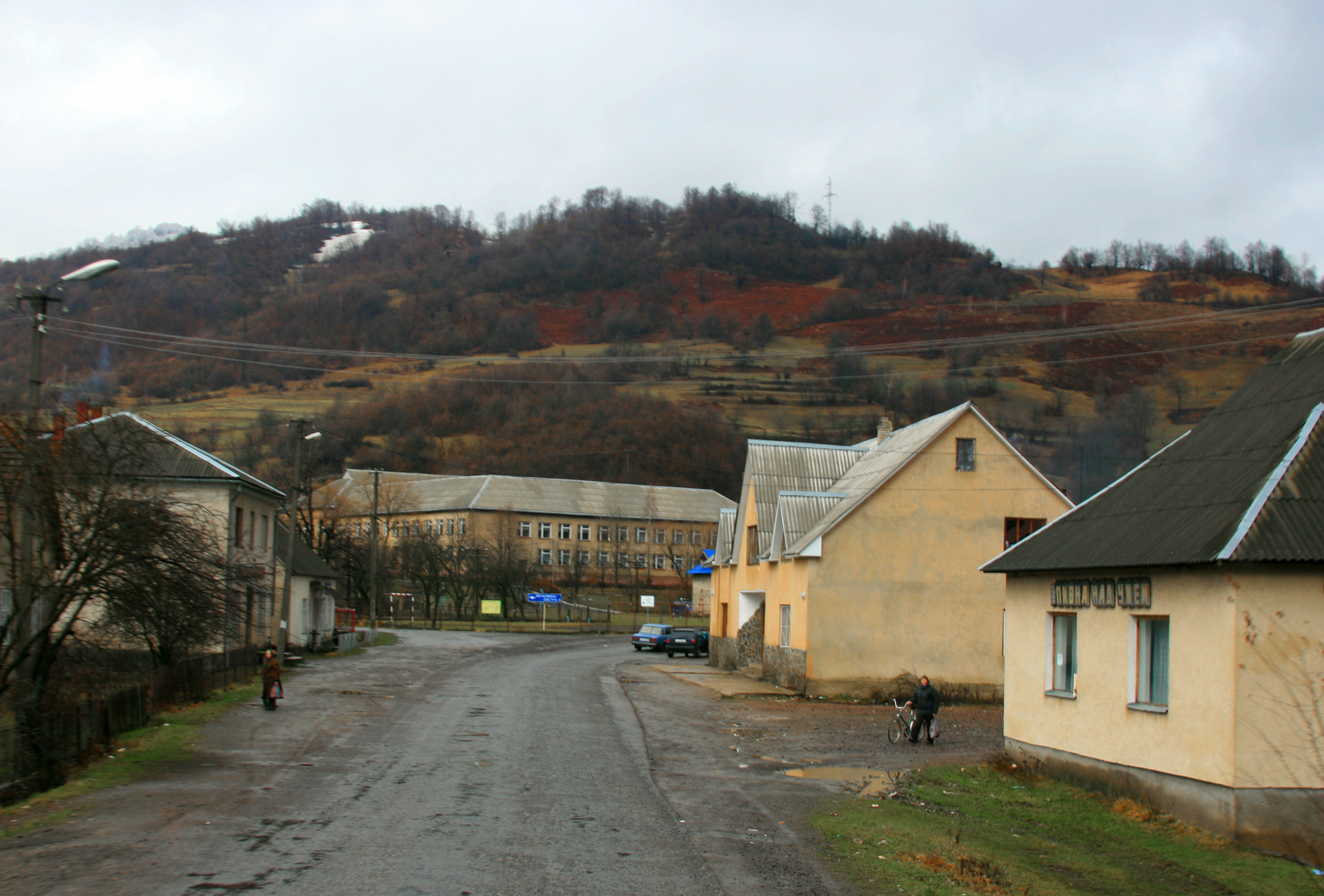
- Interactive map of Volosianka
- Location within Zakarpattia Oblast
- Coordinates: 48°58′51″N 22°48′26″E
- Country: Ukraine
- Oblast: Zakarpattia Oblast
- District: Uzhhorod Raion
- Hromada: Stavne rural hromada

Area
  - Total: 37.848 km^{2} (14.613 sq mi)
- Elevation: 481 m (1,578 ft)

Population (2001)
  - Total: 1,646
  - Density: 48,239/km^{2} (124,940/sq mi)
- Time zone: UTC+2 (EET)
  - Summer (DST): UTC+3 (EEST)
- Postal code: 89030
- Area code: +380 3135

Volosianka (Ukrainian: Волосянка) is a village (selo) in Uzhhorod Raion, Zakarpattia Oblast, of Western Ukraine. Volosianka belongs to Stavne rural hromada, one of the hromadas of Ukraine.

Until 18 July 2020, Volosianka belonged to Velykyi Bereznyi Raion. The raion was abolished in July 2020 as part of the administrative reform of Ukraine, which reduced the number of raions of Zakarpattia Oblast to six. The area of Velykyi Bereznyi Raion was merged into Uzhhorod Raion.
