= Velykyi Bereznyi Raion =

Former subdivision of Zakarpattia Oblast, Ukraine

Velykyi Bereznyi Raion Великоберезнянський район
- Raion
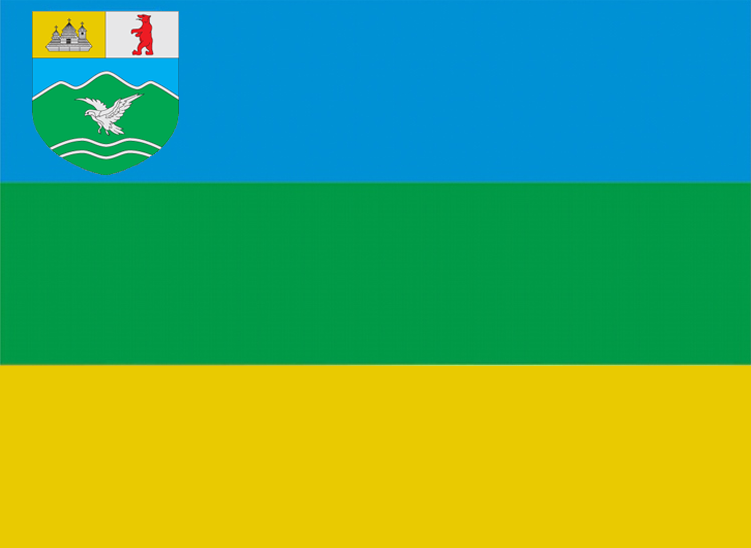
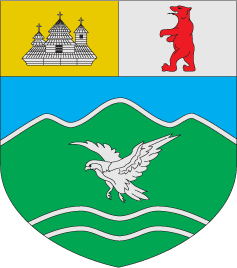
- Flag Coat of arms

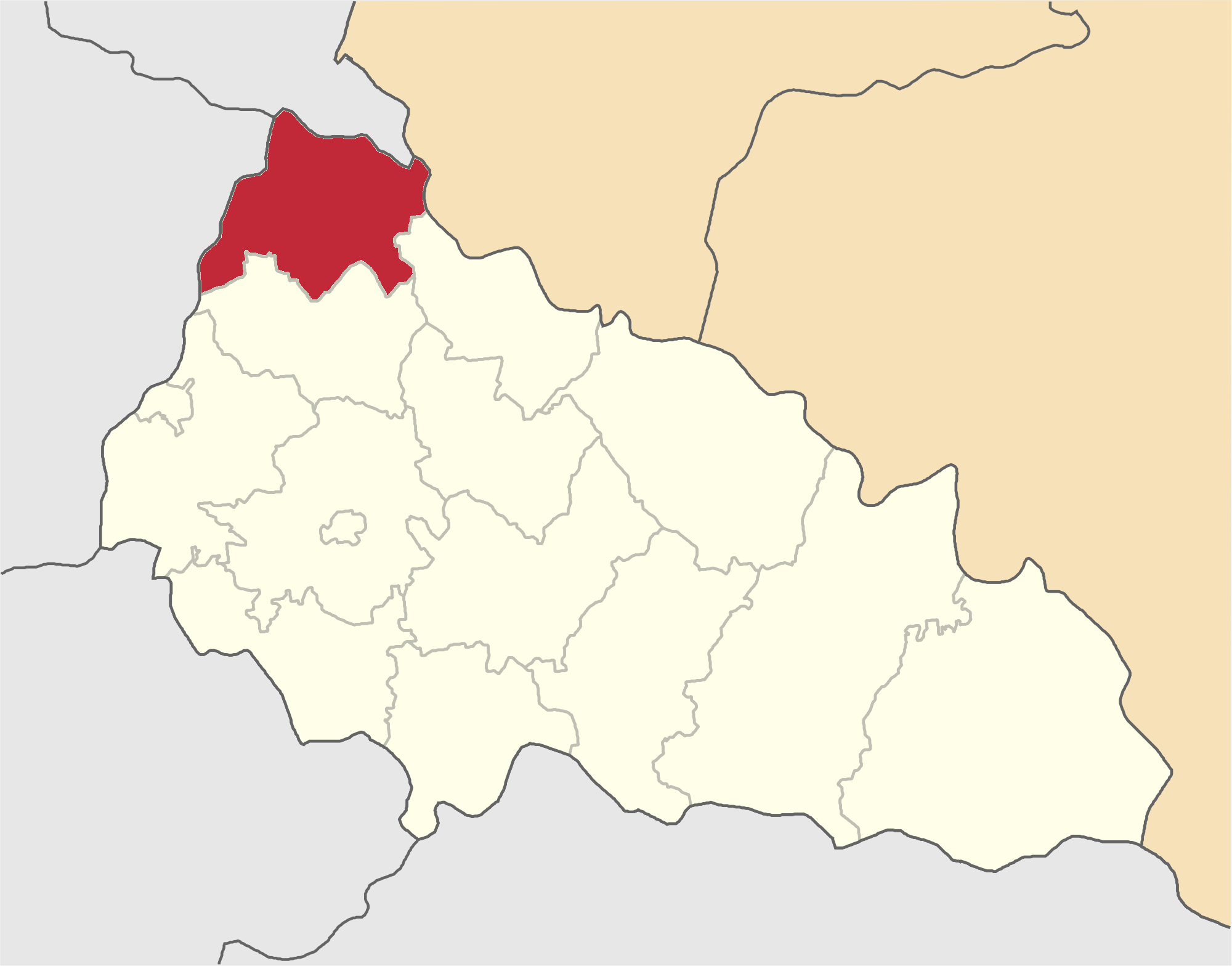
- Coordinates: 48°53′27.95″N 22°39′1.62″E
- Country: Ukraine
- Oblast: Zakarpattia Oblast
- Established: 1953
- Disestablished: 18 July 2020
- Admin. center: Velykyi Bereznyi
- Subdivisions: List: — city councils; — settlement councils; — rural councils; Number of localities: — cities; — urban-type settlements; 31 — villages; — rural settlements

Area
  - Total: 809 km^{2} (312 sq mi)

Population (2020)
  - Total: 26,060
  - Density: 32.2/km^{2} (83.4/sq mi)
- Time zone: UTC+02:00 (EET)
  - Summer (DST): UTC+03:00 (EEST)
- Area code: 380-3135
- Website: http://www.carpathia.gov.ua/

Velykyi Bereznyi Raion (Ukrainian: Великоберезнянський район) was a raion of Zakarpattia Oblast in western Ukraine. Its administrative center is the urban-type settlement of Velykyi Bereznyi. The raion was abolished and its territory was merged into Uzhhorod Raion on 18 July 2020 as part of the administrative reform of Ukraine, which reduced the number of raions of Zakarpattia Oblast to six. The last estimate of the raion population was 26,060 (2020 est.).

Settlements
Name					Coordinates
Ukrainian (transcribed)	Ukrainian	Russian	Slovak	Hungarian	Coordinates
Behendiatska Pastil	Бегендяцька Пастіль	Бегендяцкая Пастиль	Beginďatská Pastiľ, Begenďat Pastiľ	Alsópásztély, Begengyátpásztély	48.862778°N 22.506389°E
Bukivtsovo	Буківцьово	Буковцево	Bukovcová, Bukovec	Ungbükkös, Ungbukóc	48.823611°N 22.671111°E
Chornoholova	Чорноголова	Черноголова	Černohlavá, Černoholovo	Sóhát, Csernoholova	48.850833°N 22.606944°E
Domashyn	Домашин	Домашин	Domašín, Domašina	Domafalva, Domasina	48.969167°N 22.551944°E
Husnyi	Гусний	Гусный	Husný, Husna	Erdőludas, Huszna	48.942778°N 22.852222°E
Kniahynia	Княгиня	Княгиня	Kňahynín, Kňahinina	Csillagfalva, Knyahina	48.976111°N 22.516111°E
Kosteva Pastil	Костева Пастіль	Костева Пастиль	Kosťova Pastiľ, Kosťeva Pastiľ	Nagypásztély, Kosztovapásztély	48.855278°N 22.550556°E
Kostryna	Кострина	Кострина	Kostrina, Kostriny	Csontos	48.943056°N 22.59°E
Kostrynska Roztoka	Костринська Розтока	Костринская Розтока	Roztoka	Rosztoka	48.937778°N 22.625278°E
Lubnia	Лубня	Лубня	Lubňa, Lubno	Kiesvölgy, Lubnya	49.025833°N 22.721389°E
Luh	Луг	Луг	Luh	Ligetes, Luh	48.9825°N 22.778889°E
Liuta	Люта	Люта	Ľutá, Ľuta	Havasköz	48.898056°N 22.776111°E
Malyi Bereznyi	Малий Березний	Малый Березный	Malý Berezný, Malé Berezné	Kisberezna	48.864167°N 22.442778°E
Myrcha	Мирча	Мирча	Mirča	Mércse, Mircse	48.826667°N 22.461389°E
Roztotska Pastil	Розтоцька Пастіль	Розтокская Пастиль	Roztocká Pastiľ, Roztoka Pastiľ	Felsőpásztély, Rosztokapásztély	48.876111°N 22.528611°E
Ruskyi Mochar	Руський Мочар	Русский Мочар	Močár, Ruský Močar	Oroszmocsár	48.898889°N 22.528056°E
Sil	Сіль	Соль	Soľ, Soľa	Sóslak	48.9525°N 22.521389°E
Smerekovo	Смереково	Смерекова	Smrková, Smerekova	Szemerekő, Szmerekova	48.801944°N 22.636944°E
Stavne	Ставне	Ставное	Stavné, Stavná	Fenyvesvölgy	48.986667°N 22.704444°E
Strychava	Стричава	Стричава	Stričava	Eszterág, Sztricsava	48.961944°N 22.491389°E
Stuzhytsia	Стужиця	Стужица	Stará Stužica + Nová Stužica	Patakófalu + Patakújfalu, Ósztuzsica + Újsztuzsica	49.023611°N 22.611667°E
Sukhyi	Сухий	Сухой	Suchý, Suchá	Szuhapatak, Ungszuha	48.949167°N 22.79°E
Tykhyi	Тихий	Тихий	Tichý, Tichá	Tiha	48.920278°N 22.826111°E
Uzhok	Ужок	Ужок	Užok	Uzsok	48.984722°N 22.864722°E
Verhovyna-Bystra	Верховина-Бистра	Верховина-Быстрая	Bystrý, Bystrá Verchovina	Határszög, Verhovinabisztra	49.0125°N 22.773889°E
Vyshka	Вишка	Вышка	Vyšká, Viška	Viharos, Viska	48.938611°N 22.709167°E
Volosyanka	Волосянка	Волосянка	Volosianka, Volosanka	Hajasd	48.980833°N 22.807222°E
Zabrid	Забрідь	Забродь	Zábroď	Révhely, Zábrogy	48.923333°N 22.461667°E
Zahorb	Загорб	Загорб	Záhorb	Határhegy	49.013333°N 22.662778°E
Zavosyna	Завосина	Завосина	Zavosina, Zausina	Szénástelek, Zauszina	48.852778°N 22.393889°E
Zhornava	Жорнава	Жорнава	Žornavý, Žornava	Malomrét	48.990833°N 22.637222°E

== See also ==
- Administrative divisions of Zakarpattia Oblast
