= Hostovice =

Hostovice may refer to several places in Czech Republic and Slovakia.

- Hostovice, part of city Pardubice, Czech Republic
- Hostovice, Snina District, Slovakia
