= Hostovice (Pardubice) =

- village, municipal part of the Czech Republic, self-governing city district in Czechia, cadastral area in the Czech Republic
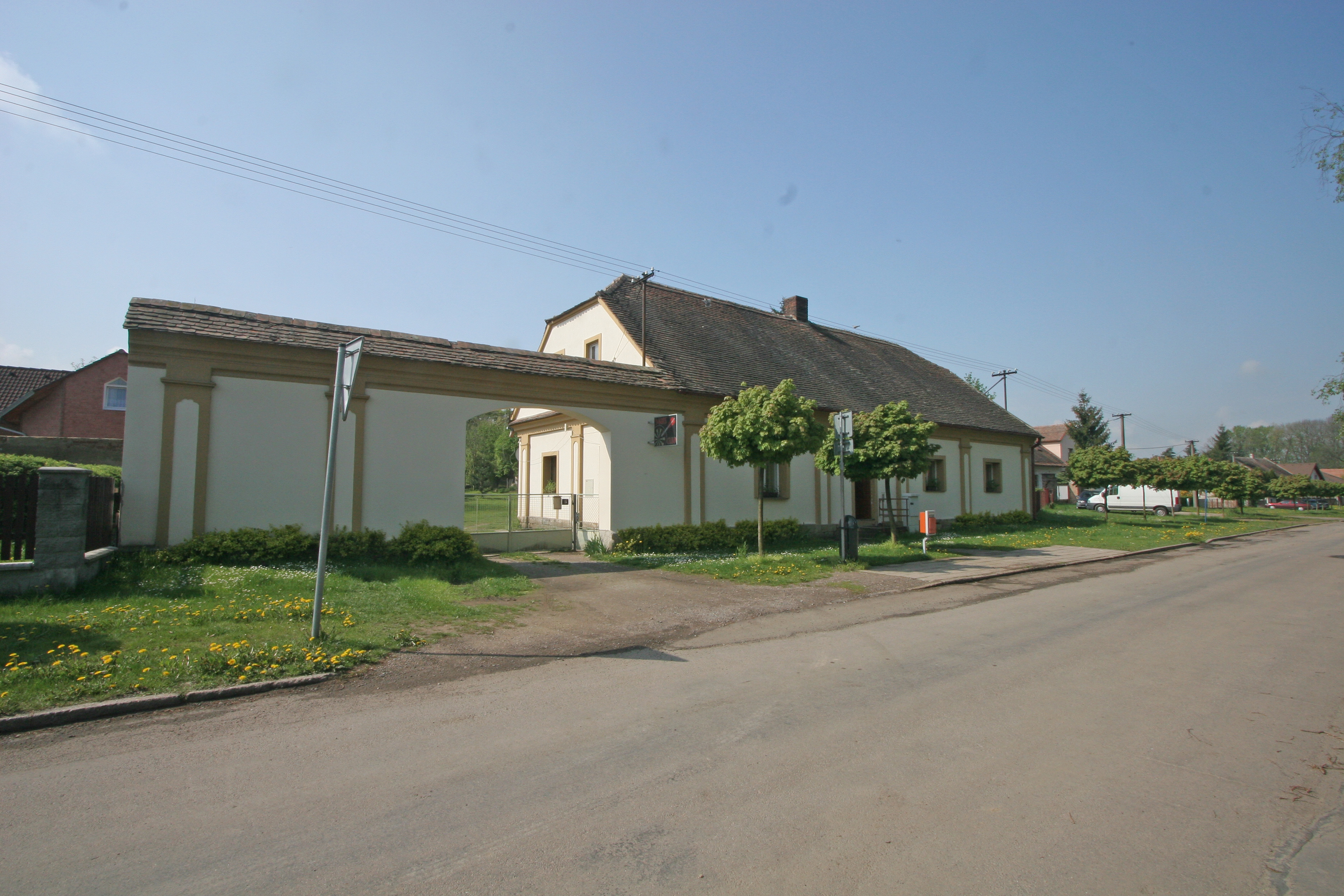

- Coordinates: 50°00′12″N 15°51′57″E
- Country: Czech Republic

Area
  - Total: 4.948 km^{2} (1.910 sq mi)

Population (26 March 2021)
  - Total: 275
  - Density: 56/km^{2} (140/sq mi)

Hostovice is a village in the Pardubice Region of the Czech Republic, since 2006 a part of Pardubice municipality. It has roughly 240 inhabitants.
