= Hýľov =

Village and municipality in Slovakia

Hýľov Hilyó
- Municipality
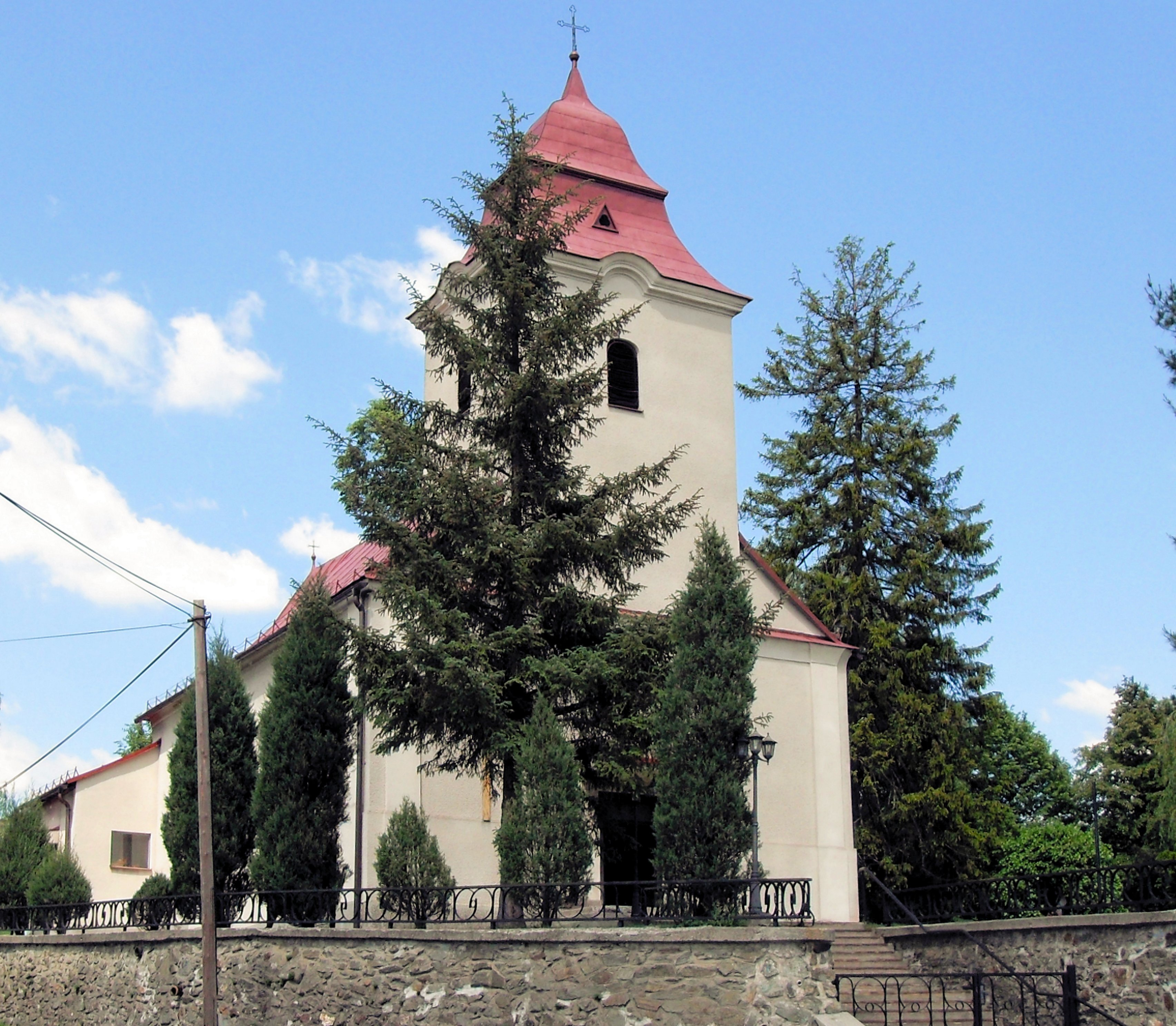

- Flag

- Location of Hýľov in the Košice Region Location of Hýľov in Slovakia
- Coordinates: 48.73°N 21.12°E
- Country: Slovakia
- Region: Košice Region
- District: Košice-okolie District
- First mentioned: 1318

Area
  - Total: 23.88 km^{2} (9.22 sq mi)
- Elevation: 480 m (1,570 ft)

Population (2025)
  - Total: 556
- Time zone: UTC+1 (CET)
  - Summer (DST): UTC+2 (CEST)
- Postal code: 441 2
- Area code: +421 55
- Vehicle registration plate (until 2022): KS
- Website: www.obechylov.sk

Hýľov (Hungarian: Hilyó) is a village and municipality in Košice-okolie District in the Kosice Region of eastern Slovakia.

== History ==
In historical records the village was first mentioned in 1318.

== Geography ==
The municipality lies at an altitude of 480 metres (1,570 ft) and covers an area of 23.88 km^{2} (9.22 sq mi) (2025).

== Population ==
Population statistic (10 years)
Year	1995	2005	2015	2025
Count	412	445	507	556
Difference		+8.00%	+13.93%	+9.66%

Population statistic
Year	2024	2025
Count	558	556
Difference		−0.35%

It has a population of 556 people (31 December 2025).

=== Ethnicity ===
Census 2021 (1+ %)
Ethnicity	Number	Fraction
Slovak	504	98.43%
Not found out	6	1.17%
Total	512	

In year 2021 was 512 people by ethnicity 504 as Slovak, 6 as Not found out, 3 as Czech, 2 as Rusyn, 2 as Hungarian, 2 as Other, 1 as Italian and 1 as Russian.

Note on population: The difference values of population numbers in the table "Population statistic" and in the sections "Ethnicity" & "Religion" is caused by the use of various statistical methods.

=== Religion ===
Census 2021 (1+ %)
Religion	Number	Fraction
Roman Catholic Church	441	86.13%
None	53	10.35%
Greek Catholic Church	7	1.37%
Total	512	

In year 2021 was 512 people by religion 441 from Roman Catholic Church, 53 from None, 7 from Greek Catholic Church, 4 from Not found out, 2 from Apostolic Church, 1 from Calvinist Church, 1 from Christian Congregations in Slovakia, 1 from Other, 1 from Evangelical Church and 1 from Buddhism.

== Genealogical resources ==
The records for genealogical research are available at the state archive "Statny Archiv in Kosice, Levoca,

Slovakia"

- Roman Catholic church records (births/marriages/deaths): 1736-1896 (parish A)
- Greek Catholic church records (births/marriages/deaths): 1727-1911 (parish B)

== See also ==
- List of municipalities and towns in Slovakia
