= Beniakovce =

Village in Slovakia

Beniakovce Benyék
- Municipality
- Flag

- Location of Beniakovce in the Košice Region Location of Beniakovce in Slovakia
- Coordinates: 48.77°N 21.32°E
- Country: Slovakia
- Region: Košice Region
- District: Košice-okolie District
- First mentioned: 1379

Area
  - Total: 3.78 km^{2} (1.46 sq mi)
- Elevation: 203 m (666 ft)

Population (2025)
  - Total: 901
- Time zone: UTC+1 (CET)
  - Summer (DST): UTC+2 (CEST)
- Postal code: 444 2
- Area code: +421 55
- Vehicle registration plate (until 2022): KS
- Website: www.obecbeniakovce.sk

Beniakovce (Slovak pronunciation: [ˈbeɲɪɐkɔwtse]; Hungarian: Benyék) is a village and municipality in Košice-okolie District in the Kosice Region of Slovakia.

It arose after 1877 by a merge of the municipalities Stredná Belža, Šándorova Belža and Vyšná Belža.

== Geography ==
The municipality lies at an altitude of 203 metres (666 ft) and covers an area of 3.78 km^{2} (1.46 sq mi) (2025).

== Population ==
Population statistic (10 years)
Year	1995	2005	2015	2025
Count	527	563	679	901
Difference		+6.83%	+20.60%	+32.69%

Population statistic
Year	2024	2025
Count	873	901
Difference		+3.20%

It has a population of 901 people (31 December 2025).

=== Ethnicity ===
Census 2021 (1+ %)
Ethnicity	Number	Fraction
Slovak	759	96.68%
Not found out	18	2.29%
Romani	11	1.4%
Hungarian	8	1.01%
Total	785	

In year 2021 was 785 people by ethnicity 759 as Slovak, 18 as Not found out, 11 as Romani, 8 as Hungarian, 7 as Czech, 5 as Other, 3 as Ukrainian, 3 as Rusyn, 2 as Italian, 2 as Iranian, 1 as Austrian, 1 as German, 1 as Croatian and 1 as English.

Note on population: The difference values of population numbers in the table "Population statistic" and in the sections "Ethnicity" & "Religion" is caused by the use of various statistical methods.

=== Religion ===
Census 2021 (1+ %)
Religion	Number	Fraction
Roman Catholic Church	433	55.16%
Evangelical Church	114	14.52%
None	96	12.23%
Calvinist Church	46	5.86%
Greek Catholic Church	43	5.48%
Christian Congregations in Slovakia	20	2.55%
Not found out	15	1.91%
Total	785	

In year 2021 was 785 people by religion 433 from Roman Catholic Church, 114 from Evangelical Church, 96 from None, 46 from Calvinist Church, 43 from Greek Catholic Church, 20 from Christian Congregations in Slovakia, 15 from Not found out, 6 from Eastern Orthodox Church, 5 from Apostolic Church, 3 from Ad hoc movements, 1 from Islam, 1 from Other, 1 from United Methodist Church and 1 from Baptists Church.

== Genealogical resources ==
The records for genealogical research are available at the state archive "Statny Archiv in Kosice, Slovakia"

- Roman Catholic church records (births/marriages/deaths): 1834-1896 (parish B)
- Greek Catholic church records (births/marriages/deaths): 1819-1898 (parish B)
- Lutheran church records (births/marriages/deaths): 1749-1894 (parish B)
- Reformated church records (births/marriages/deaths): 1753-1896 (parish B)

== See also ==
- List of municipalities and towns in Slovakia
