= Bunetice =

Village and municipality in Slovakia

Bunetice Bunyita
- Municipality
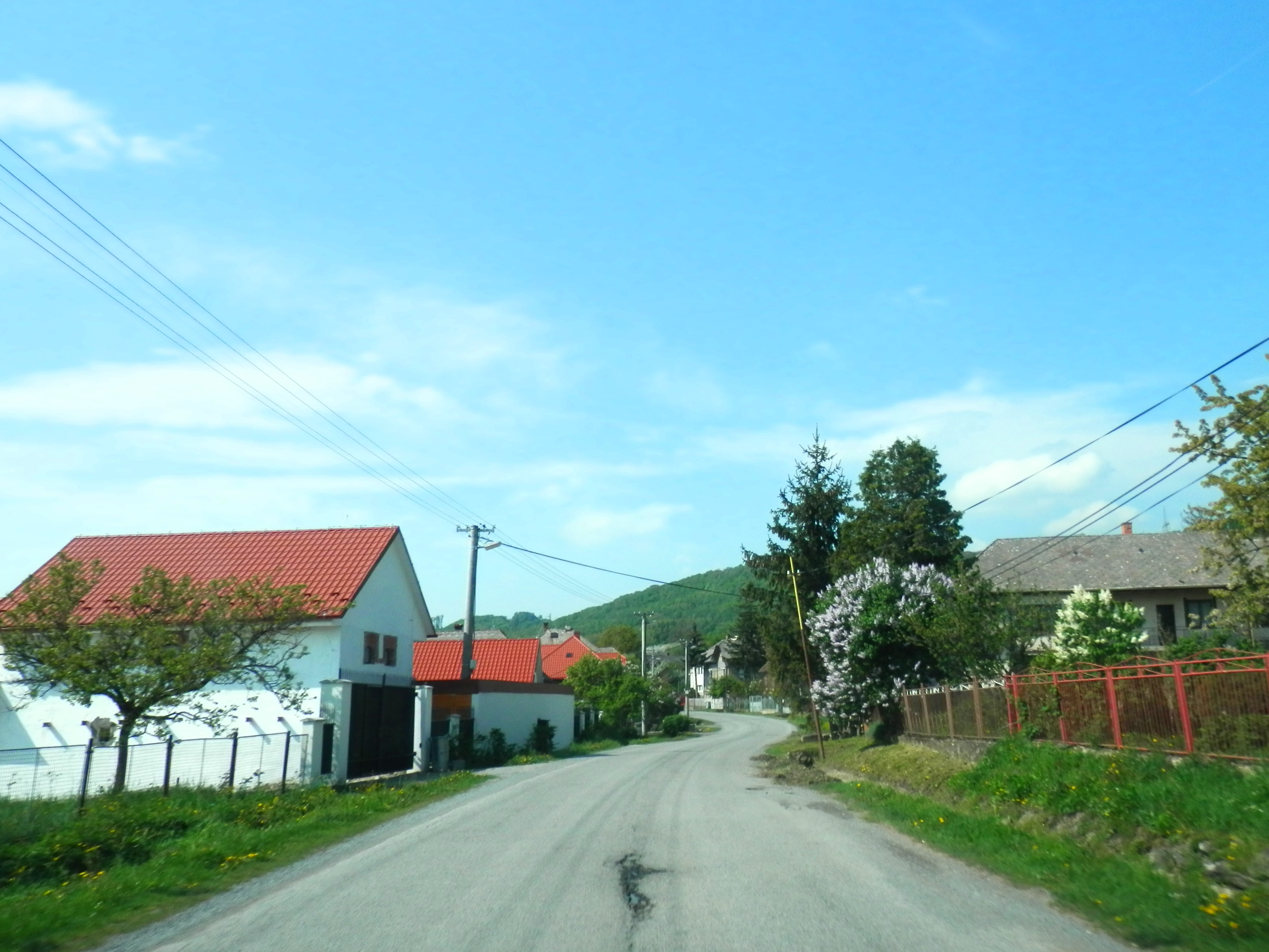

- Flag

- Location of Bunetice in the Košice Region Location of Bunetice in Slovakia
- Coordinates: 48.87°N 21.40°E
- Country: Slovakia
- Region: Košice Region
- District: Košice-okolie District
- First mentioned: 1427

Area
  - Total: 8.35 km^{2} (3.22 sq mi)
- Elevation: 412 m (1,352 ft)

Population (2025)
  - Total: 95
- Time zone: UTC+1 (CET)
  - Summer (DST): UTC+2 (CEST)
- Postal code: 444 7
- Area code: +421 55
- Vehicle registration plate (until 2022): KS
- Website: bunetice.webnode.sk

Bunetice (Hungarian: Bunyita) is a village and municipality in Košice-okolie District in the Kosice Region of eastern Slovakia.

== Geography ==
The municipality lies at an altitude of 412 metres (1,352 ft) and covers an area of 8.35 km^{2} (3.22 sq mi) (2025).

== Population ==
Population statistic (10 years)
Year	1995	2005	2015	2025
Count	109	96	91	95
Difference		−11.92%	−5.20%	+4.39%

Population statistic
Year	2024	2025
Count	93	95
Difference		+2.15%

It has a population of 95 people (31 December 2025).

=== Ethnicity ===
Census 2021 (1+ %)
Ethnicity	Number	Fraction
Slovak	87	97.75%
Other	4	4.49%
Not found out	2	2.24%
Italian	1	1.12%
Rusyn	1	1.12%
Total	89	

In year 2021 was 89 people by ethnicity 87 as Slovak, 4 as Other, 2 as Not found out, 1 as Italian and 1 as Rusyn.

Note on population: The difference values of population numbers in the table "Population statistic" and in the sections "Ethnicity" & "Religion" is caused by the use of various statistical methods.

=== Religion ===
Census 2021 (1+ %)
Religion	Number	Fraction
Roman Catholic Church	62	69.66%
Evangelical Church	11	12.36%
None	8	8.99%
Jehovah's Witnesses	3	3.37%
Greek Catholic Church	2	2.25%
Paganism and natural spirituality	1	1.12%
Not found out	1	1.12%
Christian Congregations in Slovakia	1	1.12%
Total	89	

In year 2021 was 89 people by religion 62 from Roman Catholic Church, 11 from Evangelical Church, 8 from None, 3 from Jehovah's Witnesses, 2 from Greek Catholic Church, 1 from Paganism and natural spirituality, 1 from Not found out and 1 from Christian Congregations in Slovakia.

== Genealogical resources ==
The records for genealogical research are available at the state archive "Statny Archiv in Kosice, Presov, Slovakia"

- Roman Catholic church records (births/marriages/deaths): 1755-1895 (parish B)
- Greek Catholic church records (births/marriages/deaths): 1773-1895 (parish B)
- Lutheran church records (births/marriages/deaths): 1784-1895 (parish B)

== See also ==
- List of municipalities and towns in Slovakia
