= Opátka =

Village and municipality in Slovakia

Opátka Apátka
- Municipality
- Flag

- Location of Opátka in the Košice Region Location of Opátka in Slovakia
- Coordinates: 48.78°N 21.07°E
- Country: Slovakia
- Region: Košice Region
- District: Košice-okolie District
- First mentioned: 1445

Area
  - Total: 13.90 km^{2} (5.37 sq mi)
- Elevation: 462 m (1,516 ft)

Population (2025)
  - Total: 108
- Time zone: UTC+1 (CET)
  - Summer (DST): UTC+2 (CEST)
- Postal code: 446 5
- Area code: +421 55
- Vehicle registration plate (until 2022): KS
- Website: www.opatka.sk

Opátka (Hungarian: Apátka) is a village and municipality in Košice-okolie District in the Kosice Region of eastern Slovakia.

== History ==
In historical records the village was first mentioned in 1445.

== Geography ==
The municipality lies at an altitude of 462 metres (1,516 ft) and covers an area of 13.90 km^{2} (5.37 sq mi) (2025).

== Population ==
Population statistic (10 years)
Year	1995	2005	2015	2025
Count	92	78	92	108
Difference		−15.21%	+17.94%	+17.39%

Population statistic
Year	2024	2025
Count	110	108
Difference		−1.81%

It has a population of 108 people (31 December 2025).

=== Ethnicity ===
Census 2021 (1+ %)
Ethnicity	Number	Fraction
Slovak	100	97.08%
Not found out	4	3.88%
Total	103	

In year 2021 was 103 people by ethnicity 100 as Slovak, 4 as Not found out, 1 as Czech and 1 as Other.

Note on population: The difference values of population numbers in the table "Population statistic" and in the sections "Ethnicity" & "Religion" is caused by the use of various statistical methods.

=== Religion ===
Census 2021 (1+ %)
Religion	Number	Fraction
Roman Catholic Church	74	71.84%
None	16	15.53%
Apostolic Church	5	4.85%
Not found out	3	2.91%
Evangelical Church	3	2.91%
Total	103	

In year 2021 was 103 people by religion 74 from Roman Catholic Church, 16 from None, 5 from Apostolic Church, 3 from Not found out, 3 from Evangelical Church, 1 from Other and 1 from Ad hoc movements.

== Culture ==
The village has a small public library and a general store.
