= Mudrovce =

Mudrovce Modrafalva
- Municipality
- Flag

- Location of Mudrovce in the Košice Region Location of Mudrovce in Slovakia
- Coordinates: 48.83°N 21.45°E
- Country: Slovakia
- Region: Košice Region
- District: Košice-okolie District
- First mentioned: 1406

Area
  - Total: 5.88 km^{2} (2.27 sq mi)
- Elevation: 416 m (1,365 ft)

Population (2025)
  - Total: 61
- Time zone: UTC+1 (CET)
  - Summer (DST): UTC+2 (CEST)
- Postal code: 444 7
- Area code: +421 55
- Vehicle registration plate (until 2022): KS
- Website: www.mudrovce.sk

Mudrovce (Slovak pronunciation: [ˈmudrɔwtse]; Hungarian: Modrafalva) is a village and municipality in Košice-okolie District in the Kosice Region of eastern Slovakia.

== History ==
In historical records the village was first mentioned in 1406.

== Geography ==
The municipality lies at an altitude of 416 metres (1,365 ft) and covers an area of 5.88 km^{2} (2.27 sq mi) (2025).

== Population ==
Population statistic (10 years)
Year	1995	2005	2015	2025
Count	76	78	72	61
Difference		+2.63%	−7.69%	−15.27%

Population statistic
Year	2024	2025
Count	64	61
Difference		−4.68%

It has a population of 61 people (31 December 2025).

=== Ethnicity ===
Census 2021 (1+ %)
Ethnicity	Number	Fraction
Slovak	60	92.3%
Not found out	4	6.15%
Czech	1	1.53%
Rusyn	1	1.53%
Total	65	

In year 2021 was 65 people by ethnicity 60 as Slovak, 4 as Not found out, 1 as Czech and 1 as Rusyn.

Note on population: The difference values of population numbers in the table "Population statistic" and in the sections "Ethnicity" & "Religion" is caused by the use of various statistical methods.

=== Religion ===
Census 2021 (1+ %)
Religion	Number	Fraction
Evangelical Church	26	40%
None	17	26.15%
Roman Catholic Church	13	20%
Not found out	3	4.62%
Calvinist Church	2	3.08%
Other	2	3.08%
Greek Catholic Church	1	1.54%
United Methodist Church	1	1.54%
Total	65	

In year 2021 was 65 people by religion 26 from Evangelical Church, 17 from None, 13 from Roman Catholic Church, 3 from Not found out, 2 from Calvinist Church, 2 from Other, 1 from Greek Catholic Church and 1 from United Methodist Church.
