= Košický Klečenov =

Village and municipality in Slovakia

Košický Klečenov Kelecsenyborda
- Municipality
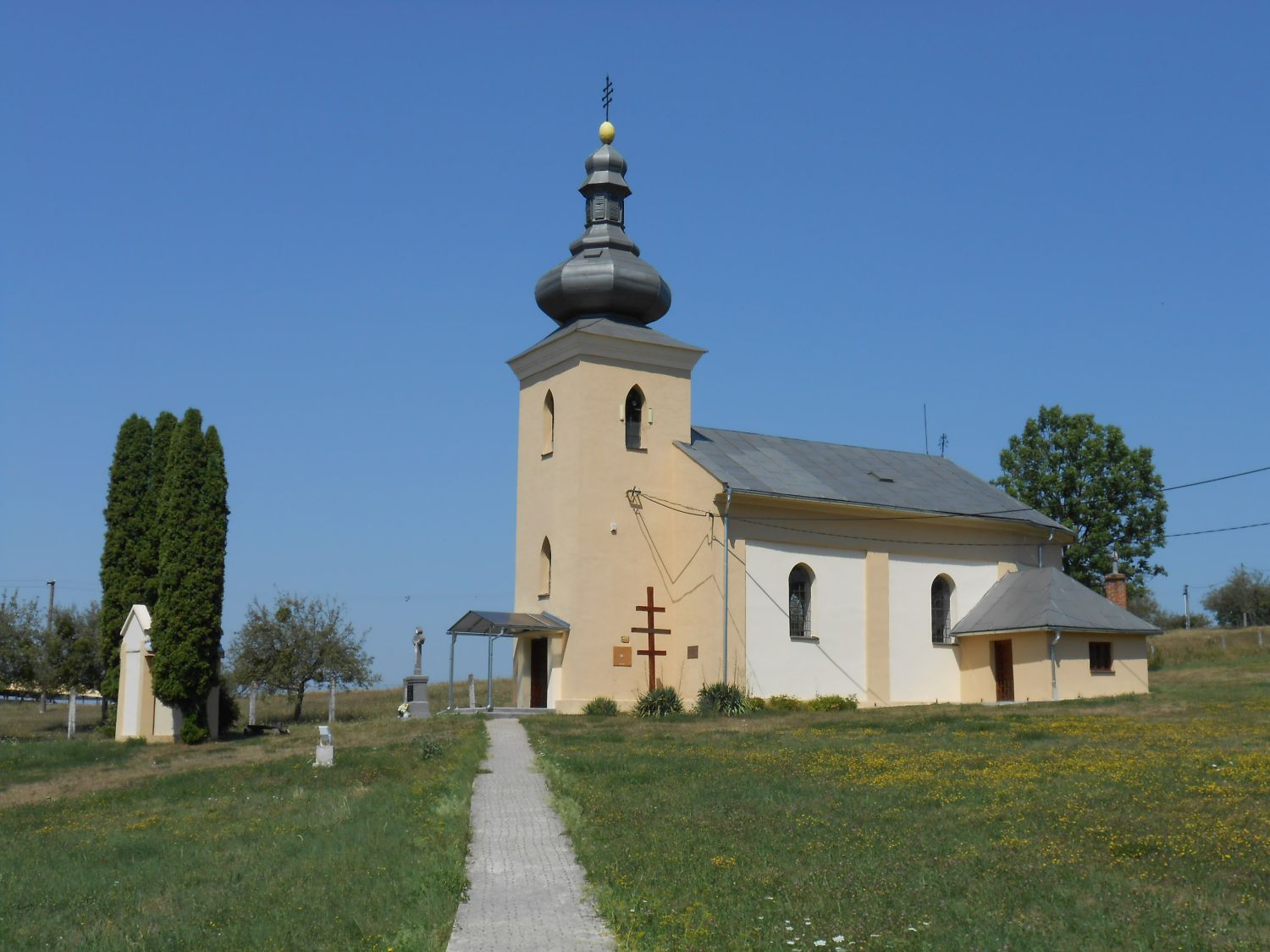

- Flag

- Location of Košický Klečenov in the Košice Region Location of Košický Klečenov in Slovakia
- Coordinates: 48.75°N 21.52°E
- Country: Slovakia
- Region: Košice Region
- District: Košice-okolie District
- First mentioned: 1427

Area
  - Total: 13.40 km^{2} (5.17 sq mi)
- Elevation: 342 m (1,122 ft)

Population (2025)
  - Total: 312
- Time zone: UTC+1 (CET)
  - Summer (DST): UTC+2 (CEST)
- Postal code: 444 5
- Area code: +421 55
- Vehicle registration plate (until 2022): KS
- Website: www.kosickyklecenov.sk

Košický Klečenov (Slovak pronunciation: [ˈkɔʂitskiː ˈkletʂenɔw]; Hungarian: Kelecsenyborda) is a village and municipality in Košice-okolie District in the Kosice Region of eastern Slovakia.

== History ==
In historical records the village was first mentioned in 1427.

== Geography ==
The municipality lies at an altitude of 342 metres (1,122 ft) and covers an area of 13.40 km^{2} (5.17 sq mi) (2025).

== Population ==
Population statistic (10 years)
Year	1995	2005	2015	2025
Count	219	263	280	312
Difference		+20.09%	+6.46%	+11.42%

Population statistic
Year	2024	2025
Count	309	312
Difference		+0.97%

It has a population of 312 people (31 December 2025).

=== Ethnicity ===
Census 2021 (1+ %)
Ethnicity	Number	Fraction
Slovak	286	96.62%
Not found out	10	3.37%
Total	296	

In year 2021 was 296 people by ethnicity 286 as Slovak, 10 as Not found out, 2 as Hungarian, 1 as Czech, 1 as Rusyn and 1 as Other.

Note on population: The difference values of population numbers in the table "Population statistic" and in the sections "Ethnicity" & "Religion" is caused by the use of various statistical methods.

=== Religion ===
Census 2021 (1+ %)
Religion	Number	Fraction
Roman Catholic Church	114	38.51%
Greek Catholic Church	112	37.84%
None	43	14.53%
Not found out	12	4.05%
Evangelical Church	10	3.38%
Calvinist Church	3	1.01%
Total	296	

In year 2021 was 296 people by religion 114 from Roman Catholic Church, 112 from Greek Catholic Church, 43 from None, 12 from Not found out, 10 from Evangelical Church, 3 from Calvinist Church, 1 from Christian Congregations in Slovakia and 1 from Ad hoc movements.

== Genealogical resources ==
The records for genealogical research are available at the state archive "Statny Archiv in Kosice, Slovakia"

- Roman Catholic church records (births/marriages/deaths): 1789-1918 (parish B)
- Greek Catholic church records (births/marriages/deaths): 1788-1912 (parish A)

== See also ==
- List of municipalities and towns in Slovakia
