= Malá Lodina =

Malá Lodina Kisladna
- Municipality
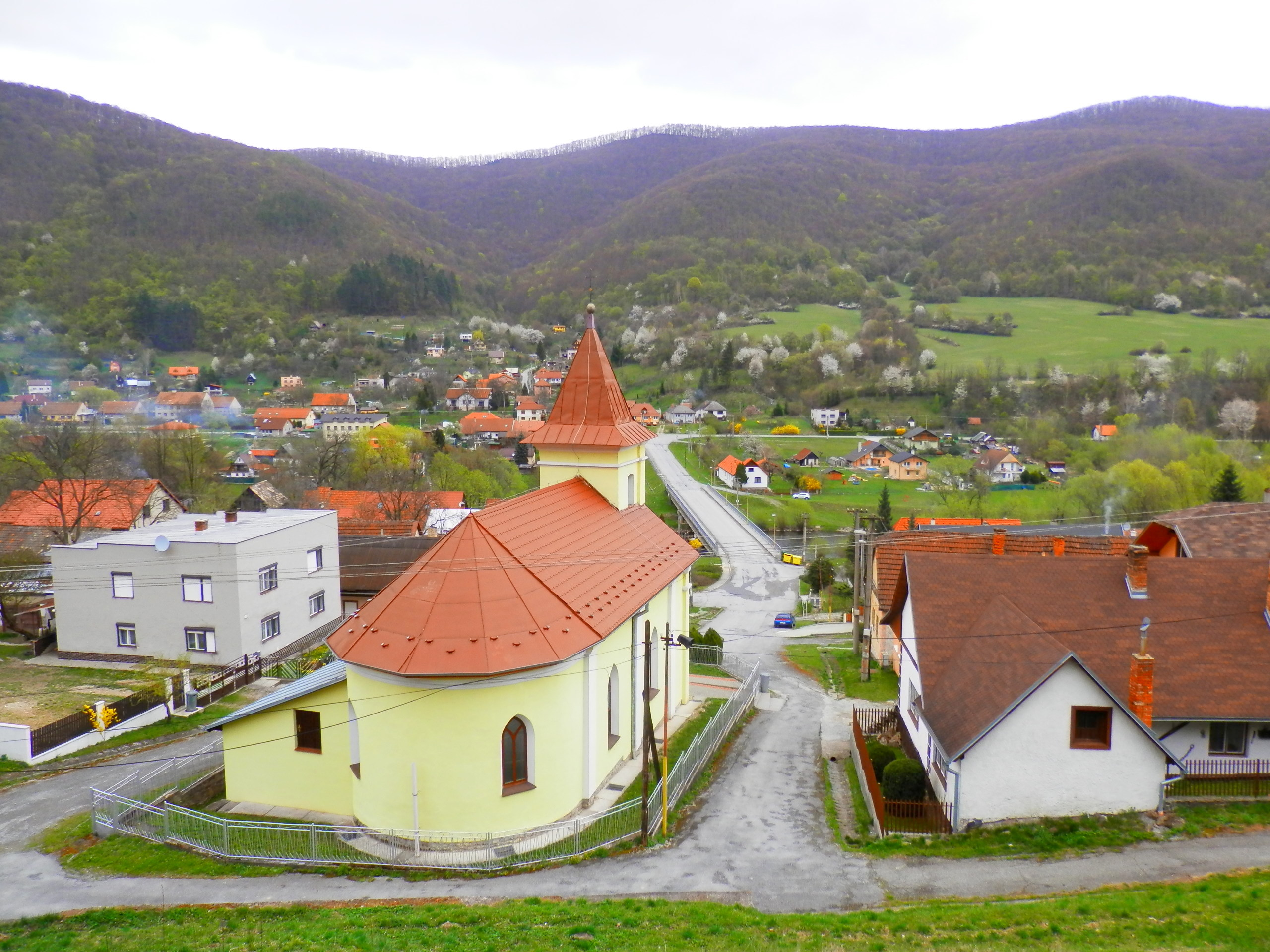

- Flag

- Location of Malá Lodina in the Košice Region Location of Malá Lodina in Slovakia
- Coordinates: 48.88°N 21.13°E
- Country: Slovakia
- Region: Košice Region
- District: Košice-okolie District
- First mentioned: 1386

Area
  - Total: 38.34 km^{2} (14.80 sq mi)
- Elevation: 262 m (860 ft)

Population (2025)
  - Total: 219
- Time zone: UTC+1 (CET)
  - Summer (DST): UTC+2 (CEST)
- Postal code: 443 2
- Area code: +421 55
- Vehicle registration plate (until 2022): KS

Malá Lodina (Hungarian: Kisladna) is a village and large municipality in Košice-okolie District in the Kosice Region of eastern Slovakia.

== History ==
In historical records, the village was first mentioned in 1386.

== Geography ==
The municipality lies at an altitude of 262 metres (860 ft) and covers an area of 38.34 km^{2} (14.80 sq mi) (2025).

== Population ==
Population statistic (10 years)
Year	1995	2005	2015	2025
Count	194	187	172	219
Difference		−3.60%	−8.02%	+27.32%

Population statistic
Year	2024	2025
Count	222	219
Difference		−1.35%

It has a population of 219 people (31 December 2025).

=== Ethnicity ===
Census 2021 (1+ %)
Ethnicity	Number	Fraction
Slovak	214	93.85%
Not found out	8	3.5%
Hungarian	8	3.5%
Rusyn	5	2.19%
Czech	3	1.31%
Total	228	

In year 2021 was 228 people by ethnicity 214 as Slovak, 8 as Not found out, 8 as Hungarian, 5 as Rusyn, 3 as Czech and 2 as Russian.

Note on population: The difference values of population numbers in the table "Population statistic" and in the sections "Ethnicity" & "Religion" is caused by the use of various statistical methods.

=== Religion ===
Census 2021 (1+ %)
Religion	Number	Fraction
Roman Catholic Church	158	69.3%
None	44	19.3%
Not found out	7	3.07%
Greek Catholic Church	5	2.19%
Evangelical Church	4	1.75%
Ad hoc movements	3	1.32%
Total	228	

In year 2021 was 228 people by religion 158 from Roman Catholic Church, 44 from None, 7 from Not found out, 5 from Greek Catholic Church, 4 from Evangelical Church, 3 from Ad hoc movements, 2 from Eastern Orthodox Church, 2 from Paganism and natural spirituality, 2 from Other and 1 from Buddhism.
