= Vajkovce =

Vajkovce Tarcavajkóc
- Municipality
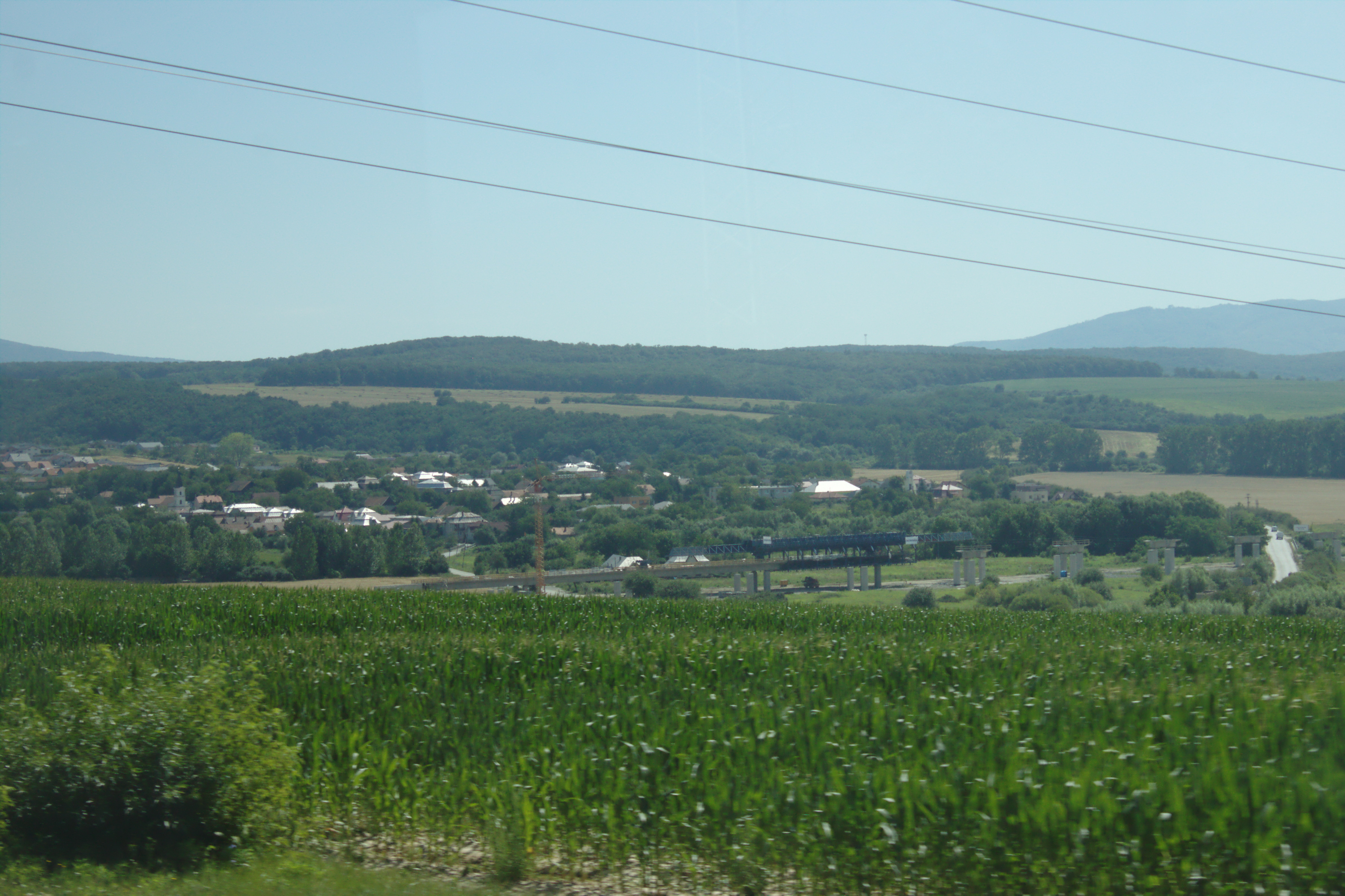

- Flag

- Location of Vajkovce in the Košice Region Location of Vajkovce in Slovakia
- Coordinates: 48.78°N 21.32°E
- Country: Slovakia
- Region: Košice Region
- District: Košice-okolie District
- First mentioned: 1630

Area
  - Total: 3.88 km^{2} (1.50 sq mi)
- Elevation: 209 m (686 ft)

Population (2025)
  - Total: 935
- Time zone: UTC+1 (CET)
  - Summer (DST): UTC+2 (CEST)
- Postal code: 444 3
- Area code: +421 55
- Vehicle registration plate (until 2022): KS
- Website: www.obecvajkovce.sk

Vajkovce (Hungarian: Tarcavajkóc) is a village and municipality in Košice-okolie District in the Kosice Region of eastern Slovakia.

== History ==
In historical records, the village was first mentioned in 1630.

== Geography ==
The municipality lies at an altitude of 209 metres (686 ft) and covers an area of 3.88 km^{2} (1.50 sq mi) (2025).

== Population ==
Population statistic (10 years)
Year	1995	2005	2015	2025
Count	486	519	789	935
Difference		+6.79%	+52.02%	+18.50%

Population statistic
Year	2024	2025
Count	933	935
Difference		+0.21%

It has a population of 935 people (31 December 2025).

=== Ethnicity ===
Census 2021 (1+ %)
Ethnicity	Number	Fraction
Slovak	840	89.26%
Not found out	75	7.97%
Czech	16	1.7%
Romani	14	1.48%
Other	14	1.48%
Hungarian	13	1.38%
Rusyn	12	1.27%
Total	941	

In year 2021 was 941 people by ethnicity 840 as Slovak, 75 as Not found out, 16 as Czech, 14 as Romani, 14 as Other, 13 as Hungarian, 12 as Rusyn, 1 as Russian, 1 as German and 1 as Bulgarian.

Note on population: The difference values of population numbers in the table "Population statistic" and in the sections "Ethnicity" & "Religion" is caused by the use of various statistical methods.

=== Religion ===
Census 2021 (1+ %)
Religion	Number	Fraction
Roman Catholic Church	330	35.07%
None	214	22.74%
Calvinist Church	158	16.79%
Not found out	71	7.55%
Greek Catholic Church	69	7.33%
Evangelical Church	61	6.48%
Eastern Orthodox Church	10	1.06%
Total	941	

In year 2021 was 941 people by religion 330 from Roman Catholic Church, 214 from None, 158 from Calvinist Church, 71 from Not found out, 69 from Greek Catholic Church, 61 from Evangelical Church, 10 from Eastern Orthodox Church, 5 from Christian Congregations in Slovakia, 5 from Baptists Church, 5 from Apostolic Church, 4 from Islam, 3 from Ad hoc movements, 2 from Other, 1 from Jewish community, 1 from Paganism and natural spirituality, 1 from Jehovah's Witnesses and 1 from Buddhism.
