= Vyšná Myšľa =

Municipality of Slovakia

Vyšná Myšľa Felsőmislye
- Municipality
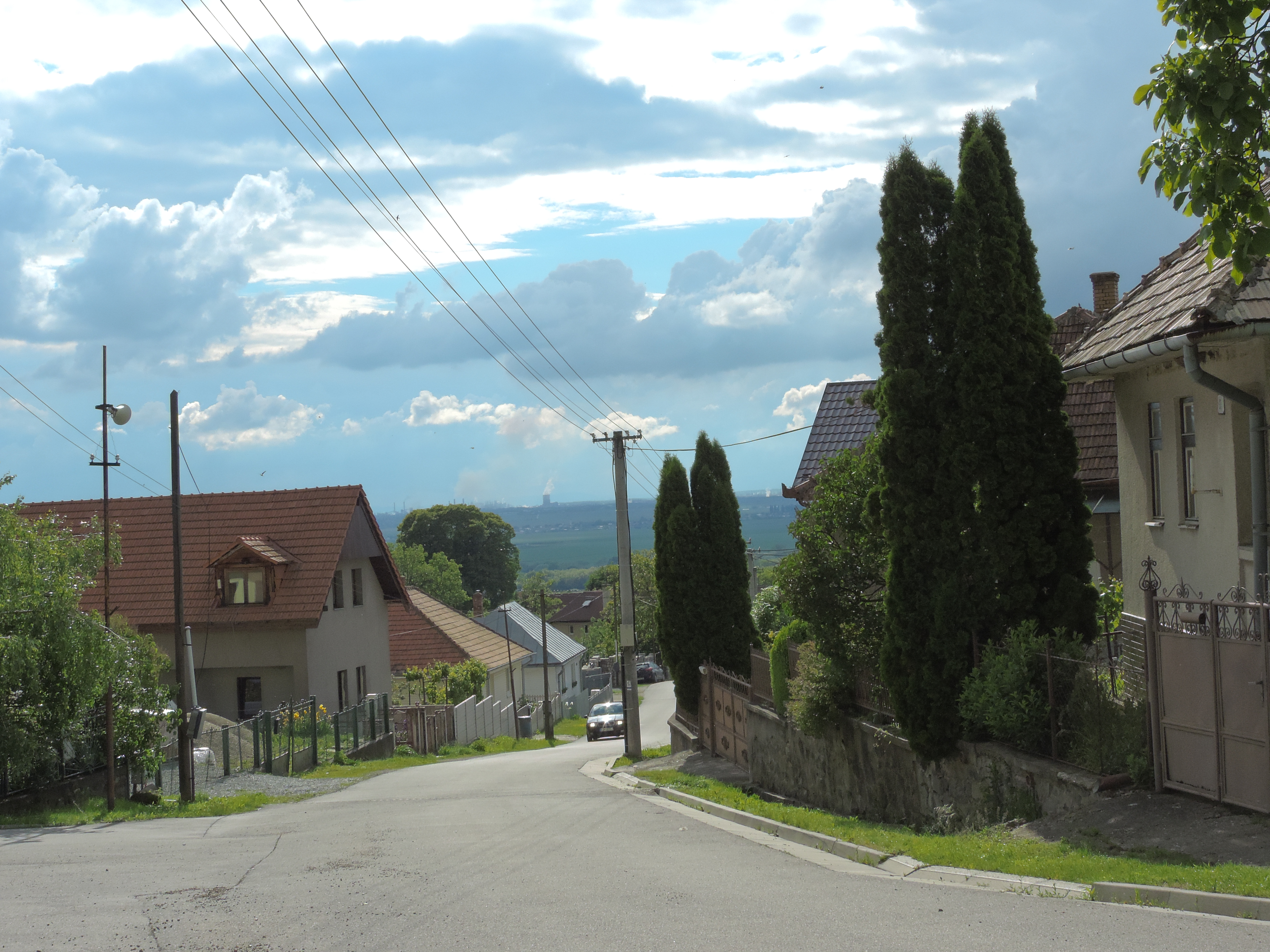

- Flag

- Location of Vyšná Myšľa in the Košice Region Location of Vyšná Myšľa in Slovakia
- Coordinates: 48.63°N 21.38°E
- Country: Slovakia
- Region: Košice Region
- District: Košice-okolie District
- First mentioned: 1270

Area
  - Total: 8.86 km^{2} (3.42 sq mi)
- Elevation: 233 m (764 ft)

Population (2025)
  - Total: 990
- Time zone: UTC+1 (CET)
  - Summer (DST): UTC+2 (CEST)
- Postal code: 441 5
- Area code: +421 55
- Vehicle registration plate (until 2022): KS
- Website: www.vysnamysla.sk

Vyšná Myšľa (Hungarian: Felsőmislye) is a village and municipality in Košice-okolie District in the Kosice Region of eastern Slovakia.

== History ==
In historical records the village was first mentioned in 1270.

== Geography ==
The municipality lies at an altitude of 233 metres (764 ft) and covers an area of 8.86 km^{2} (3.42 sq mi) (2025).

== Transport ==
The village has a railway station. It is 17 km to Košice.

== Population ==
Population statistic (10 years)
Year	1995	2005	2015	2025
Count	829	894	969	990
Difference		+7.84%	+8.38%	+2.16%

Population statistic
Year	2024	2025
Count	999	990
Difference		−0.90%

It has a population of 990 people (31 December 2025).

=== Ethnicity ===
Census 2021 (1+ %)
Ethnicity	Number	Fraction
Slovak	906	94.67%
Romani	25	2.61%
Not found out	18	1.88%
Total	957	

In year 2021 was 957 people by ethnicity 906 as Slovak, 25 as Romani, 18 as Not found out, 5 as Hungarian, 4 as Czech, 3 as Russian, 2 as Other, 1 as Serbian, 1 as Rusyn, 1 as German and 1 as Croatian.

Note on population: The difference values of population numbers in the table "Population statistic" and in the sections "Ethnicity" & "Religion" is caused by the use of various statistical methods.

=== Religion ===
Census 2021 (1+ %)
Religion	Number	Fraction
Roman Catholic Church	774	80.88%
None	108	11.29%
Not found out	20	2.09%
Greek Catholic Church	20	2.09%
Evangelical Church	10	1.04%
Total	957	

In year 2021 was 957 people by religion 774 from Roman Catholic Church, 108 from None, 20 from Not found out, 20 from Greek Catholic Church, 10 from Evangelical Church, 9 from Calvinist Church, 4 from Jehovah's Witnesses, 3 from Baptists Church, 2 from Old Catholic Church, 2 from Other, 1 from Eastern Orthodox Church, 1 from Other and not ascertained christian church, 1 from Islam, 1 from Buddhism and 1 from Ad hoc movements.
