= Bočiar =

Village and municipality in Slovakia

Bočiar Bocsárd
- Municipality
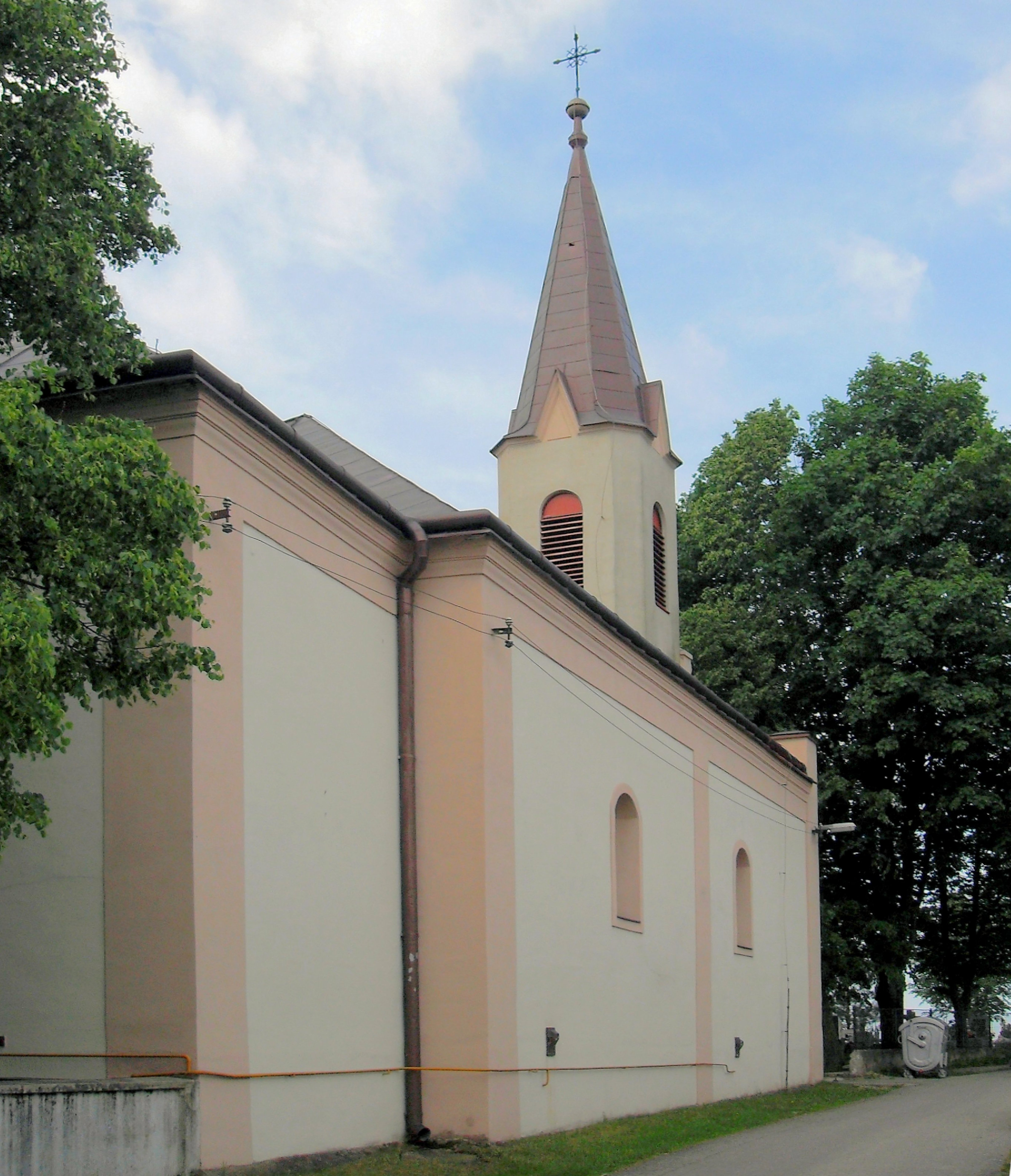

- Flag

- Location of Bočiar in the Košice Region Location of Bočiar in Slovakia
- Coordinates: 48.58°N 21.25°E
- Country: Slovakia
- Region: Košice Region
- District: Košice-okolie District
- First mentioned: 1249

Area
  - Total: 0.47 km^{2} (0.18 sq mi)
- Elevation: 205 m (673 ft)

Population (2025)
  - Total: 246
- Time zone: UTC+1 (CET)
  - Summer (DST): UTC+2 (CEST)
- Postal code: 445 6
- Area code: +421 55
- Vehicle registration plate (until 2022): KS
- Website: www.bociar.sk

Bočiar (Hungarian: Bocsárd) is a village and municipality in Košice-okolie District in the Košice Region of eastern Slovakia.

== History ==
In historical records the village was first mentioned in 1249.

== Geography ==
The municipality lies at an altitude of 205 metres (673 ft) and covers an area of 0.47 km^{2} (0.18 sq mi) (2025).

== Population ==
Population statistic (10 years)
Year	1995	2005	2015	2025
Count	221	233	252	246
Difference		+5.42%	+8.15%	−2.38%

Population statistic
Year	2024	2025
Count	242	246
Difference		+1.65%

It has a population of 246 people (31 December 2025).

=== Ethnicity ===
Census 2021 (1+ %)
Ethnicity	Number	Fraction
Slovak	238	95.58%
Not found out	12	4.81%
Romani	9	3.61%
Total	249	

In year 2021 was 249 people by ethnicity 238 as Slovak, 12 as Not found out and 9 as Romani.

Note on population: The difference values of population numbers in the table "Population statistic" and in the sections "Ethnicity" & "Religion" is caused by the use of various statistical methods.

=== Religion ===
Census 2021 (1+ %)
Religion	Number	Fraction
Roman Catholic Church	196	78.71%
None	24	9.64%
Not found out	11	4.42%
Greek Catholic Church	10	4.02%
Calvinist Church	5	2.01%
Total	249	

In year 2021 was 249 people by religion 196 from Roman Catholic Church, 24 from None, 11 from Not found out, 10 from Greek Catholic Church, 5 from Calvinist Church, 2 from Eastern Orthodox Church and 1 from Other.

== Genealogical resources ==
The records for genealogical research are available at the state archive "Statny Archiv in Kosice, Slovakia"

- Roman Catholic church records (births/marriages/deaths): 1714-1952 (parish B)
- Greek Catholic church records (births/marriages/deaths): 1791-1896 (parish B)
- Lutheran church records (births/marriages/deaths): 1714-1952 (parish B)

== See also ==
- List of municipalities and towns in Slovakia
