= Vtáčkovce =

Vtáčkovce Patacskő
- Municipality
- Flag

- Location of Vtáčkovce in the Košice Region Location of Vtáčkovce in Slovakia
- Coordinates: 48.85°N 21.38°E
- Country: Slovakia
- Region: Košice Region
- District: Košice-okolie District
- First mentioned: 1427

Area
  - Total: 3.72 km^{2} (1.44 sq mi)
- Elevation: 395 m (1,296 ft)

Population (2025)
  - Total: 1,320
- Time zone: UTC+1 (CET)
  - Summer (DST): UTC+2 (CEST)
- Postal code: 444 7
- Area code: +421 55
- Vehicle registration plate (until 2022): KS
- Website: www.vtackovce.sk

Vtackovce (Slovak pronunciation: [ˈftaːtʂkɔwtse]; Hungarian: Patacskő) is a village and municipality in Košice-okolie District in the Kosice Region of eastern Slovakia.

== History ==
In historical records the village was first mentioned in 1427.

== Geography ==
The municipality lies at an altitude of 395 metres (1,296 ft) and covers an area of 3.72 km^{2} (1.44 sq mi) (2025).

== Population ==
Population statistic (10 years)
| Year | 1995 | 2005 | 2015 | 2025 |
|---|---|---|---|---|
| Count | 589 | 852 | 1058 | 1320 |
| Difference | | +44.65% | +24.17% | +24.76% |

Population statistic
| Year | 2024 | 2025 |
|---|---|---|
| Count | 1305 | 1320 |
| Difference | | +1.14% |

It has a population of 1320 people (31 December 2025).

=== Ethnicity ===
Census 2021 (1+ %)
| Ethnicity | Number | Fraction |
|---|---|---|
| Slovak | 872 | 70.15% |
| Romani | 760 | 61.14% |
| Not found out | 102 | 8.2% |
| Total | 1243 | |

In year 2021 was 1243 people by ethnicity 872 as Slovak, 760 as Romani, 102 as Not found out, 3 as Hungarian, 2 as Czech, 2 as Rusyn and 1 as English.

Note on population: The difference values of population numbers in the table "Population statistic" and in the sections "Ethnicity" & "Religion" is caused by the use of various statistical methods.

=== Religion ===
Census 2021 (1+ %)
| Religion | Number | Fraction |
|---|---|---|
| Roman Catholic Church | 773 | 62.19% |
| Apostolic Church | 176 | 14.16% |
| None | 74 | 5.95% |
| Evangelical Church | 70 | 5.63% |
| Not found out | 62 | 4.99% |
| Greek Catholic Church | 59 | 4.75% |
| Christian Congregations in Slovakia | 14 | 1.13% |
| Total | 1243 | |

In year 2021 was 1243 people by religion 773 from Roman Catholic Church, 176 from Apostolic Church, 74 from None, 70 from Evangelical Church, 62 from Not found out, 59 from Greek Catholic Church, 14 from Christian Congregations in Slovakia, 11 from Calvinist Church, 3 from United Methodist Church and 1 from New Apostolic Church.

The vast majority of the local population consists of the local Roma community. In 2019, they constituted an estimated 93% of the local population.
