= Nižný Lánec =

Nižný Lánec Alsólánc
- Municipality
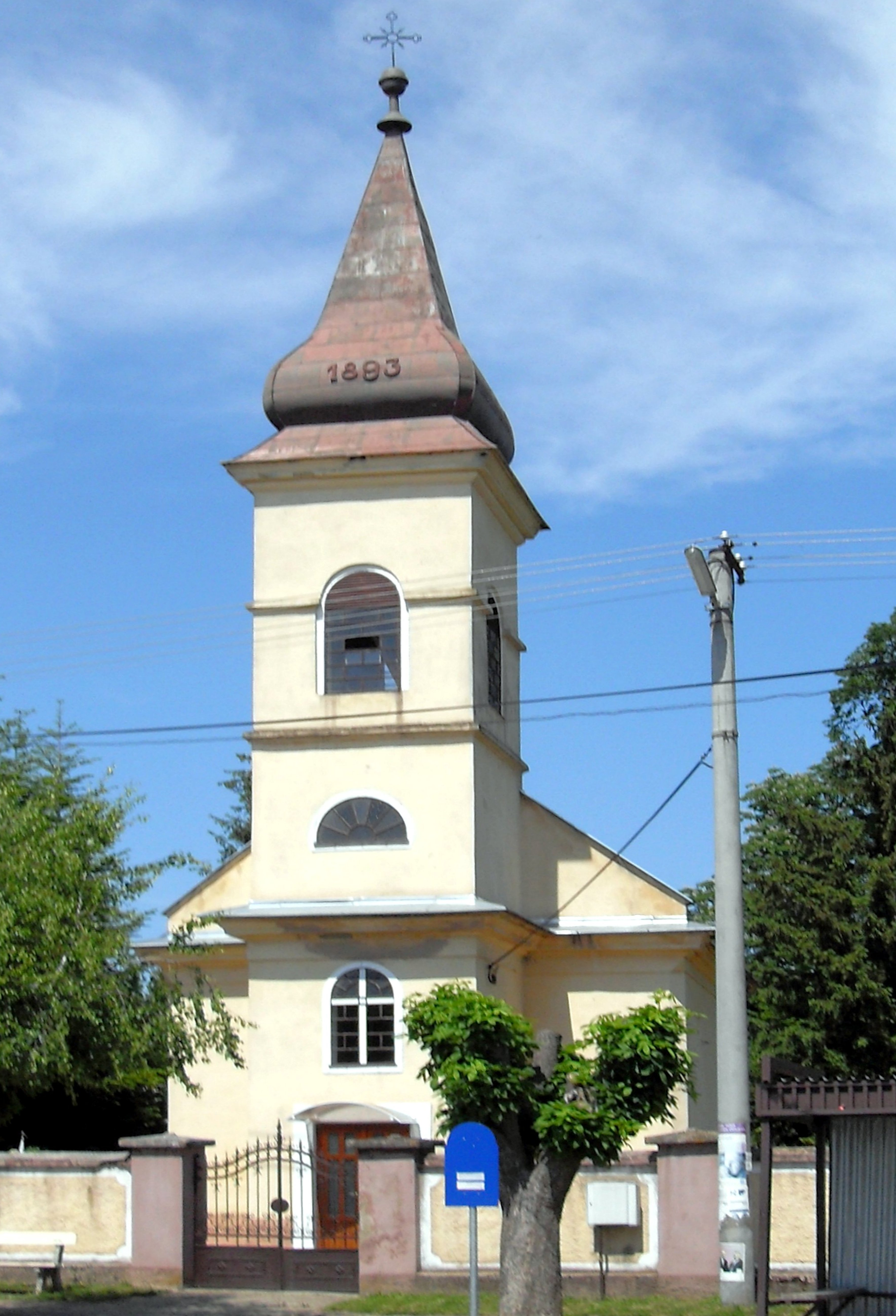

- Flag

- Location of Nižný Lánec in the Košice Region Location of Nižný Lánec in Slovakia
- Coordinates: 48.55°N 21.12°E
- Country: Slovakia
- Region: Košice Region
- District: Košice-okolie District
- First mentioned: 1268

Area
  - Total: 4.10 km^{2} (1.58 sq mi)
- Elevation: 197 m (646 ft)

Population (2025)
  - Total: 475
- Time zone: UTC+1 (CET)
  - Summer (DST): UTC+2 (CEST)
- Postal code: 447 3
- Area code: +421 55
- Vehicle registration plate (until 2022): KS
- Website: www.niznylanec.sk

Nižný Lánec (Hungarian: Alsólánc) is a village and municipality in Košice-okolie District in the Kosice Region of eastern Slovakia.

== History ==
In historical records, the village was first mentioned in 1268.

== Geography ==
The municipality lies at an altitude of 197 metres (646 ft) and covers an area of 4.10 km^{2} (1.58 sq mi) (2025).

== Population ==
Population statistic (10 years)
Year	1995	2005	2015	2025
Count	388	420	443	475
Difference		+8.24%	+5.47%	+7.22%

Population statistic
Year	2024	2025
Count	471	475
Difference		+0.84%

It has a population of 475 people (31 December 2025).

=== Ethnicity ===
Census 2021 (1+ %)
Ethnicity	Number	Fraction
Hungarian	321	71.81%
Romani	134	29.97%
Slovak	121	27.06%
Not found out	26	5.81%
Total	447	

In year 2021 was 447 people by ethnicity 321 as Hungarian, 134 as Romani, 121 as Slovak, 26 as Not found out and 1 as English.

Note on population: The difference values of population numbers in the table "Population statistic" and in the sections "Ethnicity" & "Religion" is caused by the use of various statistical methods.

=== Religion ===
Census 2021 (1+ %)
Religion	Number	Fraction
Roman Catholic Church	259	57.94%
Calvinist Church	142	31.77%
Not found out	24	5.37%
None	14	3.13%
Greek Catholic Church	6	1.34%
Total	447	

In year 2021 was 447 people by religion 259 from Roman Catholic Church, 142 from Calvinist Church, 24 from Not found out, 14 from None, 6 from Greek Catholic Church and 2 from Evangelical Church.
