= Chrastné =

Village and municipality in Slovakia

Chrastné Abaújharaszti
- Municipality
- Flag

- Location of Chrastné in the Košice Region Location of Chrastné in Slovakia
- Coordinates: 48.80°N 21.35°E
- Country: Slovakia
- Region: Košice Region
- District: Košice-okolie District
- First mentioned: 1427

Area
  - Total: 4.73 km^{2} (1.83 sq mi)
- Elevation: 247 m (810 ft)

Population (2025)
  - Total: 759
- Time zone: UTC+1 (CET)
  - Summer (DST): UTC+2 (CEST)
- Postal code: 444 4
- Area code: +421 55
- Vehicle registration plate (until 2022): KS
- Website: www.chrastne.sk

Chrastné (Hungarian: Abaújharaszti) is a village and municipality in Košice-okolie District in the Kosice Region of eastern Slovakia.

== History ==
Historically, the village was first mentioned in 1357.

== Geography ==
The municipality lies at an altitude of 247 metres (810 ft) and covers an area of 4.73 km^{2} (1.83 sq mi) (2025).

== Population ==
Population statistic (10 years)
| Year | 1995 | 2005 | 2015 | 2025 |
|---|---|---|---|---|
| Count | 323 | 378 | 509 | 759 |
| Difference | | +17.02% | +34.65% | +49.11% |

Population statistic
| Year | 2024 | 2025 |
|---|---|---|
| Count | 726 | 759 |
| Difference | | +4.54% |

It has a population of 759 people (31 December 2025).

=== Ethnicity ===
Census 2021 (1+ %)
| Ethnicity | Number | Fraction |
|---|---|---|
| Slovak | 578 | 91.45% |
| Romani | 32 | 5.06% |
| Not found out | 22 | 3.48% |
| Total | 632 | |

In year 2021 was 632 people by ethnicity 578 as Slovak, 32 as Romani, 22 as Not found out, 6 as Rusyn, 6 as Hungarian, 3 as Ukrainian and 2 as Czech.

Note on population: The difference values of population numbers in the table "Population statistic" and in the sections "Ethnicity" & "Religion" is caused by the use of various statistical methods.

=== Religion ===
Census 2021 (1+ %)
| Religion | Number | Fraction |
|---|---|---|
| Roman Catholic Church | 287 | 45.41% |
| None | 113 | 17.88% |
| Greek Catholic Church | 87 | 13.77% |
| Evangelical Church | 80 | 12.66% |
| Calvinist Church | 22 | 3.48% |
| Not found out | 19 | 3.01% |
| Total | 632 | |

In year 2021 was 632 people by religion 287 from Roman Catholic Church, 113 from None, 87 from Greek Catholic Church, 80 from Evangelical Church, 22 from Calvinist Church, 19 from Not found out, 6 from Eastern Orthodox Church, 6 from Jehovah's Witnesses, 4 from Other, 2 from Other and not ascertained christian church, 2 from Church of the Brethren, 2 from Ad hoc movements, 1 from United Methodist Church and 1 from Buddhism.

== Genealogical resources ==
The records for genealogical research are available at the state archive "Statny Archiv in Kosice, Slovakia"

- Roman Catholic church records (births/marriages/deaths): 1749-1896 (parish B)
- Greek Catholic church records (births/marriages/deaths): 1819-1898 (parish B)
- Reformated church records (births/marriages/deaths): 1753-1896 (parish B)

== See also ==
- List of municipalities and towns in Slovakia
