= Vyšný Klátov =

Vyšný Klátov Felsőtőkés
- Municipality
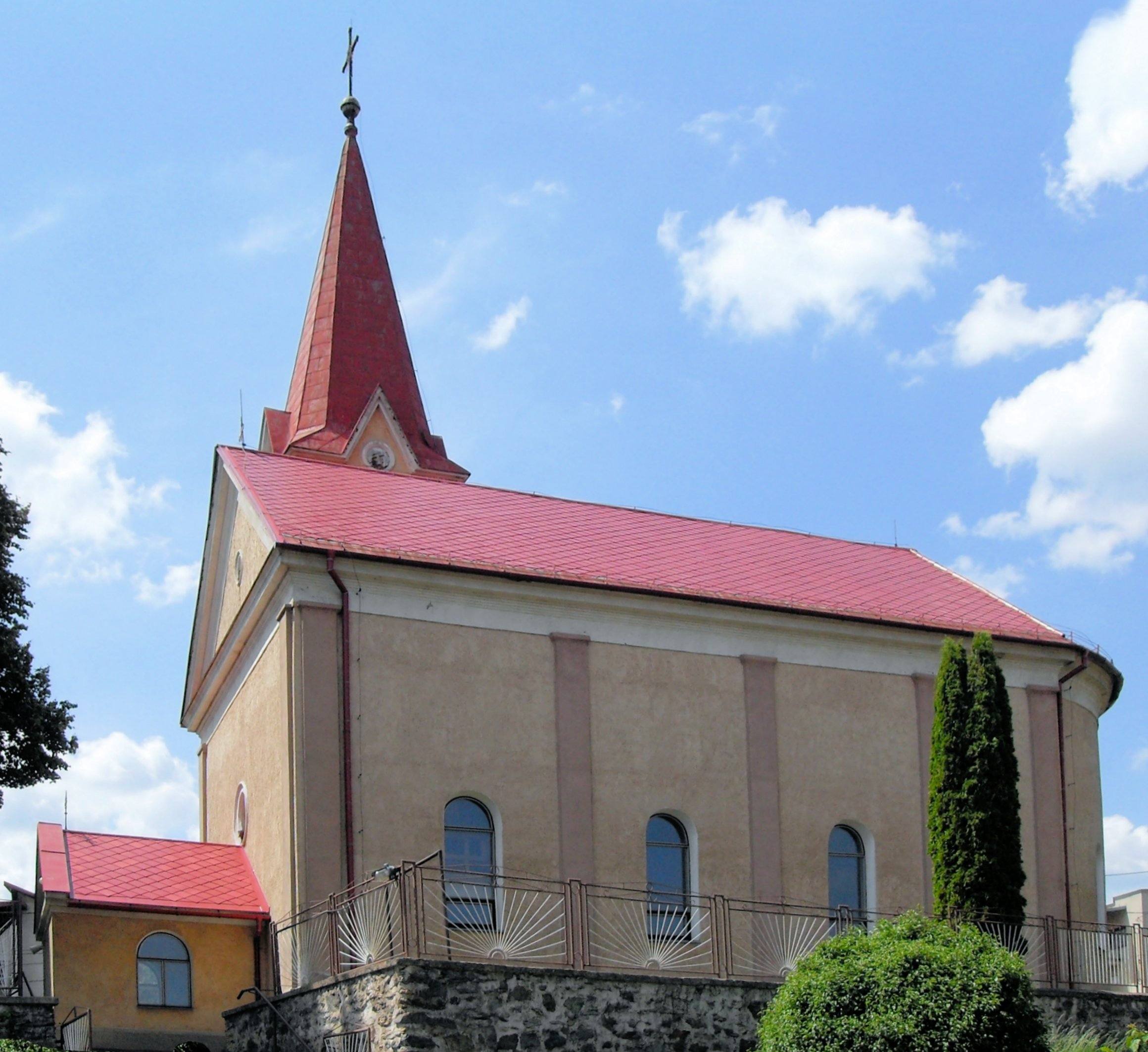

- Flag

- Location of Vyšný Klátov in the Košice Region Location of Vyšný Klátov in Slovakia
- Coordinates: 48.75°N 21.13°E
- Country: Slovakia
- Region: Košice Region
- District: Košice-okolie District
- First mentioned: 1332

Area
  - Total: 17.83 km^{2} (6.88 sq mi)
- Elevation: 486 m (1,594 ft)

Population (2025)
  - Total: 496
- Time zone: UTC+1 (CET)
  - Summer (DST): UTC+2 (CEST)
- Postal code: 441 2
- Area code: +421 55
- Vehicle registration plate (until 2022): KS
- Website: www.vysnyklatov.sk

Vyšný Klátov (German: Beckseifen, Beckenseifen; Hungarian: Felsőtőkés) (1332/5 Superior Turastukes, 1397 Fel Teukes, 1400 Superior Bokkenzeifin, 1580 Ober-Beckseyffen) is a village and municipality in Košice-okolie District in the Košice Region of eastern Slovakia.

== Geography ==
The municipality lies at an altitude of 486 metres (1,594 ft) and covers an area of 17.83 km^{2} (6.88 sq mi) (2025).

== History ==
In historical records the village was first mentioned in 1317 as a German medieval settlement. It belonged to Košice town. On February 28, 2010 a meteorite impact was recorded in the Eastern Slovakia, the first fragments were found on March 20, 2010 near the village.

== Population ==
Population statistic (10 years)
Year	1995	2005	2015	2025
Count	376	413	450	496
Difference		+9.84%	+8.95%	+10.22%

Population statistic
Year	2024	2025
Count	487	496
Difference		+1.84%

It has a population of 496 people (31 December 2025).

=== Ethnicity ===
Census 2021 (1+ %)
Ethnicity	Number	Fraction
Slovak	458	97.44%
Not found out	9	1.91%
Hungarian	7	1.48%
Rusyn	5	1.06%
Total	470	

In year 2021 was 470 people by ethnicity 458 as Slovak, 9 as Not found out, 7 as Hungarian, 5 as Rusyn, 2 as German, 1 as Romanian and 1 as Polish.

Note on population: The difference values of population numbers in the table "Population statistic" and in the sections "Ethnicity" & "Religion" is caused by the use of various statistical methods.

=== Religion ===
Census 2021 (1+ %)
Religion	Number	Fraction
Roman Catholic Church	377	80.21%
None	58	12.34%
Not found out	7	1.49%
Greek Catholic Church	7	1.49%
Jehovah's Witnesses	6	1.28%
Evangelical Church	5	1.06%
Total	470	

In year 2021 was 470 people by religion 377 from Roman Catholic Church, 58 from None, 7 from Not found out, 7 from Greek Catholic Church, 6 from Jehovah's Witnesses, 5 from Evangelical Church, 4 from Paganism and natural spirituality, 3 from Other, 2 from Calvinist Church and 1 from Eastern Orthodox Church.
