= Opiná =

Opiná Sárosófalu
- Municipality
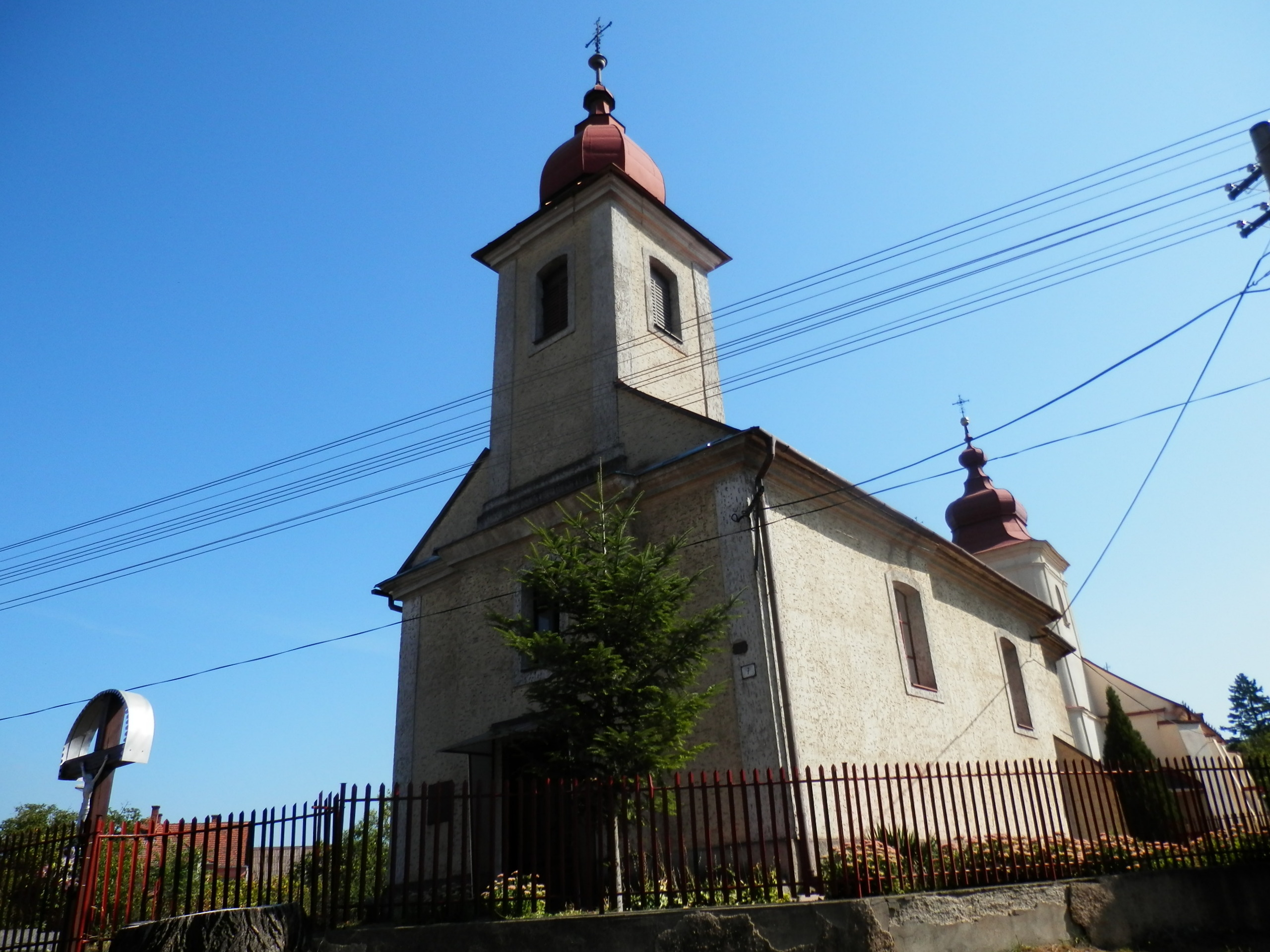

- Flag

- Location of Opiná in the Košice Region Location of Opiná in Slovakia
- Coordinates: 48.85°N 21.43°E
- Country: Slovakia
- Region: Košice Region
- District: Košice-okolie District
- First mentioned: 1418

Area
  - Total: 11.95 km^{2} (4.61 sq mi)
- Elevation: 367 m (1,204 ft)

Population (2025)
  - Total: 195
- Time zone: UTC+1 (CET)
  - Summer (DST): UTC+2 (CEST)
- Postal code: 444 7
- Area code: +421 55
- Vehicle registration plate (until 2022): KS
- Website: opina.sk

Opiná (Hungarian: Sárosófalu) is a village and municipality in Košice-okolie District in the Kosice Region of eastern Slovakia.

== History ==
In historical records the village was first mentioned in 1418.

== Geography ==
The municipality lies at an altitude of 367 metres (1,204 ft) and covers an area of 11.95 km^{2} (4.61 sq mi) (2025).

== Population ==
Population statistic (10 years)
Year	1995	2005	2015	2025
Count	154	172	188	195
Difference		+11.68%	+9.30%	+3.72%

Population statistic
Year	2024	2025
Count	195	195
Difference		+0%

It has a population of 195 people (31 December 2025).

=== Ethnicity ===
Census 2021 (1+ %)
Ethnicity	Number	Fraction
Slovak	193	98.46%
Not found out	4	2.04%
Romani	3	1.53%
Total	196	

In year 2021 was 196 people by ethnicity 193 as Slovak, 4 as Not found out, 3 as Romani and 1 as Ukrainian.

Note on population: The difference values of population numbers in the table "Population statistic" and in the sections "Ethnicity" & "Religion" is caused by the use of various statistical methods.

=== Religion ===
Census 2021 (1+ %)
Religion	Number	Fraction
Roman Catholic Church	83	42.35%
Evangelical Church	76	38.78%
None	16	8.16%
Greek Catholic Church	9	4.59%
Jehovah's Witnesses	4	2.04%
Calvinist Church	3	1.53%
Christian Congregations in Slovakia	3	1.53%
Not found out	2	1.02%
Total	196	

In year 2021 was 196 people by religion 83 from Roman Catholic Church, 76 from Evangelical Church, 16 from None, 9 from Greek Catholic Church, 4 from Jehovah's Witnesses, 3 from Calvinist Church, 3 from Christian Congregations in Slovakia and 2 from Not found out.

== Culture ==
The village has a small public library and a general store.
