= Košice-okolie District =

Coordinates: 48°43′N 21°15′E

Košice–okolie District
- District
- Country: Slovakia
- Region (kraj): Košice Region
- Seat: Košice

Area
  - Total: 1,534.58 km^{2} (592.50 sq mi)

Population (2025)
  - Total: 134,540
- Time zone: UTC+1 (CET)
  - Summer (DST): UTC+2 (CEST)
- Telephone prefix: 055
- Vehicle registration plate (until 2022): KS
- Municipalities: 114

Košice–okolie District (Slovak: okres Košice–okolie; Hungarian: Kassa-vidéki járás, lit. 'Košice-Surroundings') is a district in the Košice Region of eastern Slovakia. It surrounds the city of Košice, which serves as the district seat although it does not belong to the district.

== History ==
The Košice–okolie district was a part of Kingdom of Hungary until the 1920. After the district fell apart, the area was incorporated into Abaúj and Torna, which were counties of the Kingdom of Hungary.

The region was a part of Abaúj-Torna County from 1882 until the end of World War I. It then became part of the newly formed Czechoslovakia.

Excluding a small section in the north, the district formed a part of Abovsko-turnianská župa of the county of Šariš from 1918 to 1923. From 1923 to 1928, the Košice–okolie district was considered to be a part of Košická župa. From 1923 to 1938, the district was considered to be Slovak land. After the First Vienna Award in 1938, the district was divided between the Kingdom of Hungary and the Slovak Republic, a client state of Nazi Germany. After World War II, the region became known as the district of Košice-vidiek, which is part of Košický kraj. The district of Košice-okolie was established in 1997.

== Population ==
Historical population
Year	Pop.	±%
1970	95,890	—
1980	99,227	+3.5%
1991	99,271	+0.0%
2001	106,999	+7.8%
2011	119,227	+11.4%
2021	128,346	+7.6%
Source: Censuses

Population statistic (10 years)
Year	1995	2005	2015	2025
Count	101,630	110,997	124,578	134,540
Difference		+9.21%	+12.23%	+7.99%

Population statistic
Year	2024	2025
Count	133,321	134,540
Difference		+0.91%

It has a population of 134,540 people (31 December 2025).

=== Ethnicity ===
Census 2021 (1+ %)
Ethnicity	Number	Fraction
Slovak	105,563	74.95%
Hungarian	12,550	8.91%
Romani	12,378	8.78%
Not found out	7522	5.34%
Total	140,827	

In year 2021 was 140,827 people by ethnicity 105,563 as Slovak, 12,550 as Hungarian, 12,378 as Romani, 7522 as Not found out, 700 as Rusyn, 663 as German, 571 as Czech, 288 as Other, 152 as Ukrainian, 121 as Russian, 92 as Polish, 34 as English, 23 as Jewish, 21 as Moravian, 18 as Italian, 17 as French, 15 as Serbian, 13 as Irish, 11 as Vietnamese, 10 as Austrian, 10 as Greek, 10 as Bulgarian, 10 as Albanian, 9 as Croatian, 8 as Canadian, 7 as Romanian, 4 as Chinese, 3 as Silesian, 2 as Iranian, 1 as Turkish and 1 as Korean.

Note on population: The difference values of population numbers in the table "Population statistic" and in the sections "Ethnicity" & "Religion" is caused by the use of various statistical methods.

=== Religion ===
Census 2021 (1+ %)
Religion	Number	Fraction
Roman Catholic Church	82,011	63.9%
None	18,664	14.54%
Not found out	7421	5.78%
Calvinist Church	6705	5.22%
Greek Catholic Church	5696	4.44%
Evangelical Church	4628	3.61%
Total	128,346	

In year 2021 was 128,346 people by religion 82,011 from Roman Catholic Church, 18,664 from None, 7421 from Not found out, 6705 from Calvinist Church, 5696 from Greek Catholic Church, 4628 from Evangelical Church, 583 from Jehovah's Witnesses, 515 from Apostolic Church, 489 from Eastern Orthodox Church, 415 from Christian Congregations in Slovakia, 241 from Other, 230 from Ad hoc movements, 190 from Seventh-day Adventist Church, 161 from Other and not ascertained christian church, 64 from Buddhism, 63 from Baptists Church, 60 from Paganism and natural spirituality, 55 from United Methodist Church, 50 from Islam, 36 from Old Catholic Church, 19 from Jewish community, 17 from Hinduism, 14 from Church of the Brethren, 8 from Church of Jesus Christ of Latter-day Saints, 5 from New Apostolic Church, 4 from Czechoslovak Hussite Church and 2 from Bahá'i Community.

== Municipalities ==
Municipality	Area [km^{2}]	Population
Bačkovík	4.17	661
Baška	4.49	807
Belža	5.48	452
Beniakovce	3.78	901
Bidovce	9.81	1,716
Blažice	3.40	655
Bočiar	0.47	246
Bohdanovce	5.93	1,182
Boliarov	9.40	1,112
Budimír	6.92	1,419
Bukovec	10.82	900
Bunetice	8.35	95
Buzica	19.86	1,154
Cestice	13.02	878
Čakanovce	9.61	768
Čaňa	11.55	6,151
Čečejovce	24.52	2,129
Čižatice	7.67	410
Debraď	23.79	400
Drienovec	28.07	2,532
Družstevná pri Hornáde	16.40	2,902
Ďurďošík	4.58	867
Ďurkov	9.92	2,090
Dvorníky-Včeláre	13.63	550
Geča	5.48	1,897
Gyňov	5.37	675
Hačava	36.91	180
Háj	21.35	240
Haniska	17.28	1,579
Herľany	9.90	287
Hodkovce	7.58	416
Hosťovce	4.82	220
Hrašovík	2.04	436
Hýľov	23.88	556
Chorváty	3.30	95
Chrastné	4.73	759
Janík	19.86	594
Jasov	35.41	3,803
Kalša	4.62	761
Kecerovce	13.80	4,171
Kecerovský Lipovec	15.56	96
Kechnec	10.21	1,141
Kokšov-Bakša	3.56	1,360
Komárovce	8.49	414
Kostoľany nad Hornádom	0.00	1,183
Košická Belá	39.57	1,005
Košická Polianka	8.21	1,062
Košické Oľšany	8.66	1,415
Košický Klečenov	13.40	312
Kráľovce	6.53	1,167
Kysak	10.89	1,409
Malá Ida	10.19	2,053
Malá Lodina	38.34	219
Medzev	64.29	4,181
Milhosť	7.78	405
Mokrance	23.41	1,586
Moldava nad Bodvou	19.76	10,284
Mudrovce	5.88	61
Nižná Hutka	4.34	623
Nižná Kamenica	13.32	733
Nižná Myšľa	12.61	1,615
Nižný Čaj	2.94	288
Nižný Klátov	5.96	966
Nižný Lánec	4.10	475
Nováčany	17.34	765
Nová Polhora	2.07	559
Nový Salaš	11.02	254
Obišovce	9.81	491
Olšovany	9.97	686
Opátka	13.90	108
Opiná	11.95	195
Paňovce	20.67	623
Peder	11.27	380
Perín-Chym	41.51	1,600
Ploské	10.00	1,048
Poproč	26.40	2,644
Rákoš	10.56	384
Rankovce	14.84	1,084
Rešica	12.49	367
Rozhanovce	22.20	2,671
Rudník	23.00	622
Ruskov	20.20	1,807
Sady nad Torysou	8.44	1,924
Seňa	22.48	2,239
Skároš	36.87	1,171
Slančík	3.30	218
Slanec	20.45	1,502
Slanská Huta	14.16	265
Slanské Nové Mesto	30.11	484
Sokoľ	15.66	1,350
Sokoľany	3.85	1,359
Svinica	27.12	1,004
Šemša	17.18	1,033
Štós	31.35	728
Trebejov	7.67	212
Trsťany	6.59	371
Trstené pri Hornáde	12.90	1,512
Turňa nad Bodvou	23.21	3,707
Turnianska Nová Ves	6.42	287
Vajkovce	3.88	935
Valaliky	8.63	4,556
Veľká Ida	31.00	4,317
Veľká Lodina	19.69	326
Vtáčkovce	3.72	1,320
Vyšná Hutka	3.62	570
Vyšná Kamenica	11.33	408
Vyšná Myšľa	8.86	990
Vyšný Čaj	4.82	304
Vyšný Klátov	17.83	496
Vyšný Medzev	0.00	576
Zádiel	3.51	154
Zlatá Idka	16.21	439
Žarnov	7.19	462
Ždaňa	5.56	1,334

Population and area values are current for year 2025.
