= Nováčany =

Municipality of Slovakia

Nováčany Jászóújfalu
- Municipality
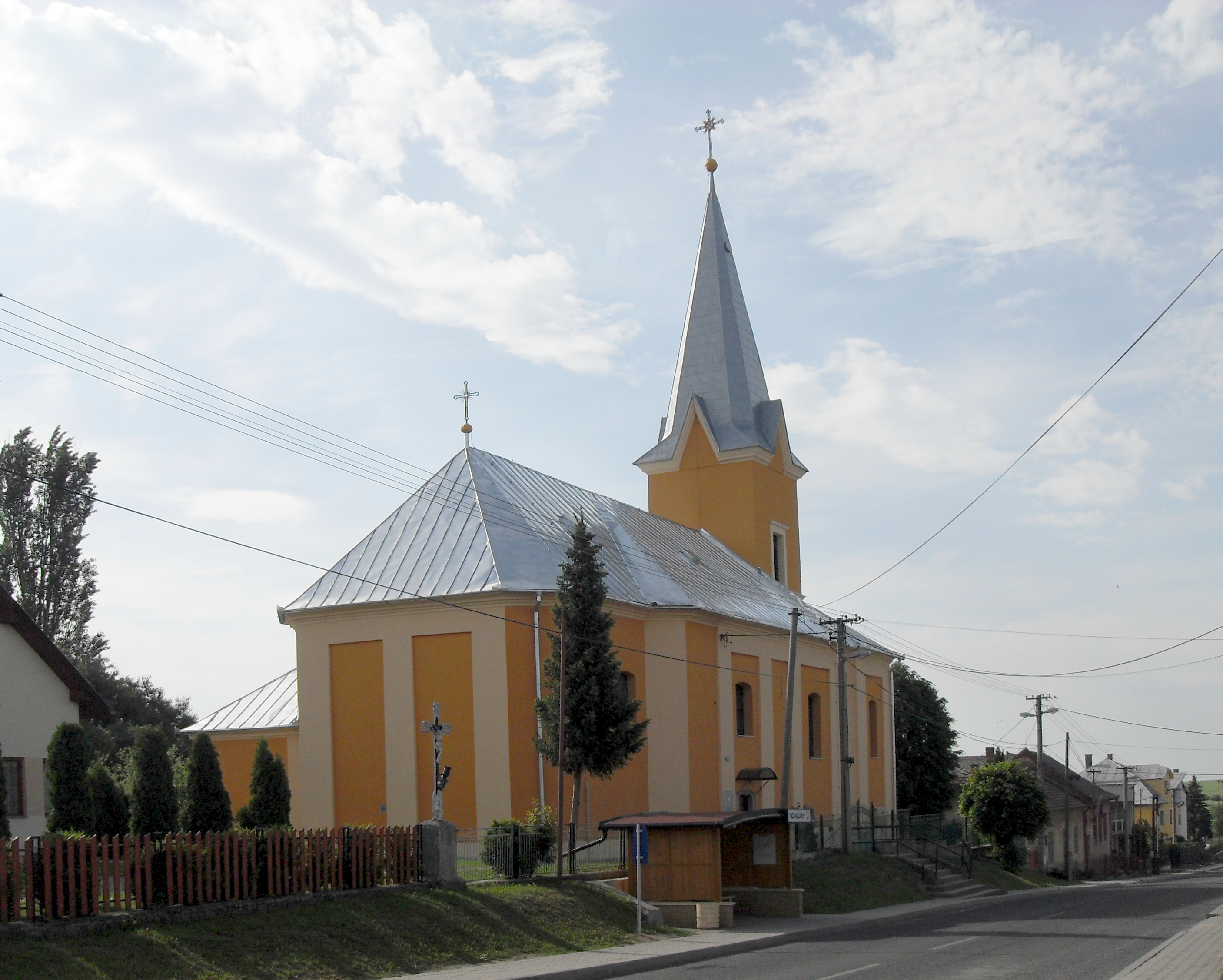

- Flag

- Location of Nováčany in the Košice Region Location of Nováčany in Slovakia
- Coordinates: 48.69°N 21.07°E
- Country: Slovakia
- Region: Košice Region
- District: Košice-okolie District
- First mentioned: 1322

Area
  - Total: 17.34 km^{2} (6.70 sq mi)
- Elevation: 334 m (1,096 ft)

Population (2025)
  - Total: 765
- Time zone: UTC+1 (CET)
  - Summer (DST): UTC+2 (CEST)
- Postal code: 442 2
- Area code: +421 55
- Vehicle registration plate (until 2022): KS
- Website: www.obecnovacany.sk

Nováčany (Hungarian: Jászóújfalu, alternatively Nasztraj) is a village and municipality in Košice-okolie District in the Kosice Region of eastern Slovakia.

== History ==
In historical records the village was first mentioned in 1322.

== Geography ==
The municipality lies at an altitude of 334 metres (1,096 ft) and covers an area of 17.34 km^{2} (6.70 sq mi) (2025).

== Population ==
Population statistic (10 years)
Year	1995	2005	2015	2025
Count	632	685	755	765
Difference		+8.38%	+10.21%	+1.32%

Population statistic
Year	2024	2025
Count	758	765
Difference		+0.92%

It has a population of 765 people (31 December 2025).

=== Ethnicity ===
Census 2021 (1+ %)
Ethnicity	Number	Fraction
Slovak	673	89.85%
Romani	65	8.67%
Not found out	53	7.07%
Hungarian	11	1.46%
Total	749	

In year 2021 was 749 people by ethnicity 673 as Slovak, 65 as Romani, 53 as Not found out, 11 as Hungarian, 6 as Czech, 5 as Other, 2 as Ukrainian, 2 as Rusyn, 2 as Russian and 1 as Moravian.

Note on population: The difference values of population numbers in the table "Population statistic" and in the sections "Ethnicity" & "Religion" is caused by the use of various statistical methods.

=== Religion ===
Census 2021 (1+ %)
Religion	Number	Fraction
Roman Catholic Church	507	67.69%
None	147	19.63%
Not found out	49	6.54%
Greek Catholic Church	17	2.27%
Total	749	

In year 2021 was 749 people by religion 507 from Roman Catholic Church, 147 from None, 49 from Not found out, 17 from Greek Catholic Church, 6 from Evangelical Church, 5 from Christian Congregations in Slovakia, 4 from Calvinist Church, 4 from Other, 2 from Eastern Orthodox Church, 2 from Other and not ascertained christian church, 2 from Islam, 2 from Ad hoc movements, 1 from Jehovah's Witnesses and 1 from Buddhism.

== Culture ==
The village has a public library and a football playground and food facilities.
