= Blažice =

Municipality of Slovakia

Blažice Balogd
- Municipality
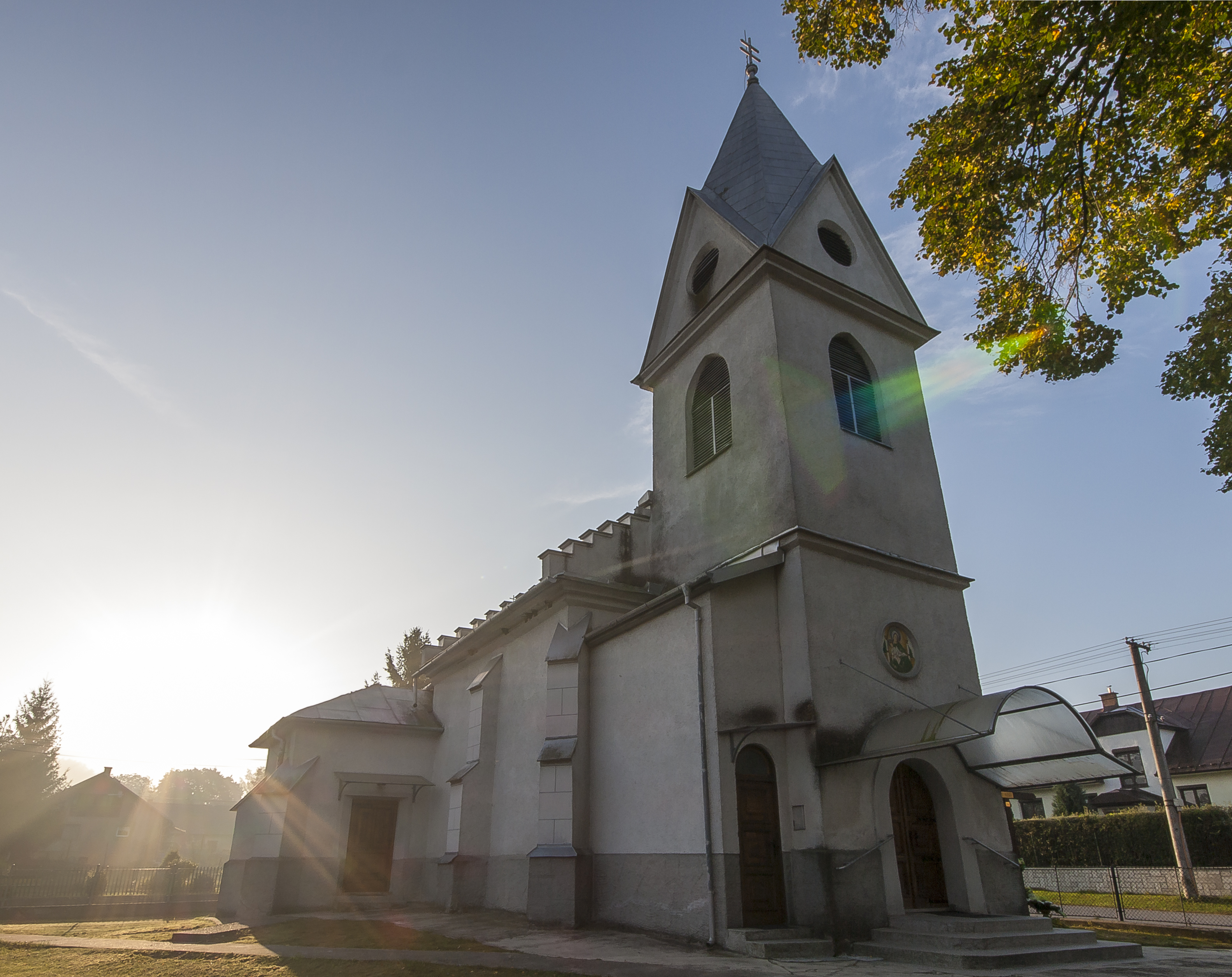

- Flag

- Location of Blažice in the Košice Region Location of Blažice in Slovakia
- Coordinates: 48.67°N 21.42°E
- Country: Slovakia
- Region: Košice Region
- District: Košice-okolie District
- First mentioned: 1245

Area
  - Total: 3.40 km^{2} (1.31 sq mi)
- Elevation: 208 m (682 ft)

Population (2025)
  - Total: 655
- Time zone: UTC+1 (CET)
  - Summer (DST): UTC+2 (CEST)
- Postal code: 441 6
- Area code: +421 55
- Vehicle registration plate (until 2022): KS
- Website: www.blazice.sk

Blažice (Hungarian: Balogd) is a village and municipality in Košice-okolie District in the Kosice Region of eastern Slovakia.

== History ==
Historically, the village was first mentioned in 1245.

== Geography ==
The municipality lies at an altitude of 208 metres (682 ft) and covers an area of 3.40 km^{2} (1.31 sq mi) (2025).

== Population ==
Population statistic (10 years)
Year	1995	2005	2015	2025
Count	403	514	608	655
Difference		+27.54%	+18.28%	+7.73%

Population statistic
Year	2024	2025
Count	655	655
Difference		+0%

It has a population of 655 people (31 December 2025).

=== Ethnicity ===
Census 2021 (1+ %)
Ethnicity	Number	Fraction
Slovak	628	96.46%
Romani	38	5.83%
Not found out	16	2.45%
Czech	7	1.07%
Total	651	

In year 2021 was 651 people by ethnicity 628 as Slovak, 38 as Romani, 16 as Not found out, 7 as Czech, 3 as Rusyn, 2 as Russian, 2 as Hungarian, 1 as Other and 1 as Greek.

Note on population: The difference values of population numbers in the table "Population statistic" and in the sections "Ethnicity" & "Religion" is caused by the use of various statistical methods.

=== Religion ===
Census 2021 (1+ %)
Religion	Number	Fraction
Roman Catholic Church	505	77.57%
None	63	9.68%
Greek Catholic Church	26	3.99%
Not found out	17	2.61%
Evangelical Church	15	2.3%
Calvinist Church	10	1.54%
Total	651	

In year 2021 was 651 people by religion 505 from Roman Catholic Church, 63 from None, 26 from Greek Catholic Church, 17 from Not found out, 15 from Evangelical Church, 10 from Calvinist Church, 5 from Apostolic Church, 4 from Eastern Orthodox Church, 2 from Other and not ascertained christian church, 2 from Christian Congregations in Slovakia, 1 from Other and 1 from Buddhism.

== Genealogical resources ==
The records for genealogical research are available at the state archive "Statny Archiv in Kosice, Slovakia"

- Roman Catholic church records (births/marriages/deaths): 1766-1918 (parish B)
- Reformated church records (births/marriages/deaths): 1728-1899 (parish B)

== See also ==
- List of municipalities and towns in Slovakia
