= Nový Salaš =

Municipality of Slovakia

Nový Salaš Újszállás
- Municipality
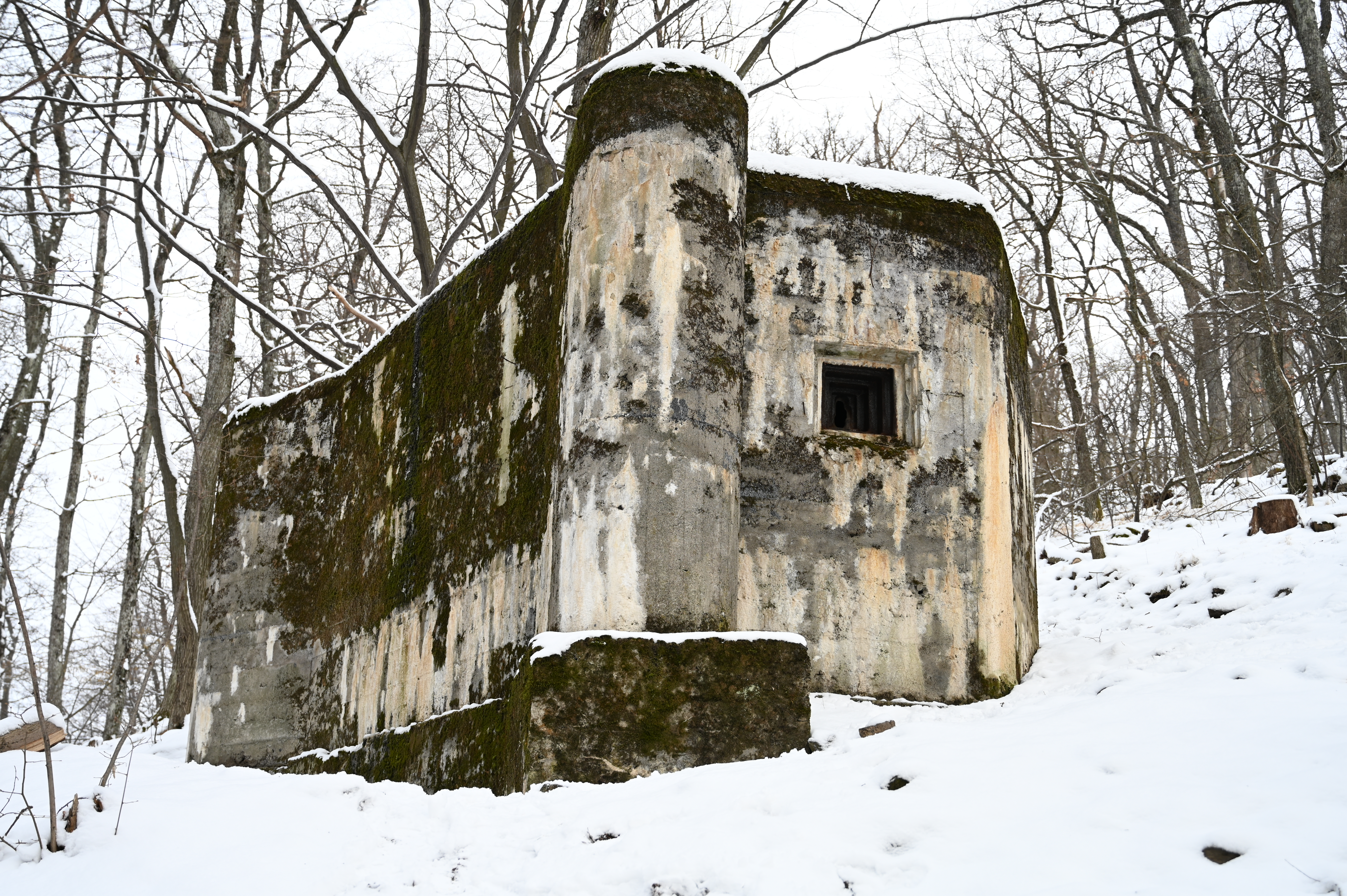

- Flag

- Location of Nový Salaš in the Košice Region Location of Nový Salaš in Slovakia
- Coordinates: 48.62°N 21.48°E
- Country: Slovakia
- Region: Košice Region
- District: Košice-okolie District
- First mentioned: 1553

Area
  - Total: 11.02 km^{2} (4.25 sq mi)
- Elevation: 360 m (1,180 ft)

Population (2025)
  - Total: 254
- Time zone: UTC+1 (CET)
  - Summer (DST): UTC+2 (CEST)
- Postal code: 441 7
- Area code: +421 55
- Vehicle registration plate (until 2022): KS
- Website: www.novysalas.sk

Nový Salaš (Hungarian: Újszállás) is a village and municipality in Košice-okolie District in the Kosice Region of eastern Slovakia.

== History ==
In historical records the village was first mentioned in 1533.

== Geography ==
The municipality lies at an altitude of 360 metres (1,180 ft) and covers an area of 11.02 km^{2} (4.25 sq mi) (2025).

== Population ==
Population statistic (10 years)
Year	1995	2005	2015	2025
Count	218	202	220	254
Difference		−7.33%	+8.91%	+15.45%

Population statistic
Year	2024	2025
Count	256	254
Difference		−0.78%

It has a population of 254 people (31 December 2025).

=== Ethnicity ===
Census 2021 (1+ %)
Ethnicity	Number	Fraction
Slovak	214	96.83%
Romani	6	2.71%
Not found out	4	1.8%
Rusyn	3	1.35%
Total	221	

In year 2021 was 221 people by ethnicity 214 as Slovak, 6 as Romani, 4 as Not found out, 3 as Rusyn, 1 as Italian and 1 as Other.

Note on population: The difference values of population numbers in the table "Population statistic" and in the sections "Ethnicity" & "Religion" is caused by the use of various statistical methods.

=== Religion ===
Census 2021 (1+ %)
Religion	Number	Fraction
Roman Catholic Church	183	82.81%
None	25	11.31%
Greek Catholic Church	7	3.17%
Not found out	4	1.81%
Total	221	

In year 2021 was 221 people by religion 183 from Roman Catholic Church, 25 from None, 7 from Greek Catholic Church, 4 from Not found out, 1 from Calvinist Church and 1 from Eastern Orthodox Church.
