= Bačkovík =

Village and municipality in Slovakia

Bačkovík Bátyok
- Municipality
- Flag

- Location of Bačkovík in the Košice Region Location of Bačkovík in Slovakia
- Coordinates: 48.78°N 21.43°E
- Country: Slovakia
- Region: Košice Region
- District: Košice-okolie District
- First mentioned: 1329

Area
  - Total: 4.17 km^{2} (1.61 sq mi)
- Elevation: 269 m (883 ft)

Population (2025)
  - Total: 661
- Time zone: UTC+1 (CET)
  - Summer (DST): UTC+2 (CEST)
- Postal code: 444 5
- Area code: +421 55
- Vehicle registration plate (until 2022): KS
- Website: backovik.sk

Bačkovík (1323 Bagak, 1427 Nagybagyok, Nagybadoch, 1430 Nogh Bagh, Kysbagh) (German: Batschkowig; Hungarian: Bátyok) is a village and municipality in Košice-okolie District in the Košice Region of Slovakia.

== History ==
Historically, the village was first mentioned in 1329as Sztancsóy (Stančov) feudatories’ property. After, in the order, it belonged to Perényi (1427), Zombory (18th century), Desseffwy and Bocskay noble families.

== Geography ==
The municipality lies at an altitude of 269 metres (883 ft) and covers an area of 4.17 km^{2} (1.61 sq mi) (2025).

== Population ==
Population statistic (10 years)
Year	1995	2005	2015	2025
Count	362	423	538	661
Difference		+16.85%	+27.18%	+22.86%

Population statistic
Year	2024	2025
Count	645	661
Difference		+2.48%

It has a population of 661 people (31 December 2025).

=== Ethnicity ===
Census 2021 (1+ %)
Ethnicity	Number	Fraction
Slovak	546	94.3%
Romani	87	15.02%
Not found out	12	2.07%
Total	579	

In year 2021 was 579 people by ethnicity 546 as Slovak, 87 as Romani, 12 as Not found out, 2 as Czech, 2 as Greek, 1 as Ukrainian, 1 as Serbian and 1 as Rusyn.

Note on population: The difference values of population numbers in the table "Population statistic" and in the sections "Ethnicity" & "Religion" is caused by the use of various statistical methods.

=== Religion ===
Census 2021 (1+ %)
Religion	Number	Fraction
Roman Catholic Church	314	54.23%
Evangelical Church	121	20.9%
None	79	13.64%
Greek Catholic Church	25	4.32%
Apostolic Church	22	3.8%
Not found out	10	1.73%
Total	579	

In year 2021 was 579 people by religion 314 from Roman Catholic Church, 121 from Evangelical Church, 79 from None, 25 from Greek Catholic Church, 22 from Apostolic Church, 10 from Not found out, 2 from Calvinist Church, 2 from Islam, 2 from United Methodist Church, 1 from Other and 1 from Hinduism.

== Genealogical resources ==
The records for genealogical research are available at the state archive in Košice (Slovak: Štátny archív v Košiciach).

- Roman Catholic church records (births/marriages/deaths): 1755-1895
- Greek Catholic church records (births/marriages/deaths): 1788-1906
- Lutheran church records (births/marriages/deaths): 1775-1895
- Census records 1869 of Backovik are available at the state archive.

== See also ==
- List of municipalities and towns in Slovakia
