= Boliarov =

Village and municipality in Slovakia

Boliarov Bolyár
- Municipality
- Flag

- Location of Boliarov in the Košice Region Location of Boliarov in Slovakia
- Coordinates: 48.80°N 21.43°E
- Country: Slovakia
- Region: Košice Region
- District: Košice-okolie District
- First mentioned: 1289

Area
  - Total: 9.40 km^{2} (3.63 sq mi)
- Elevation: 308 m (1,010 ft)

Population (2025)
  - Total: 1,112
- Time zone: UTC+1 (CET)
  - Summer (DST): UTC+2 (CEST)
- Postal code: 444 7
- Area code: +421 55
- Vehicle registration plate (until 2022): KS
- Website: boliarov.sk

Boliarov (Hungarian: Bolyár) is a village and municipality in Košice-okolie District in the Kosice Region of eastern Slovakia.

The majority of the municipality's population consists of the members of the local Roma community. In 2019, they constituted an estimated 70% of the population.

== Geography ==
The municipality lies at an altitude of 308 metres (1,010 ft) and covers an area of 9.40 km^{2} (3.63 sq mi) (2025).

== Population ==
Population statistic (10 years)
Year	1995	2005	2015	2025
Count	494	654	844	1112
Difference		+32.38%	+29.05%	+31.75%

Population statistic
Year	2024	2025
Count	1074	1112
Difference		+3.53%

It has a population of 1112 people (31 December 2025).

=== Ethnicity ===
Census 2021 (1+ %)
Ethnicity	Number	Fraction
Slovak	852	86.93%
Romani	650	66.32%
Not found out	120	12.24%
Total	980	

In year 2021 was 980 people by ethnicity 852 as Slovak, 650 as Romani, 120 as Not found out, 2 as Rusyn, 2 as Hungarian and 2 as French.

Note on population: The difference values of population numbers in the table "Population statistic" and in the sections "Ethnicity" & "Religion" is caused by the use of various statistical methods.

=== Religion ===
Census 2021 (1+ %)
Religion	Number	Fraction
None	305	31.12%
Roman Catholic Church	241	24.59%
Jehovah's Witnesses	174	17.76%
Evangelical Church	128	13.06%
Not found out	104	10.61%
Calvinist Church	18	1.84%
Total	980	

In year 2021 was 980 people by religion 305 from None, 241 from Roman Catholic Church, 174 from Jehovah's Witnesses, 128 from Evangelical Church, 104 from Not found out, 18 from Calvinist Church, 6 from Greek Catholic Church, 2 from Other and not ascertained christian church, 1 from Other and 1 from Apostolic Church.

== Genealogical resources ==
The records for genealogical research are available at the state archive "Statny Archiv in Kosice, Slovakia"

- Roman Catholic church records (births/marriages/deaths): 1755-1895 (parish B)
- Greek Catholic church records (births/marriages/deaths): 1819-1898 (parish B)
- Lutheran church records (births/marriages/deaths): 1775-1895 (parish B)

== See also ==
- List of municipalities and towns in Slovakia
