= Slanské Nové Mesto =

Slanské Nové Mesto Szaláncújváros
- Municipality
- Flag

- Location of Slanské Nové Mesto in the Košice Region Location of Slanské Nové Mesto in Slovakia
- Coordinates: 48.63°N 21.53°E
- Country: Slovakia
- Region: Košice Region
- District: Košice-okolie District
- First mentioned: 1332

Area
  - Total: 30.11 km^{2} (11.63 sq mi)
- Elevation: 221 m (725 ft)

Population (2025)
  - Total: 484
- Time zone: UTC+1 (CET)
  - Summer (DST): UTC+2 (CEST)
- Postal code: 441 8
- Area code: +421 55
- Vehicle registration plate (until 2022): KS
- Website: www.slanskenovemesto.sk

Slanské Nové Mesto (Hungarian: Szaláncújváros) is a village and municipality in Košice-okolie District in the Kosice Region of eastern Slovakia.

== History ==
In historical records the village was first mentioned in 1332 (Vyuarus, Wywaros) as a royal city “ cives et hospites de Nova Civitate regale”. In 1387 it belonged to Slanec. In 1427 it belonged to noble family Lossonczy.

== Transport ==
The village is connected via railway at the nearest station in Kalsa.

== Geography ==
The municipality lies at an altitude of 221 metres (725 ft) and covers an area of 30.11 km^{2} (11.63 sq mi) (2025).

== Population ==
Population statistic (10 years)
Year	1995	2005	2015	2025
Count	514	475	478	484
Difference		−7.58%	+0.63%	+1.25%

Population statistic
Year	2024	2025
Count	462	484
Difference		+4.76%

It has a population of 484 people (31 December 2025).

=== Ethnicity ===
Census 2021 (1+ %)
Ethnicity	Number	Fraction
Slovak	454	97.84%
Not found out	11	2.37%
Total	464	

In year 2021 was 464 people by ethnicity 454 as Slovak, 11 as Not found out, 3 as Rusyn, 1 as Czech, 1 as Ukrainian, 1 as Serbian and 1 as Other.

Note on population: The difference values of population numbers in the table "Population statistic" and in the sections "Ethnicity" & "Religion" is caused by the use of various statistical methods.

=== Religion ===
Census 2021 (1+ %)
Religion	Number	Fraction
Roman Catholic Church	247	53.23%
Greek Catholic Church	146	31.47%
None	40	8.62%
Not found out	14	3.02%
Evangelical Church	7	1.51%
Total	464	

In year 2021 was 464 people by religion 247 from Roman Catholic Church, 146 from Greek Catholic Church, 40 from None, 14 from Not found out, 7 from Evangelical Church, 4 from Calvinist Church, 3 from Eastern Orthodox Church, 1 from Islam, 1 from Czechoslovak Hussite Church and 1 from Ad hoc movements.
