= Cestice =

Village and municipality in Slovakia

Cestice Szeszta
- Municipality
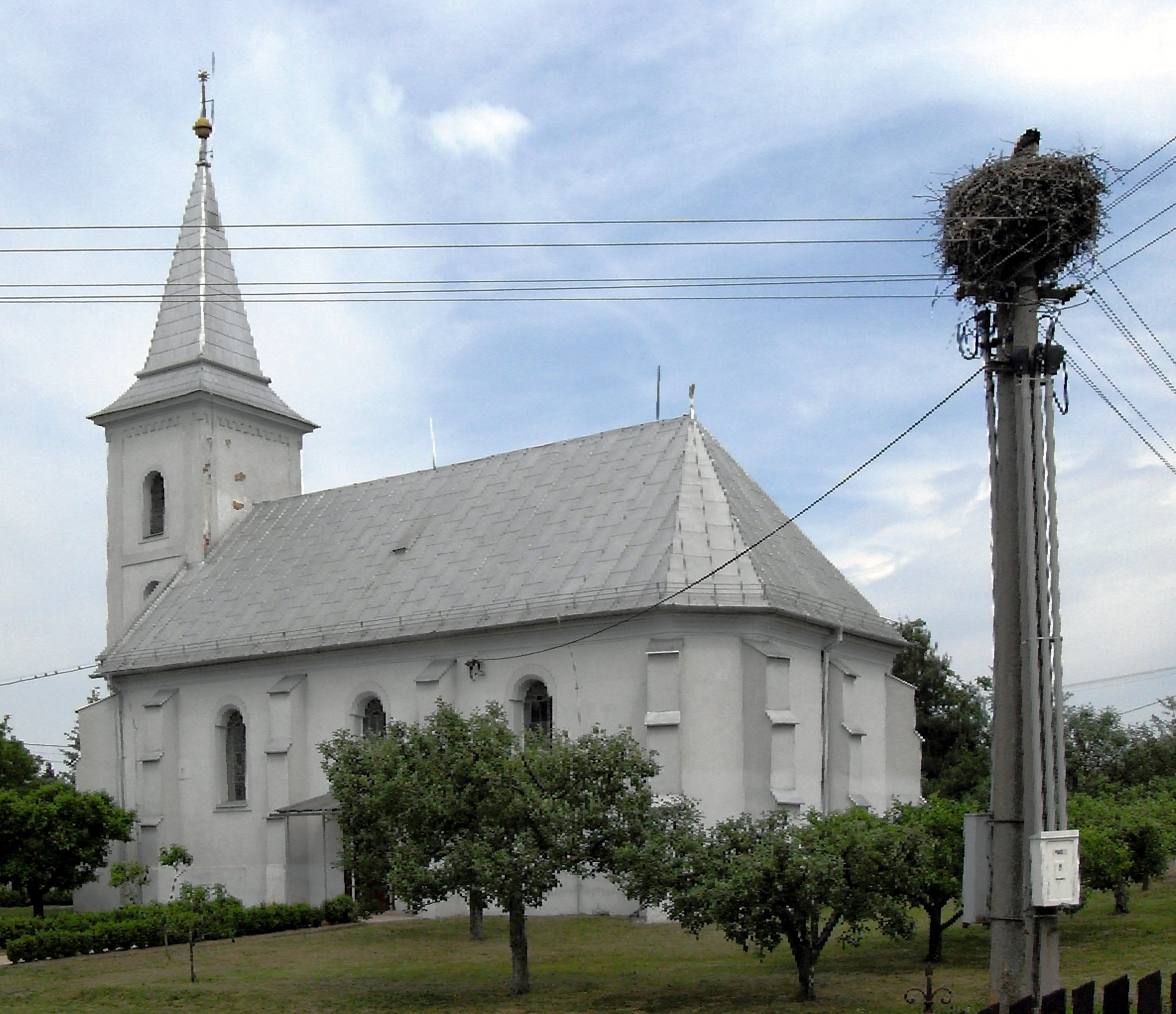

- Flag

- Location of Cestice in the Košice Region Location of Cestice in Slovakia
- Coordinates: 48.60°N 21.12°E
- Country: Slovakia
- Region: Košice Region
- District: Košice-okolie District
- First mentioned: 1317

Area
  - Total: 13.02 km^{2} (5.03 sq mi)
- Elevation: 211 m (692 ft)

Population (2025)
  - Total: 878
- Time zone: UTC+1 (CET)
  - Summer (DST): UTC+2 (CEST)
- Postal code: 447 1
- Area code: +421 55
- Vehicle registration plate (until 2022): KS
- Website: cestice.ezaz.eu

Cestice (Hungarian: Szeszta) is a village and municipality in Košice-okolie District in the Kosice Region of eastern Slovakia.

== Geography ==
The municipality lies at an altitude of 211 metres (692 ft) and covers an area of 13.02 km^{2} (5.03 sq mi) (2025).

== History ==
Historically the village was first mentioned in 1317.

== Genealogical resources ==
The records for genealogical research are available at the state archive "Statny Archiv in Kosice, Slovakia"

- Roman Catholic church records (births/marriages/deaths): 1788-1897 (parish B)
- Greek Catholic church records (births/marriages/deaths): 1870-1902 (parish A)
- Reformated church records (births/marriages/deaths): 1772-1896 (parish A)

== Population ==
Population statistic (10 years)
Year	1995	2005	2015	2025
Count	766	787	851	878
Difference		+2.74%	+8.13%	+3.17%

Population statistic
Year	2024	2025
Count	853	878
Difference		+2.93%

It has a population of 878 people (31 December 2025).

=== Ethnicity ===
Census 2021 (1+ %)
Ethnicity	Number	Fraction
Slovak	515	61.97%
Hungarian	312	37.54%
Not found out	47	5.65%
Total	831	

In year 2021 was 831 people by ethnicity 515 as Slovak, 312 as Hungarian, 47 as Not found out, 5 as Czech, 4 as Rusyn, 4 as Polish, 2 as Irish, 2 as Ukrainian, 1 as Italian, 1 as Romanian and 1 as German.

Note on population: The difference values of population numbers in the table "Population statistic" and in the sections "Ethnicity" & "Religion" is caused by the use of various statistical methods.

=== Religion ===
Census 2021 (1+ %)
Religion	Number	Fraction
Roman Catholic Church	366	44.04%
Calvinist Church	229	27.56%
Greek Catholic Church	96	11.55%
None	66	7.94%
Not found out	41	4.93%
Evangelical Church	23	2.77%
Total	831	

In year 2021 was 831 people by religion 366 from Roman Catholic Church, 229 from Calvinist Church, 96 from Greek Catholic Church, 66 from None, 41 from Not found out, 23 from Evangelical Church, 4 from Eastern Orthodox Church, 3 from Ad hoc movements, 1 from Christian Congregations in Slovakia, 1 from Other and 1 from Buddhism.

== See also ==
- List of municipalities and towns in Slovakia
