= Komárovce =

Village and municipality in Slovakia

Komárovce Komaróc
- Municipality
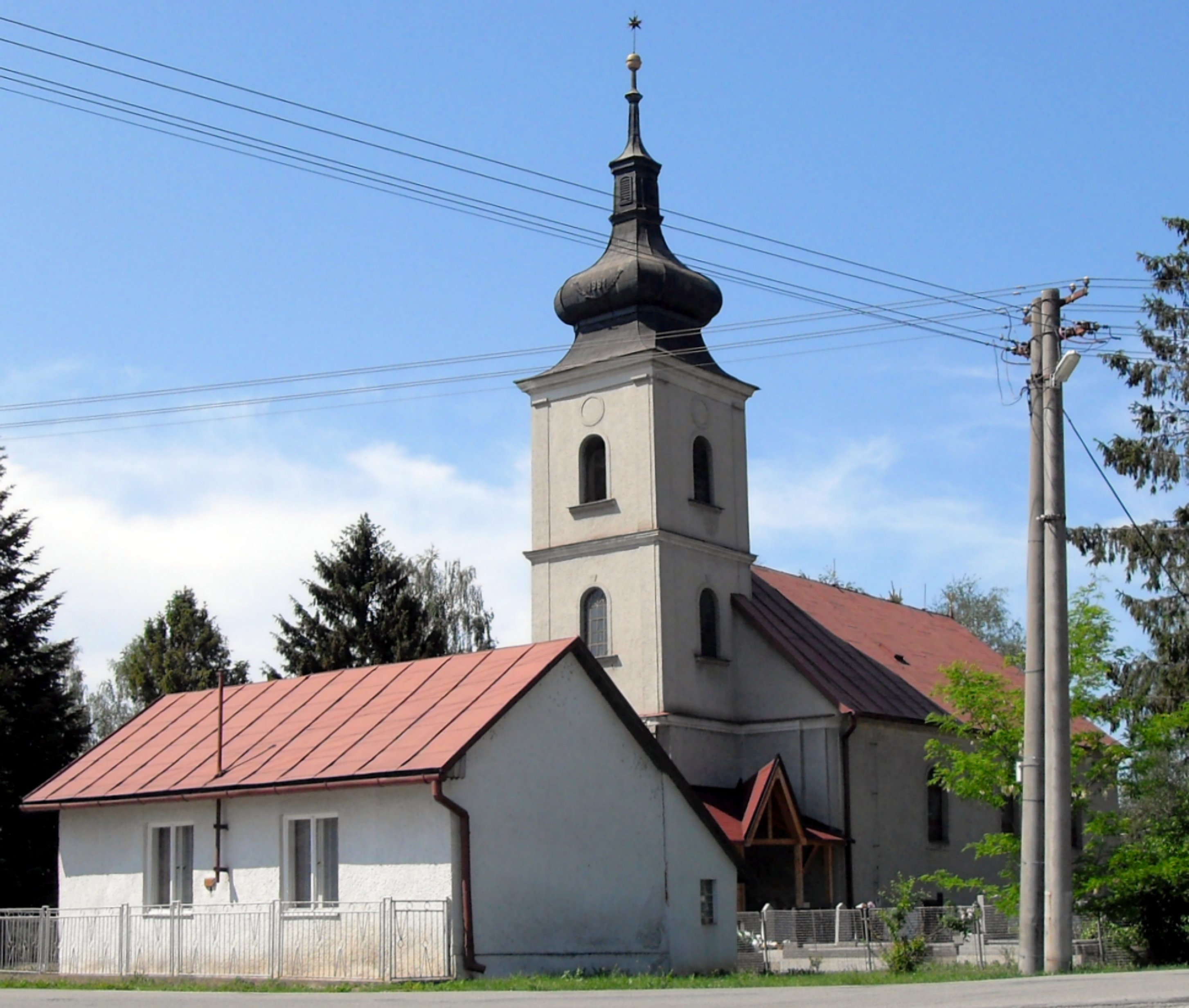

- Flag

- Location of Komárovce in the Košice Region Location of Komárovce in Slovakia
- Coordinates: 48.57°N 21.12°E
- Country: Slovakia
- Region: Košice Region
- District: Košice-okolie District
- First mentioned: 1402

Area
  - Total: 8.49 km^{2} (3.28 sq mi)
- Elevation: 198 m (650 ft)

Population (2025)
  - Total: 414
- Time zone: UTC+1 (CET)
  - Summer (DST): UTC+2 (CEST)
- Postal code: 445 5
- Area code: +421 55
- Vehicle registration plate (until 2022): KS
- Website: www.komarovce.sk

Komárovce (Slovak pronunciation: [ˈkɔmaːrɔwtse]) (Hungarian: Komaróc) is a village and municipality in Košice-okolie District in the Kosice Region of eastern Slovakia.

== History ==
Historically, the village was first mentioned in 1402.

== Geography ==
The municipality lies at an altitude of 198 metres (650 ft) and covers an area of 8.49 km^{2} (3.28 sq mi) (2025).

== Population ==
Population statistic (10 years)
Year	1995	2005	2015	2025
Count	437	395	374	414
Difference		−9.61%	−5.31%	+10.69%

Population statistic
Year	2024	2025
Count	422	414
Difference		−1.89%

It has a population of 414 people (31 December 2025).

=== Ethnicity ===
Census 2021 (1+ %)
Ethnicity	Number	Fraction
Hungarian	265	65.43%
Slovak	170	41.97%
Not found out	10	2.46%
Total	405	

In year 2021 was 405 people by ethnicity 265 as Hungarian, 170 as Slovak, 10 as Not found out, 3 as Czech and 1 as Other.

Note on population: The difference values of population numbers in the table "Population statistic" and in the sections "Ethnicity" & "Religion" is caused by the use of various statistical methods.

=== Religion ===
Census 2021 (1+ %)
Religion	Number	Fraction
Roman Catholic Church	187	46.17%
Calvinist Church	144	35.56%
Greek Catholic Church	40	9.88%
None	25	6.17%
Not found out	5	1.23%
Total	405	

In year 2021 was 405 people by religion 187 from Roman Catholic Church, 144 from Calvinist Church, 40 from Greek Catholic Church, 25 from None, 5 from Not found out, 2 from Evangelical Church, 1 from Eastern Orthodox Church and 1 from Other.

== Genealogical resources ==
The records for genealogical research are available at the state archive "Statny Archiv in Kosice, Slovakia"

- Roman Catholic church records (births/marriages/deaths): 1744-1896 (parish B)
- Greek Catholic church records (births/marriages/deaths): 1870-1902 (parish B)

== See also ==
- List of municipalities and towns in Slovakia
