= Vyšná Hutka =

Village and municipality in Slovakia

Vyšná Hutka Felsőhutka
- Municipality
- Flag

- Location of Vyšná Hutka in the Košice Region Location of Vyšná Hutka in Slovakia
- Coordinates: 48.68°N 21.35°E
- Country: Slovakia
- Region: Košice Region
- District: Košice-okolie District
- First mentioned: 1293

Area
  - Total: 3.62 km^{2} (1.40 sq mi)
- Elevation: 197 m (646 ft)

Population (2025)
  - Total: 570
- Time zone: UTC+1 (CET)
  - Summer (DST): UTC+2 (CEST)
- Postal code: 401 8
- Area code: +421 55
- Vehicle registration plate (until 2022): KS
- Website: www.vysnahutka.sk

Vyšná Hutka (Hungarian: Felsőhutka) is a village and municipality in Košice-okolie District in the Kosice Region of eastern Slovakia.

== History ==
In historical records the village was first mentioned in 1293.

== Geography ==
The municipality lies at an altitude of 197 metres (646 ft) and covers an area of 3.62 km^{2} (1.40 sq mi) (2025).

== Population ==
Population statistic (10 years)
Year	1995	2005	2015	2025
Count	367	366	453	570
Difference		−0.27%	+23.77%	+25.82%

Population statistic
Year	2024	2025
Count	549	570
Difference		+3.82%

It has a population of 570 people (31 December 2025).

=== Ethnicity ===
Census 2021 (1+ %)
Ethnicity	Number	Fraction
Slovak	487	95.86%
Not found out	16	3.14%
Rusyn	10	1.96%
Total	508	

In year 2021 was 508 people by ethnicity 487 as Slovak, 16 as Not found out, 10 as Rusyn, 4 as German, 4 as Hungarian, 2 as Czech, 1 as Ukrainian, 1 as Romani and 1 as English.

Note on population: The difference values of population numbers in the table "Population statistic" and in the sections "Ethnicity" & "Religion" is caused by the use of various statistical methods.

=== Religion ===
Census 2021 (1+ %)
Religion	Number	Fraction
Roman Catholic Church	364	71.65%
None	72	14.17%
Greek Catholic Church	29	5.71%
Not found out	14	2.76%
Evangelical Church	14	2.76%
Calvinist Church	7	1.38%
Total	508	

In year 2021 was 508 people by religion 364 from Roman Catholic Church, 72 from None, 29 from Greek Catholic Church, 14 from Not found out, 14 from Evangelical Church, 7 from Calvinist Church, 5 from Ad hoc movements, 2 from Eastern Orthodox Church and 1 from Old Catholic Church.
