= Sady nad Torysou =

Sady nad Torysou Izdobabeszter
- Municipality
- Flag

- Location of Sady nad Torysou in the Košice Region Location of Sady nad Torysou in Slovakia
- Coordinates: 48.71°N 21.35°E
- Country: Slovakia
- Region: Košice Region
- District: Košice-okolie District
- First mentioned: 1964

Area
  - Total: 8.44 km^{2} (3.26 sq mi)
- Elevation: 204 m (669 ft)

Population (2025)
  - Total: 1,924
- Time zone: UTC+1 (CET)
  - Summer (DST): UTC+2 (CEST)
- Postal code: 444 1
- Area code: +421 55
- Vehicle registration plate (until 2022): KS
- Website: www.sadynadtorysou.sk

Sady nad Torysou (Hungarian: Izdobabeszter) is a new village and municipality in Košice-okolie District in the Kosice Region of eastern Slovakia.

== History ==
The municipality was established only in 1964. In fact, the village is formed by two localities: Byster and Zdoba. Byster (Hungarian: Beszter) and Zdoba (Hungarian: Izdoba), respectively first mentioned in 1332 (Bester), and in 1337 (Zdoba) in historical records belonged to Krásna pri Hornádom's Benedictine abbey. In 1337, German settlers established in Byster (Peyster).

== Geography ==
The municipality lies at an altitude of 204 metres (669 ft) and covers an area of 8.44 km^{2} (3.26 sq mi) (2025).

== Population ==
Population statistic (10 years)
| Year | 1995 | 2005 | 2015 | 2025 |
|---|---|---|---|---|
| Count | 1486 | 1705 | 1957 | 1924 |
| Difference | | +14.73% | +14.78% | −1.68% |

Population statistic
| Year | 2024 | 2025 |
|---|---|---|
| Count | 1925 | 1924 |
| Difference | | −0.05% |

It has a population of 1924 people (31 December 2025).

=== Ethnicity ===
Census 2021 (1+ %)
| Ethnicity | Number | Fraction |
|---|---|---|
| Slovak | 1776 | 90.42% |
| Not found out | 158 | 8.04% |
| Hungarian | 32 | 1.62% |
| Romani | 28 | 1.42% |
| Total | 1964 | |

In year 2021 was 1964 people by ethnicity 1776 as Slovak, 158 as Not found out, 32 as Hungarian, 28 as Romani, 17 as Rusyn, 6 as Czech, 6 as Ukrainian, 3 as Serbian, 2 as Polish, 2 as Greek, 1 as Jewish, 1 as Irish and 1 as Moravian.

Note on population: The difference values of population numbers in the table "Population statistic" and in the sections "Ethnicity" & "Religion" is caused by the use of various statistical methods.

=== Religion ===
Census 2021 (1+ %)
| Religion | Number | Fraction |
|---|---|---|
| Roman Catholic Church | 793 | 40.38% |
| Greek Catholic Church | 443 | 22.56% |
| None | 255 | 12.98% |
| Calvinist Church | 215 | 10.95% |
| Not found out | 175 | 8.91% |
| Evangelical Church | 42 | 2.14% |
| Total | 1964 | |

In year 2021 was 1964 people by religion 793 from Roman Catholic Church, 443 from Greek Catholic Church, 255 from None, 215 from Calvinist Church, 175 from Not found out, 42 from Evangelical Church, 15 from Eastern Orthodox Church, 13 from Apostolic Church, 5 from Ad hoc movements, 3 from Jehovah's Witnesses, 2 from Buddhism, 1 from Old Catholic Church, 1 from Other and not ascertained christian church and 1 from Seventh-day Adventist Church.
