= Gyňov =

Village and municipality in Slovakia

Gyňov Hernádgönyű
- Municipality
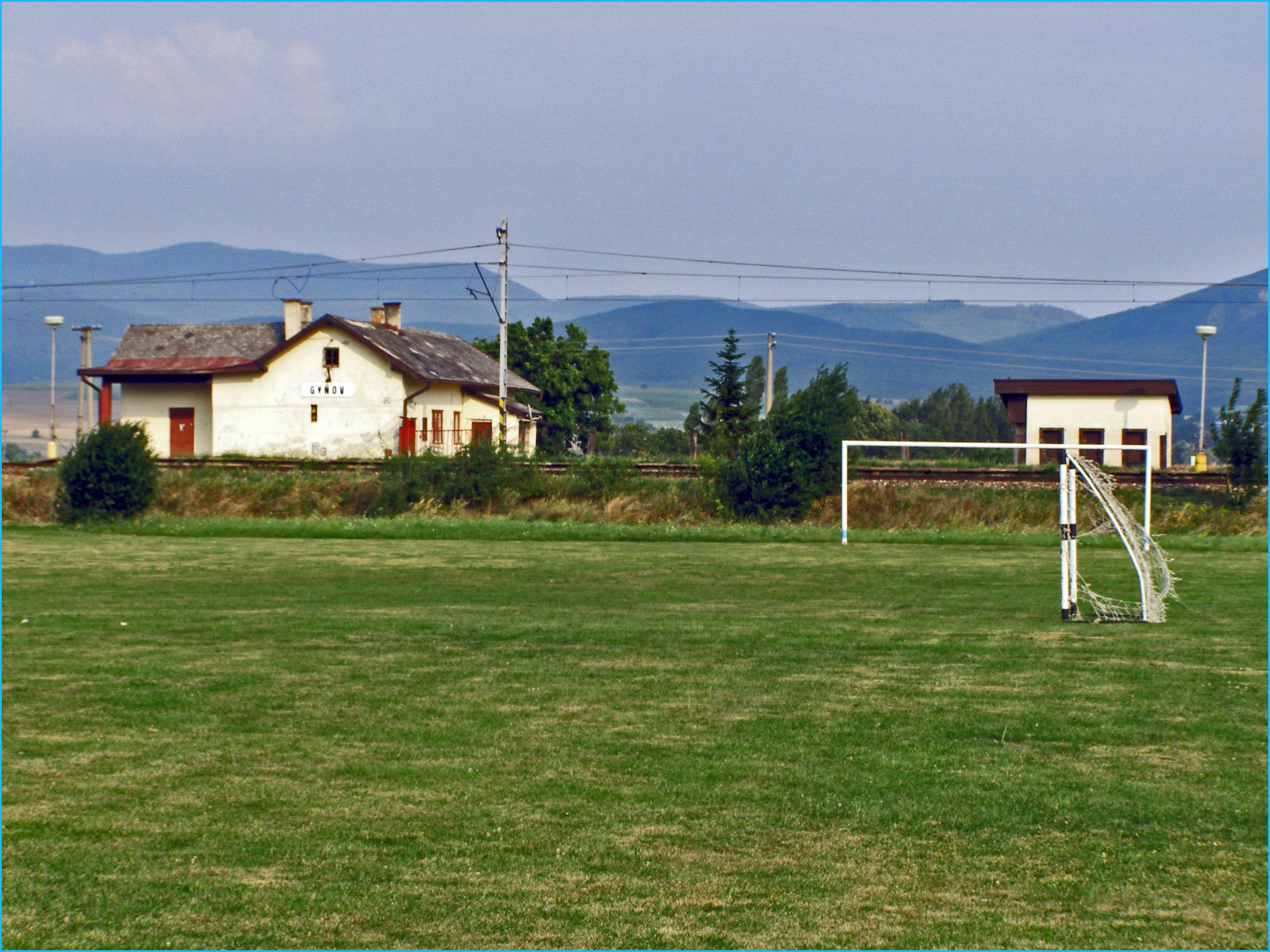

- Flag

- Location of Gyňov in the Košice Region Location of Gyňov in Slovakia
- Coordinates: 48.58°N 21.30°E
- Country: Slovakia
- Region: Košice Region
- District: Košice-okolie District
- First mentioned: 1255

Area
  - Total: 5.37 km^{2} (2.07 sq mi)
- Elevation: 171 m (561 ft)

Population (2025)
  - Total: 675
- Time zone: UTC+1 (CET)
  - Summer (DST): UTC+2 (CEST)
- Postal code: 441 4
- Area code: +421 55
- Vehicle registration plate (until 2022): KS
- Website: www.obecgynov.sk

Gyňov (Hungarian: Hernádgönyű) is a village and municipality in Košice-okolie District in the Kosice Region of eastern Slovakia.

== History ==
In historical records the village was first mentioned in 1255.

== Geography ==
The municipality lies at an altitude of 171 metres (561 ft) and covers an area of 5.37 km^{2} (2.07 sq mi) (2025).

== Population ==
Population statistic (10 years)
Year	1995	2005	2015	2025
Count	586	549	632	675
Difference		−6.31%	+15.11%	+6.80%

Population statistic
Year	2024	2025
Count	689	675
Difference		−2.03%

It has a population of 675 people (31 December 2025).

=== Ethnicity ===
Census 2021 (1+ %)
Ethnicity	Number	Fraction
Slovak	654	97.75%
Not found out	18	2.69%
Hungarian	7	1.04%
Total	669	

In year 2021 was 669 people by ethnicity 654 as Slovak, 18 as Not found out, 7 as Hungarian, 6 as Rusyn, 2 as Ukrainian, 1 as Moravian and 1 as English.

Note on population: The difference values of population numbers in the table "Population statistic" and in the sections "Ethnicity" & "Religion" is caused by the use of various statistical methods.

=== Religion ===
Census 2021 (1+ %)
Religion	Number	Fraction
Roman Catholic Church	497	74.29%
None	85	12.71%
Greek Catholic Church	30	4.48%
Calvinist Church	29	4.33%
Not found out	13	1.94%
Total	669	

In year 2021 was 669 people by religion 497 from Roman Catholic Church, 85 from None, 30 from Greek Catholic Church, 29 from Calvinist Church, 13 from Not found out, 6 from Eastern Orthodox Church, 4 from Evangelical Church, 2 from Christian Congregations in Slovakia, 2 from Ad hoc movements and 1 from Seventh-day Adventist Church.

== Genealogical resources ==
The records for genealogical research are available at the state archive "Statny Archiv in Kosice, Slovakia"

- Roman Catholic church records (births/marriages/deaths): 1787-1896 (parish B)
- Greek Catholic church records (births/marriages/deaths): 1791-1896 (parish B)
- Reformated church records (births/marriages/deaths): 1800-1895 (parish B)

== See also ==
- List of municipalities and towns in Slovakia
