= Bukovec, Košice-okolie District =

Bukovec Idabukóc
- Municipality
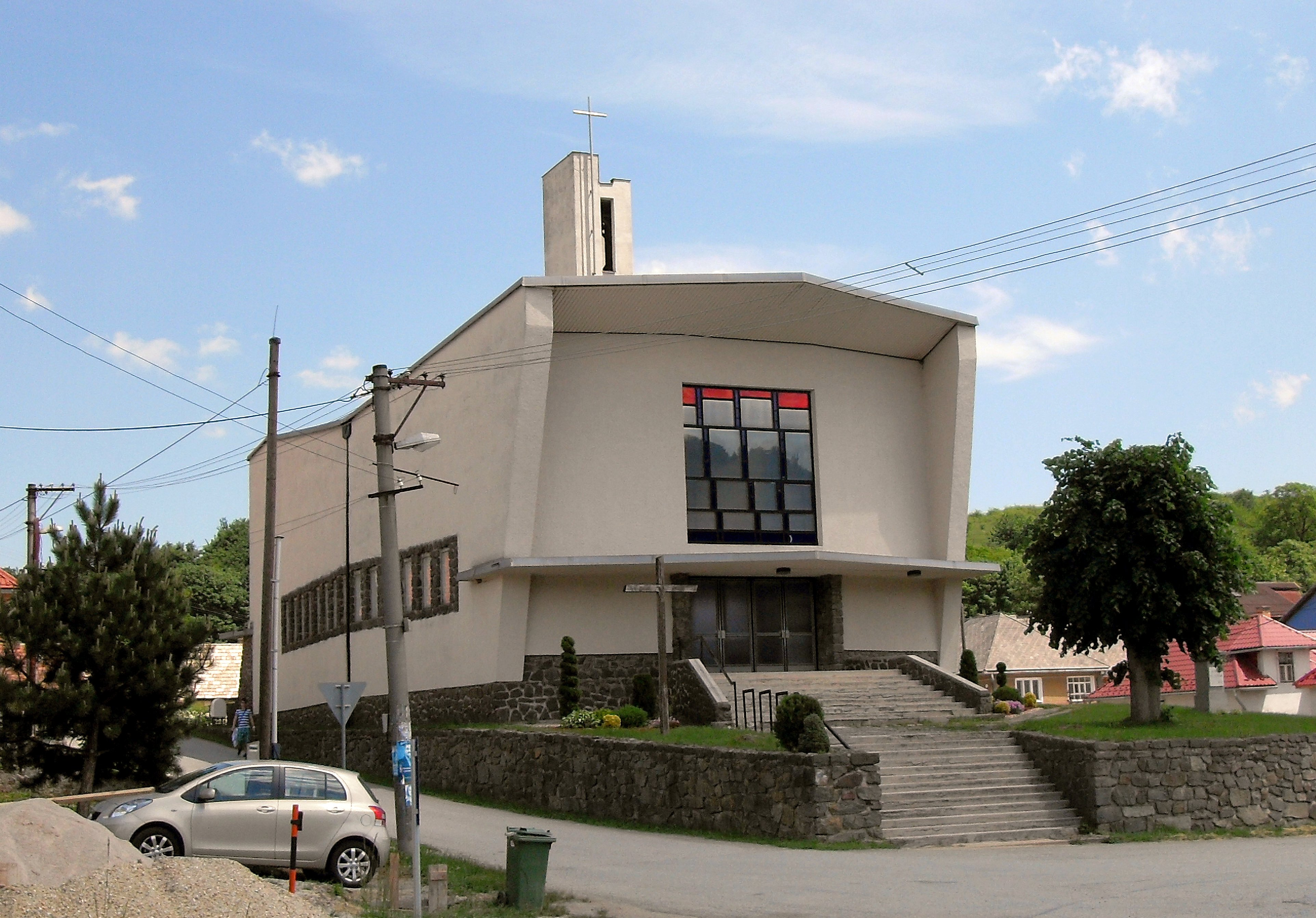

- Flag

- Location of Bukovec in the Košice Region Location of Bukovec in Slovakia
- Coordinates: 48.42°N 21.09°E
- Country: Slovakia
- Region: Košice Region
- District: Košice-okolie District
- First mentioned: 1609

Area
  - Total: 10.82 km^{2} (4.18 sq mi)
- Elevation: 351 m (1,152 ft)

Population (2025)
  - Total: 900
- Time zone: UTC+1 (CET)
  - Summer (DST): UTC+2 (CEST)
- Postal code: 442 0
- Area code: +421 55
- Vehicle registration plate (until 2022): KS
- Website: www.bukovec.sk

Bukovec (Hungarian: Idabukóc) is a village and municipality in Košice-okolie District in the Košice Region of eastern Slovakia.

== History ==
In historical records the village was first mentioned in 1609.

== Geography ==
The municipality lies at an altitude of 351 metres (1,152 ft) and covers an area of 10.82 km^{2} (4.18 sq mi) (2025).

== Population ==
Population statistic (10 years)
Year	1995	2005	2015	2025
Count	613	695	807	900
Difference		+13.37%	+16.11%	+11.52%

Population statistic
Year	2024	2025
Count	881	900
Difference		+2.15%

It has a population of 900 people (31 December 2025).

=== Ethnicity ===
Census 2021 (1+ %)
Ethnicity	Number	Fraction
Slovak	814	95.65%
Not found out	25	2.93%
Total	851	

In year 2021 was 851 people by ethnicity 814 as Slovak, 25 as Not found out, 7 as Rusyn, 7 as Hungarian, 4 as Czech, 3 as German, 2 as Russian, 2 as Other, 1 as Italian, 1 as Romani and 1 as Bulgarian.

Note on population: The difference values of population numbers in the table "Population statistic" and in the sections "Ethnicity" & "Religion" is caused by the use of various statistical methods.

=== Religion ===
Census 2021 (1+ %)
Religion	Number	Fraction
Roman Catholic Church	613	72.03%
None	166	19.51%
Not found out	22	2.59%
Greek Catholic Church	16	1.88%
Evangelical Church	13	1.53%
Total	851	

In year 2021 was 851 people by religion 613 from Roman Catholic Church, 166 from None, 22 from Not found out, 16 from Greek Catholic Church, 13 from Evangelical Church, 6 from Apostolic Church, 5 from Eastern Orthodox Church, 2 from Jehovah's Witnesses, 2 from Buddhism, 2 from Ad hoc movements, 1 from Calvinist Church, 1 from Other and not ascertained christian church, 1 from Christian Congregations in Slovakia and 1 from Other.

== Genealogical resources ==
The records for genealogical research are available at the state archive "Statny Archiv in Kosice, Slovakia"

- Roman Catholic church records (births/marriages/deaths): 1738-1896 (parish B)
- Greek Catholic church records (births/marriages/deaths): 1850-1911 (parish B)

== See also ==
- List of municipalities and towns in Slovakia
