= Mokrance =

Municipality of Slovakia

Mokrance Makranc
- Municipality
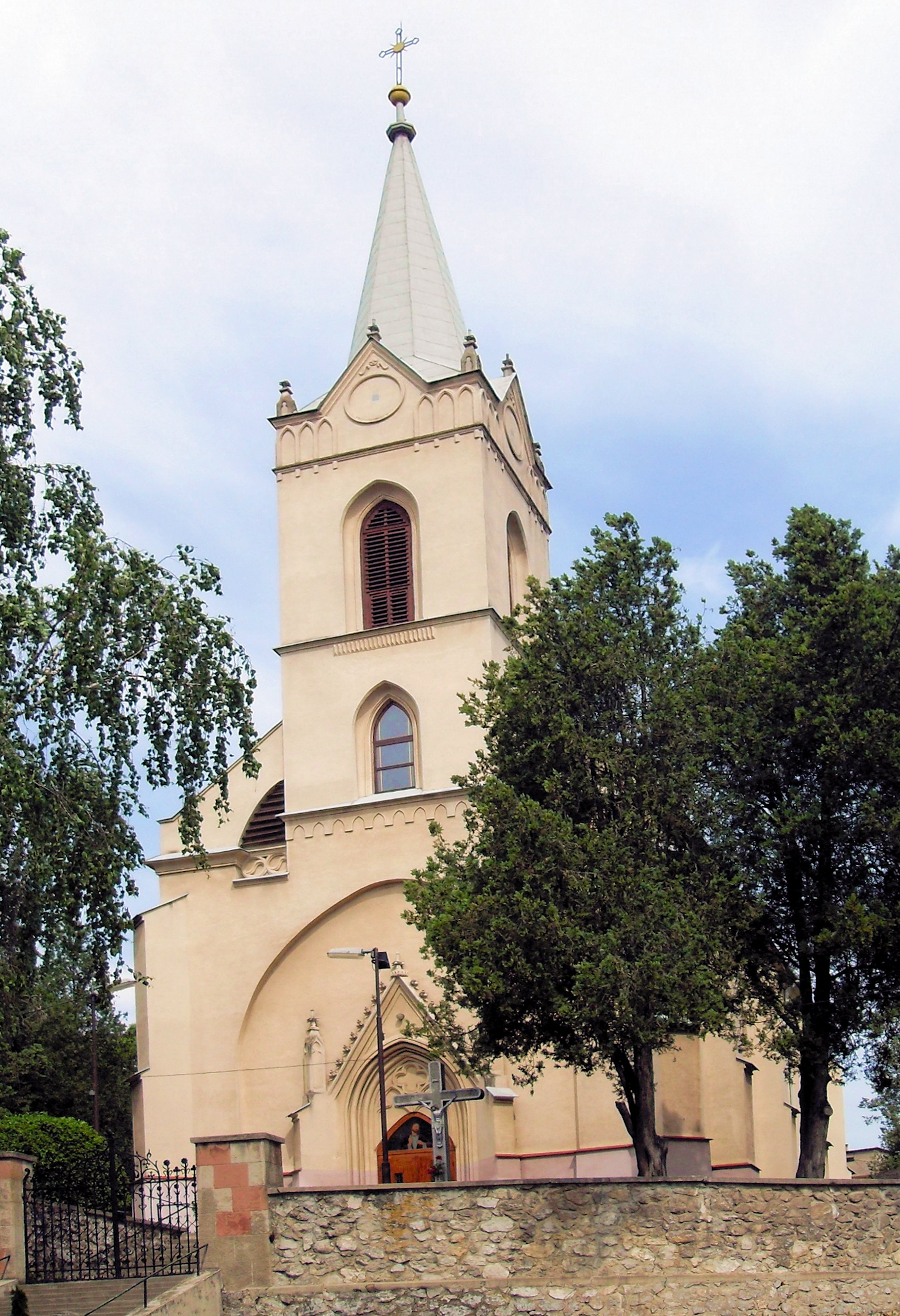

- Flag

- Location of Mokrance in the Košice Region Location of Mokrance in Slovakia
- Coordinates: 48.60°N 21.03°E
- Country: Slovakia
- Region: Košice Region
- District: Košice-okolie District
- First mentioned: 1317

Area
  - Total: 23.41 km^{2} (9.04 sq mi)
- Elevation: 200 m (660 ft)

Population (2025)
  - Total: 1,586
- Time zone: UTC+1 (CET)
  - Summer (DST): UTC+2 (CEST)
- Postal code: 450 1
- Area code: +421 55
- Vehicle registration plate (until 2022): KS
- Website: www.mokrance.sk

Mokrance (Hungarian: Makranc) is a village and municipality in Košice-okolie District in the Kosice Region of eastern Slovakia.

== History ==
In historical records, the village was first mentioned in 1317.

== Geography ==
The municipality lies at an altitude of 200 metres (660 ft) and covers an area of 23.41 km^{2} (9.04 sq mi) (2025).

== Population ==
Population statistic (10 years)
Year	1995	2005	2015	2025
Count	1278	1354	1365	1586
Difference		+5.94%	+0.81%	+16.19%

Population statistic
Year	2024	2025
Count	1563	1586
Difference		+1.47%

It has a population of 1586 people (31 December 2025).

=== Ethnicity ===
Census 2021 (1+ %)
Ethnicity	Number	Fraction
Slovak	1065	77.9%
Hungarian	464	33.94%
Not found out	24	1.75%
Total	1367	

In year 2021 was 1367 people by ethnicity 1065 as Slovak, 464 as Hungarian, 24 as Not found out, 5 as German, 4 as Czech, 3 as Rusyn, 3 as Other, 2 as Italian, 2 as Russian, 1 as Romani and 1 as Moravian.

Note on population: The difference values of population numbers in the table "Population statistic" and in the sections "Ethnicity" & "Religion" is caused by the use of various statistical methods.

=== Religion ===
Census 2021 (1+ %)
Religion	Number	Fraction
Roman Catholic Church	1139	83.32%
None	128	9.36%
Calvinist Church	26	1.9%
Not found out	22	1.61%
Greek Catholic Church	21	1.54%
Total	1367	

In year 2021 was 1367 people by religion 1139 from Roman Catholic Church, 128 from None, 26 from Calvinist Church, 22 from Not found out, 21 from Greek Catholic Church, 10 from Evangelical Church, 6 from Seventh-day Adventist Church, 3 from Other, 3 from Buddhism, 3 from Ad hoc movements, 2 from Other and not ascertained christian church, 2 from Apostolic Church, 1 from Paganism and natural spirituality and 1 from Jehovah's Witnesses.
