= Turna =

Turna or Turňa may refer to:

== Turňa ==
- Turňa (river), a river in Slovakia
- Turňa nad Bodvou, a village and municipality in Slovakia
  - Turňa Castle, in Turňa nad Bodvou
- The Slavic name for Torna County, Kingdom of Hungary

== Turna ==
- "Turna" (song), a Turkish and Greek folk song
- Turna, Mengen, a village in Bolu Province, Turkey
- Turna, Kardzhali Province, a village in Bulgaria
- Turna, Poland, a village in Węgrów County
- Turna, Kamboja (Kamboja) people clan of Punjab

== See also ==
- Torna (disambiguation)
