= Toran =

Toran may refer to:

- Torana, a free-standing ornamental or arched gateway in Hindu, Buddhist and Jain architecture
- Toran (art), a decorative door hanging
  - Toranam, in South India
- Toran (Pashtun tribe)
- Taro, a tropical plant
- Thoranam (film), 1987 Indian film
- Thoran, Mawal, a village in Maharashtra, India

== See also ==
- Turan (disambiguation)
- Torna (disambiguation)
- Thoranai, a 2009 Indian film by Sabha Ayyappan
- Thoranayudham, a Kathakali (classical Indian dance) play
- "Thoranthu Vacha Puthagm", a song from the 2011 Indian film Karuvarai Pookkal
