= Vyšný Medzev =

Vyšný Medzev Obermetzenseifen
- Municipality
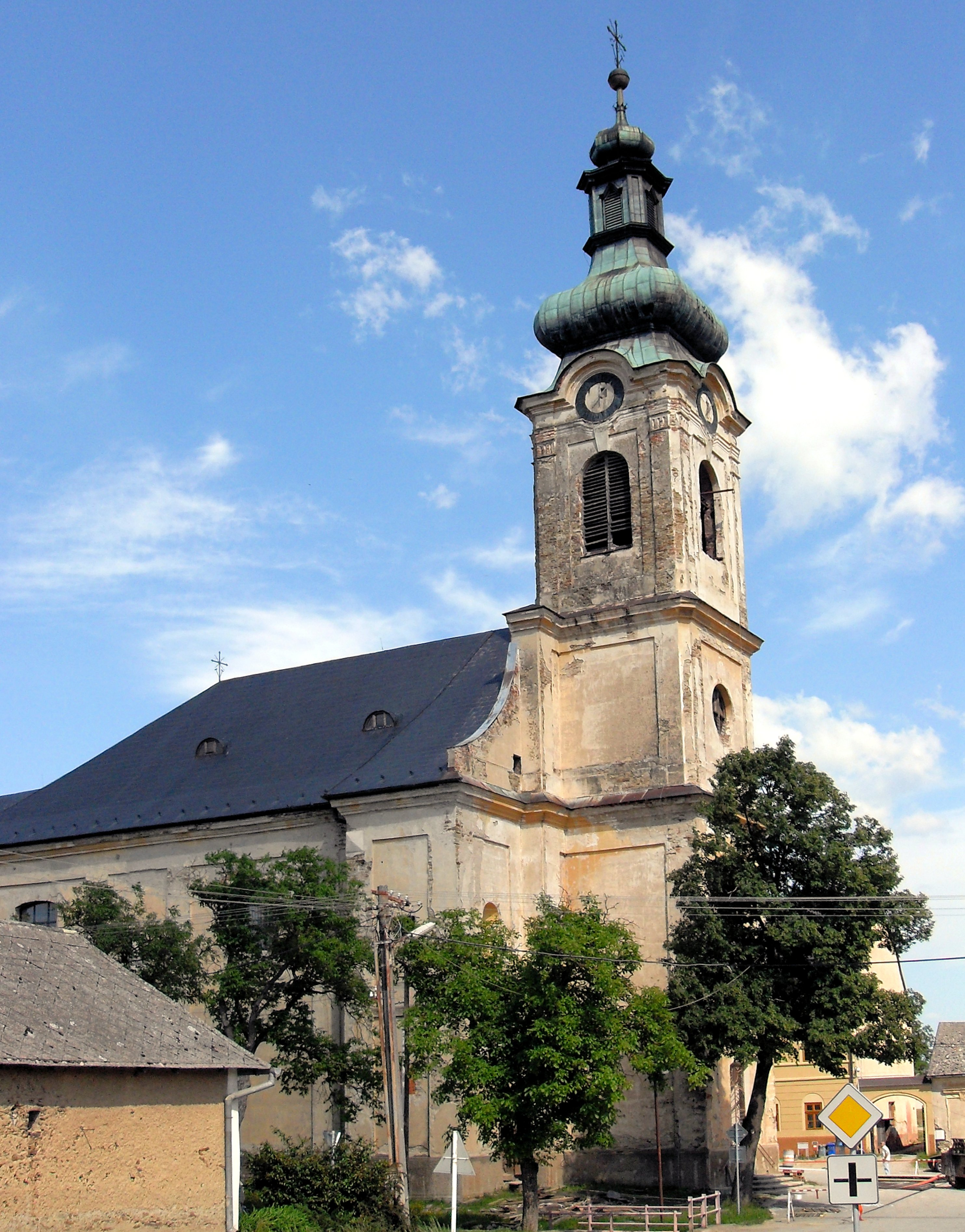
- Church of Saint Mary Magdalene

- Flag

- Location of Vyšný Medzev in the Košice Region Location of Vyšný Medzev in Slovakia
- Coordinates: 48.72°N 20.91°E
- Country: Slovakia
- Region: Košice Region
- District: Košice-okolie District
- First mentioned: 1427

Area
  - Total: 0.00 km^{2} (0 sq mi)
- Elevation: 387 m (1,270 ft)

Population (2025)
  - Total: 576
- Time zone: UTC+1 (CET)
  - Summer (DST): UTC+2 (CEST)
- Postal code: 442 5
- Area code: +421 55
- Vehicle registration plate (until 2022): KS
- Website: www.vysnymedzev.sk

Vyšný Medzev (German: Obermetzenseifen; Hungarian: Felsőmecenzéf) is a village and municipality of Košice-okolie District in the Košice Region of eastern Slovakia. It is one of several towns in Bodva Valley. Other towns in Bodva Valley include: Jasov, Lucia Bania, Medzev (Metzenseifen), and Stos.

== History ==
It seems almost a certainty, that the farmers, especially those from Thuringia from “Das Dörfl”, moved to Vyšný Medzev ("Upper Metzenseifen"), or then named German: Obermetzenseifen, during the first lineage of farmers and as a minority compared to the miners, whose home lies in the Bodwa Valley in Medzev, or then known as German: Metzenseifen. Until 1427, there was a mere mention of a town in the Jasov monastery's documents (Kauer, J. et al. 1986). It is no wonder then, that the Premonstratensian Order—the "white" fathers—assumed religious control of this area. They favored the "Obere Ort" most likely due to the good relationship between the monastery in Jasov and its near proximity to the Lucia Mountain Mine.

The contract, related to the mentioned town in 1427, was signed by the abbot of the monastery in Jasov on October 21, 1430. The vicar Johann from Vyšný Medzev, the judge Michael Swrger (later Schürger), the sworn in Hannus Nykel, Closperges and Cristan Lewberth and other invited townsmen were present at the signing.

== Geography ==
The municipality lies at an altitude of 387 metres (1,270 ft) and covers an area of 0.00 km^{2} (0 sq mi) (2025).

== Population ==
Population statistic (10 years)
Year	1995	2005	2015	2025
Count	0	533	516	576
Difference		–	−3.18%	+11.62%

Population statistic
Year	2024	2025
Count	551	576
Difference		+4.53%

It has a population of 576 people (31 December 2025).

=== Ethnicity ===
Census 2021 (1+ %)
Ethnicity	Number	Fraction
Slovak	476	91.18%
Romani	57	10.91%
German	55	10.53%
Not found out	26	4.98%
Hungarian	8	1.53%
Total	522	

In year 2021 was 522 people by ethnicity 476 as Slovak, 57 as Romani, 55 as German, 26 as Not found out, 8 as Hungarian, 4 as Czech, 2 as Rusyn, 2 as Other, 1 as Jewish, 1 as Ukrainian and 1 as English.

Note on population: The difference values of population numbers in the table "Population statistic" and in the sections "Ethnicity" & "Religion" is caused by the use of various statistical methods.

=== Religion ===
Census 2021 (1+ %)
Religion	Number	Fraction
Roman Catholic Church	321	61.49%
None	152	29.12%
Not found out	21	4.02%
Greek Catholic Church	15	2.87%
Total	522	

In year 2021 was 522 people by religion 321 from Roman Catholic Church, 152 from None, 21 from Not found out, 15 from Greek Catholic Church, 5 from Evangelical Church, 3 from Calvinist Church, 3 from Jehovah's Witnesses, 1 from Jewish community and 1 from Christian Congregations in Slovakia.
