= Ida (river) =

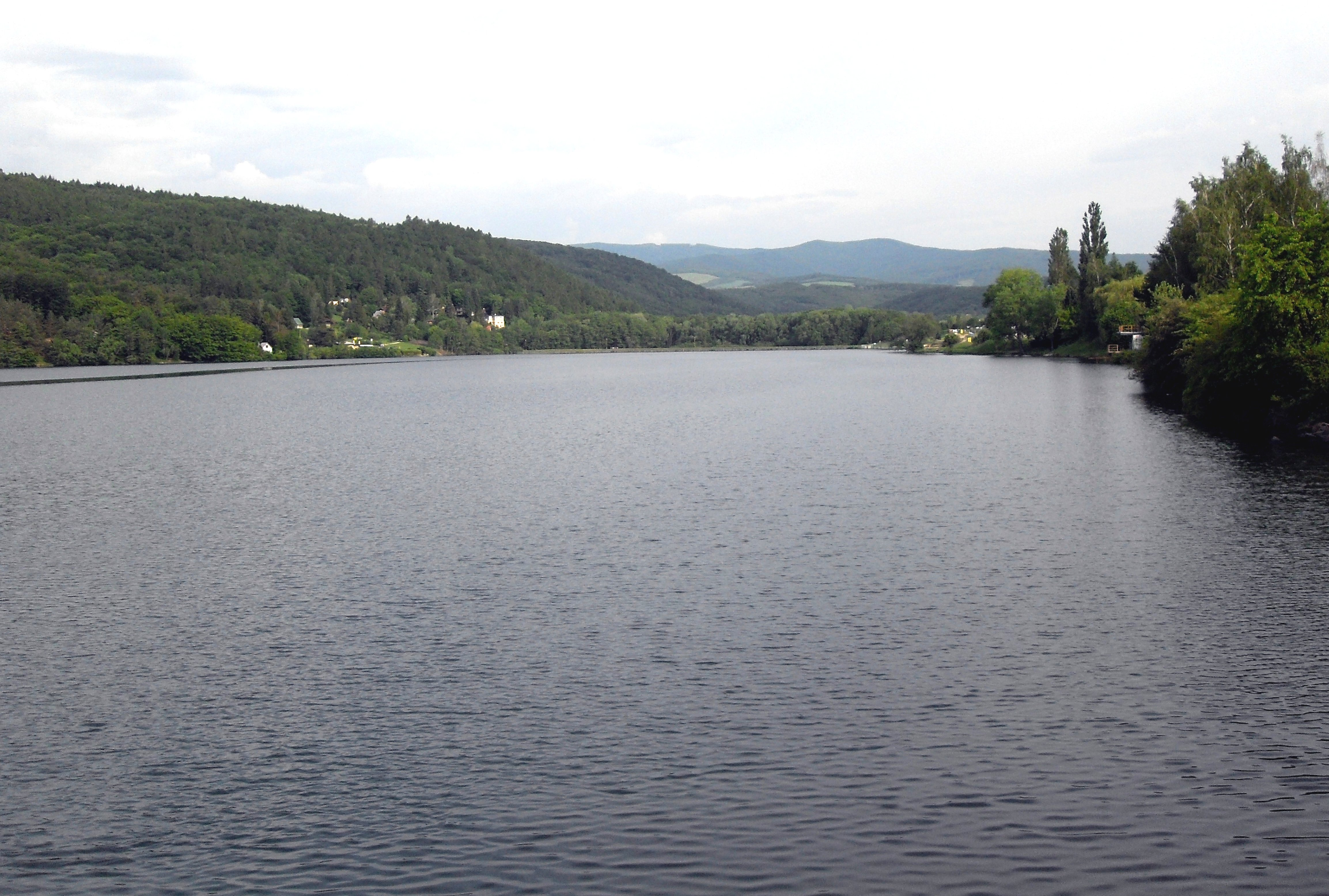

Location
- Country: Slovakia

Physical characteristics
- Mouth
  - location: Bodva
  - coordinates: 48.5714°N 20.9397°E
- Length: 51.5 km (32.0 mi)
- Basin size: 381 km^{2} (147 sq mi)

Basin features
- Progression: Bodva→ Sajó→ Tisza→ Danube→ Black Sea

The Ida is a left tributary of the river Bodva in eastern Slovakia. It flows into the Bodva in the village Peder. It is 51.5 km (32.0 mi) long and its basin size is 381 km^{2} (147 sq mi).
