= Jasov =

Jasov Jászó
- Municipality
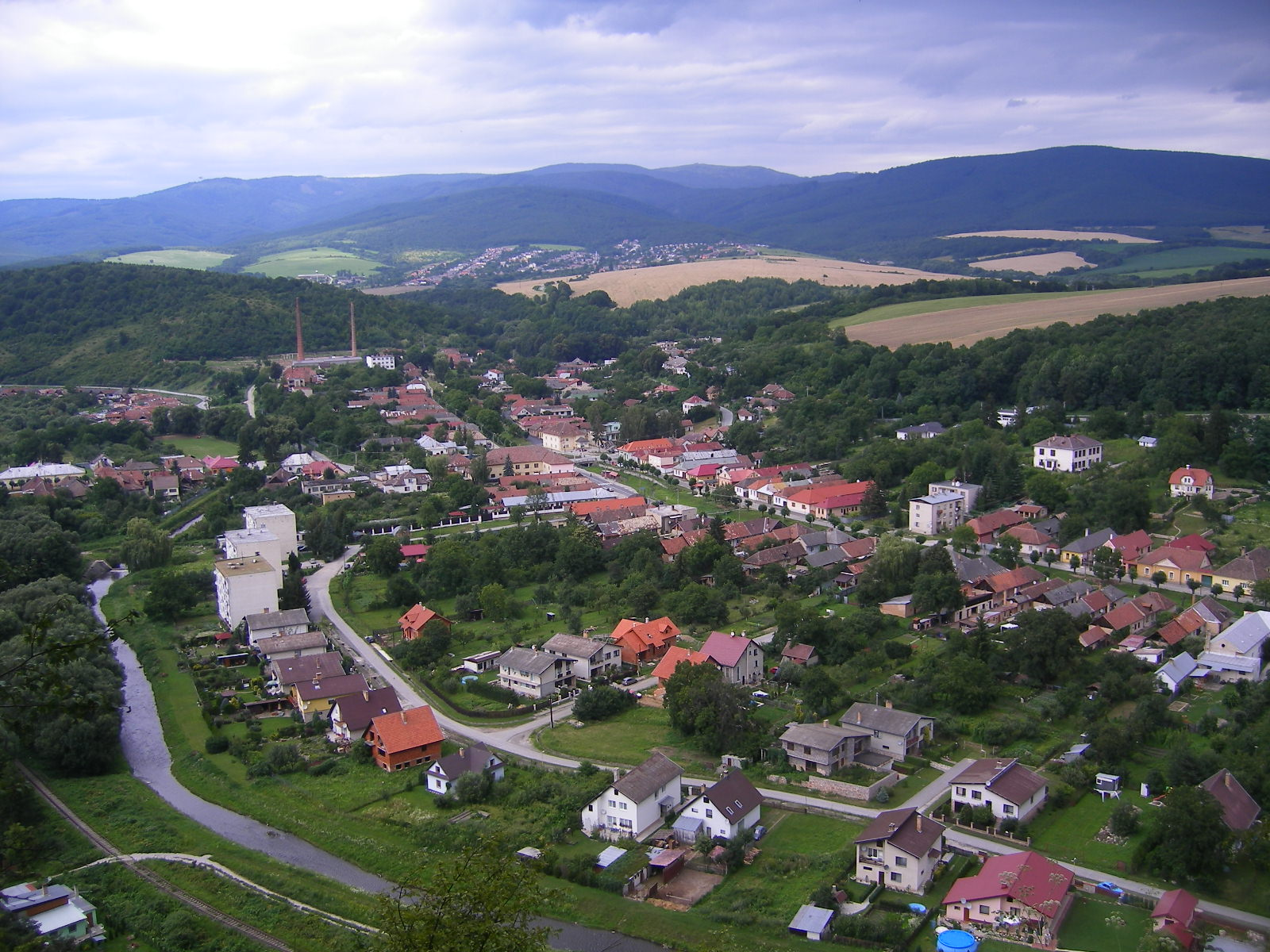
- View of the village from the Jasovská Skala

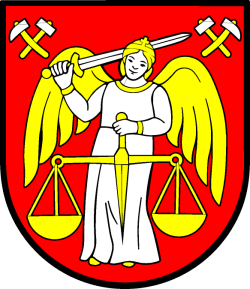
- Flag Coat of arms

- Location of Jasov in the Košice Region Location of Jasov in Slovakia
- Coordinates: 48.68°N 20.98°E
- Country: Slovakia
- Region: Košice Region
- District: Košice-okolie District
- First mentioned: 1234

Area
  - Total: 35.41 km^{2} (13.67 sq mi)
- Elevation: 263 m (863 ft)

Population (2025)
  - Total: 3,803
- Time zone: UTC+1 (CET)
  - Summer (DST): UTC+2 (CEST)
- Postal code: 442 3
- Area code: +421 55
- Vehicle registration plate (until 2022): KS
- Website: www.jasov.sk

Jasov (German: Joß; Hungarian: Jászó) is a small town and municipality in Košice-okolie District in the Kosice Region of eastern Slovakia. It is one of several towns in Bodva Valley. Other towns in Bodva Valley include: Lucia Bania, Medzev (Metzenseifen), Vyšný Medzev (Upper Metzenseifen), and Stos.

== History ==
Historically, the village was first mentioned in 1234.

== St John The Baptist Church ==
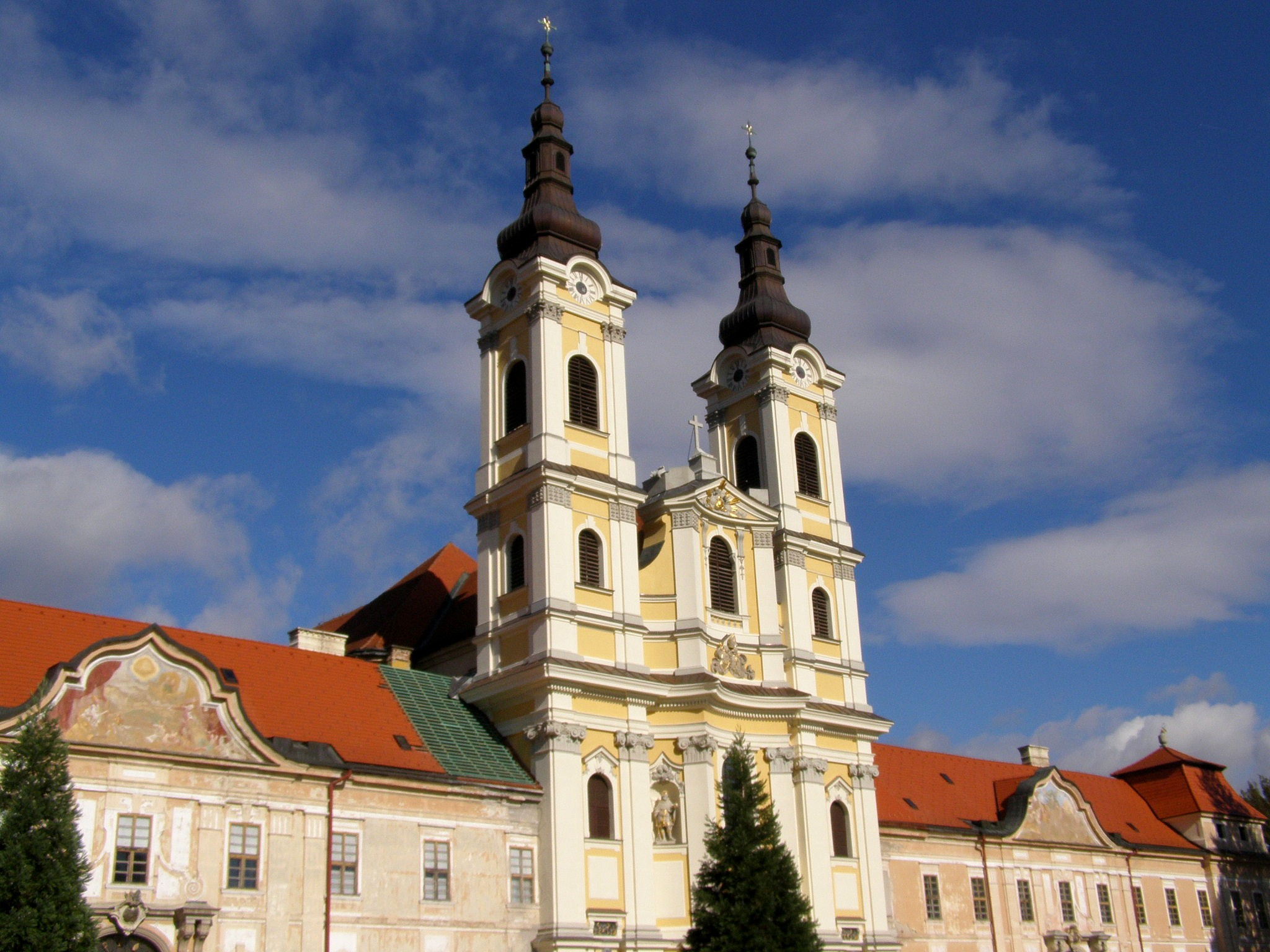
Premonstratensian monastery

This is the biggest monastery complex in Slovakia and the St John The Baptist church, which forms its centrepiece, is considered one of the country's most important late-Baroque buildings.

Though the present complex dates unquestionably from the 18th century, there has been a monastery here since 1170. The first, probably made of wood, was destroyed by the invading Tatars in 1242. A Romanesque stone monastery soon replaced it and was rebuilt in a fortified style in the 15th century. The site was then completely levelled again in the 18th century to make way for the present Baroque structure. The monastery has 365 windows, 12 chimneys and four gates (representing the days, months and seasons of the year).

== Geography ==
The municipality lies at an altitude of 263 metres (863 ft) and covers an area of 35.41 km^{2} (13.67 sq mi) (2025).

Jasov lies on the edge of the Slovenský Kras, an area of dramatic limestone (or karst) landscapes. The nearby valley between Moldava nad Bodvou and Rožňava, with its wide bottom, high cliffs and a picturesque gorge (at Zádiel), is typical.

But karst landscapes are noted for what lies beneath their surface as much as what can be seen above, and the Slovenský Kras is no exception. The area is littered with cave complexes, several of them open to the public. One of these is in the hillside a short distance from the monastery at Jasov.

== Population ==
Population statistic (10 years)
Year	1995	2005	2015	2025
Count	2458	2888	3526	3803
Difference		+17.49%	+22.09%	+7.85%

Population statistic
Year	2024	2025
Count	3740	3803
Difference		+1.68%

It has a population of 3803 people (31 December 2025).

=== Ethnicity ===
Census 2021 (1+ %)
Ethnicity	Number	Fraction
Slovak	2531	71.59%
Romani	1030	29.13%
Not found out	821	23.22%
Hungarian	244	6.9%
Total	3535	

In year 2021 was 3535 people by ethnicity 2531 as Slovak, 1030 as Romani, 821 as Not found out, 244 as Hungarian, 10 as Czech, 5 as Rusyn, 4 as German, 4 as Other, 2 as Russian, 1 as Jewish, 1 as Vietnamese, 1 as Ukrainian, 1 as Greek and 1 as Croatian.

Note on population: The difference values of population numbers in the table "Population statistic" and in the sections "Ethnicity" & "Religion" is caused by the use of various statistical methods.

=== Religion ===
Census 2021 (1+ %)
Religion	Number	Fraction
Roman Catholic Church	1839	52.02%
Not found out	935	26.45%
None	572	16.18%
Greek Catholic Church	49	1.39%
Calvinist Church	36	1.02%
Total	3535	

In year 2021 was 3535 people by religion 1839 from Roman Catholic Church, 935 from Not found out, 572 from None, 49 from Greek Catholic Church, 36 from Calvinist Church, 35 from Christian Congregations in Slovakia, 34 from Evangelical Church, 9 from Eastern Orthodox Church, 8 from Jehovah's Witnesses, 7 from Other and not ascertained christian church, 3 from Other, 3 from Ad hoc movements, 1 from Old Catholic Church, 1 from Islam, 1 from Hinduism, 1 from United Methodist Church and 1 from Apostolic Church.

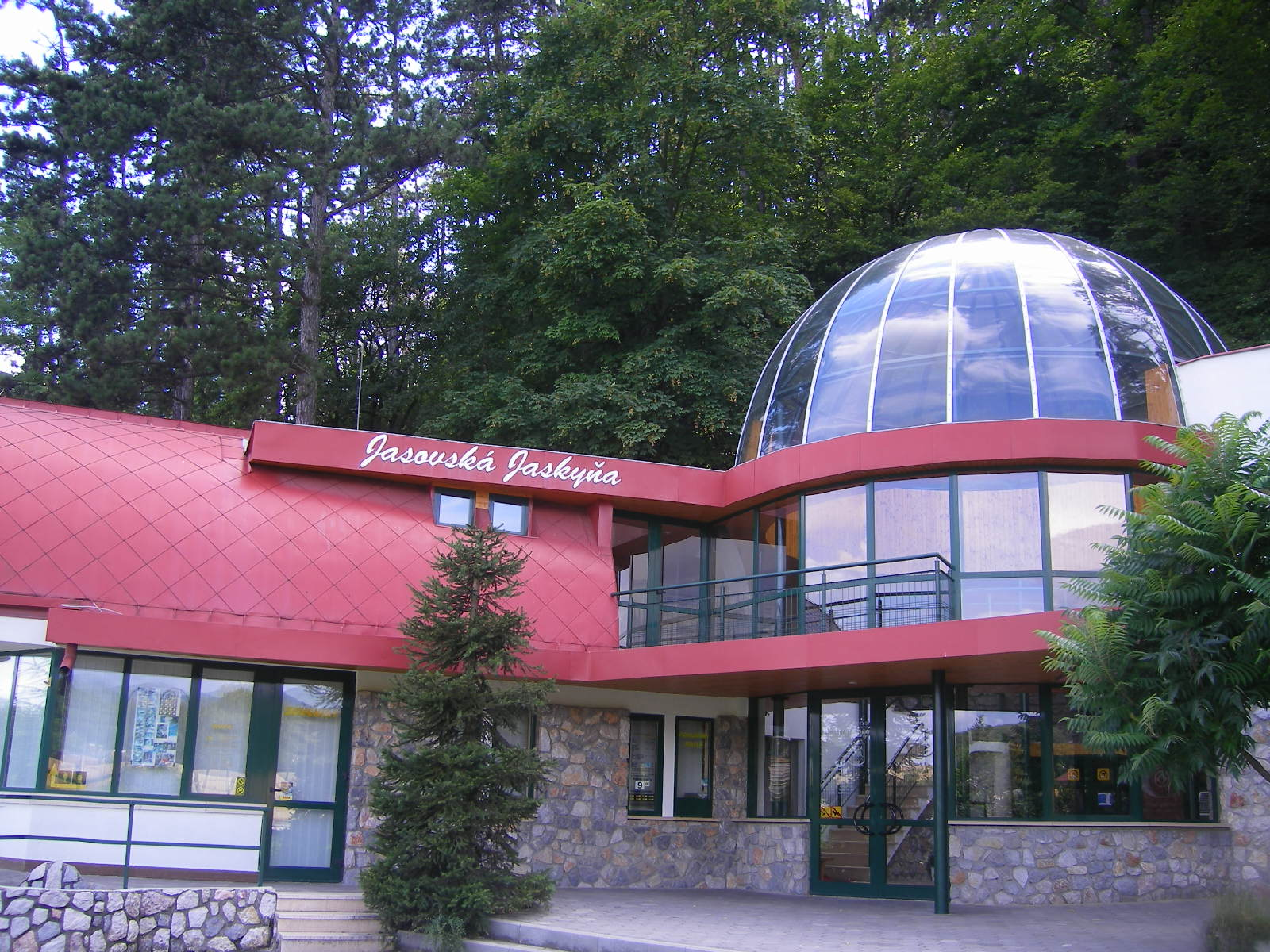
Entrance to the Jasovs' Cave

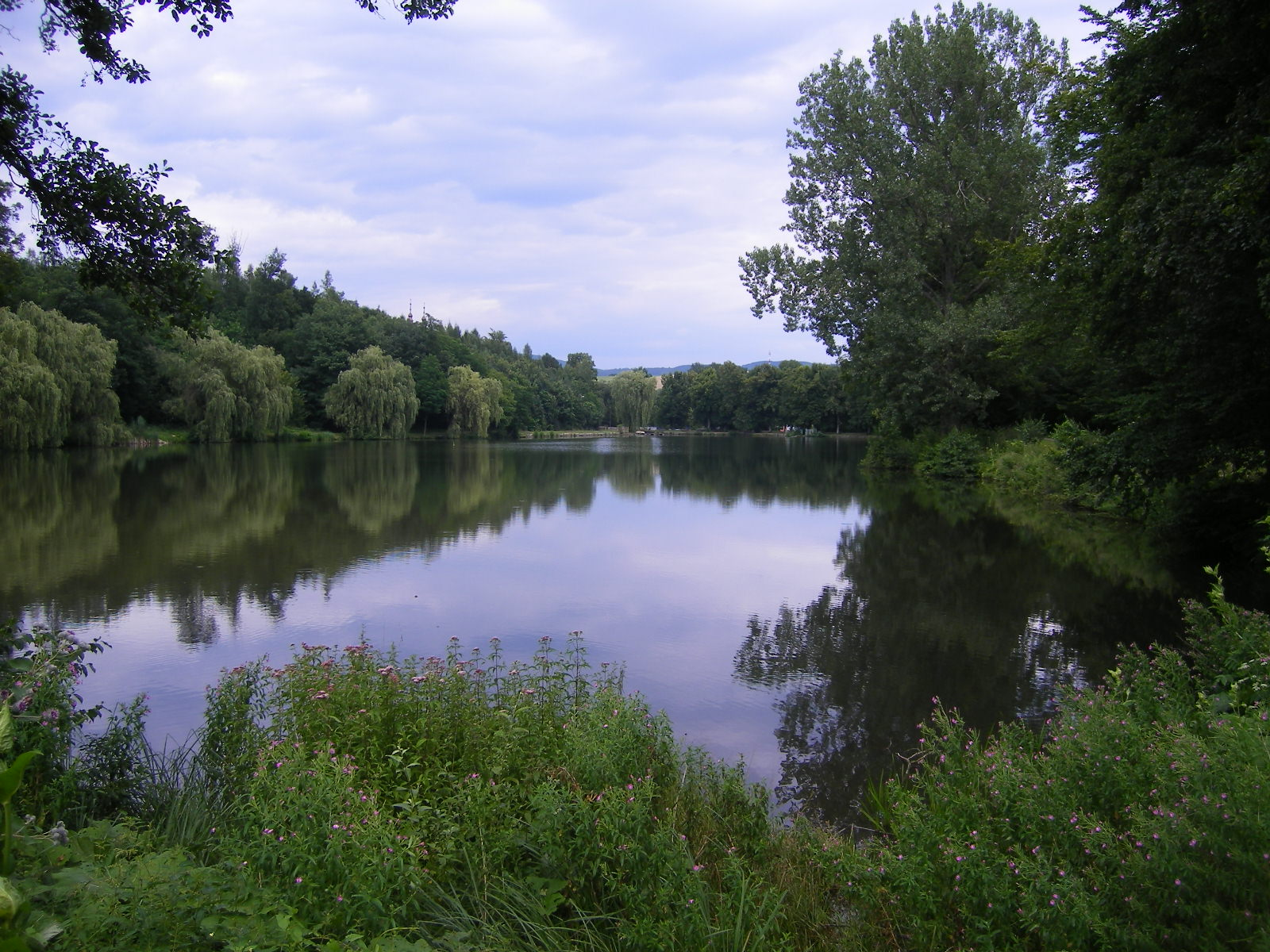
Jasovs' Pond

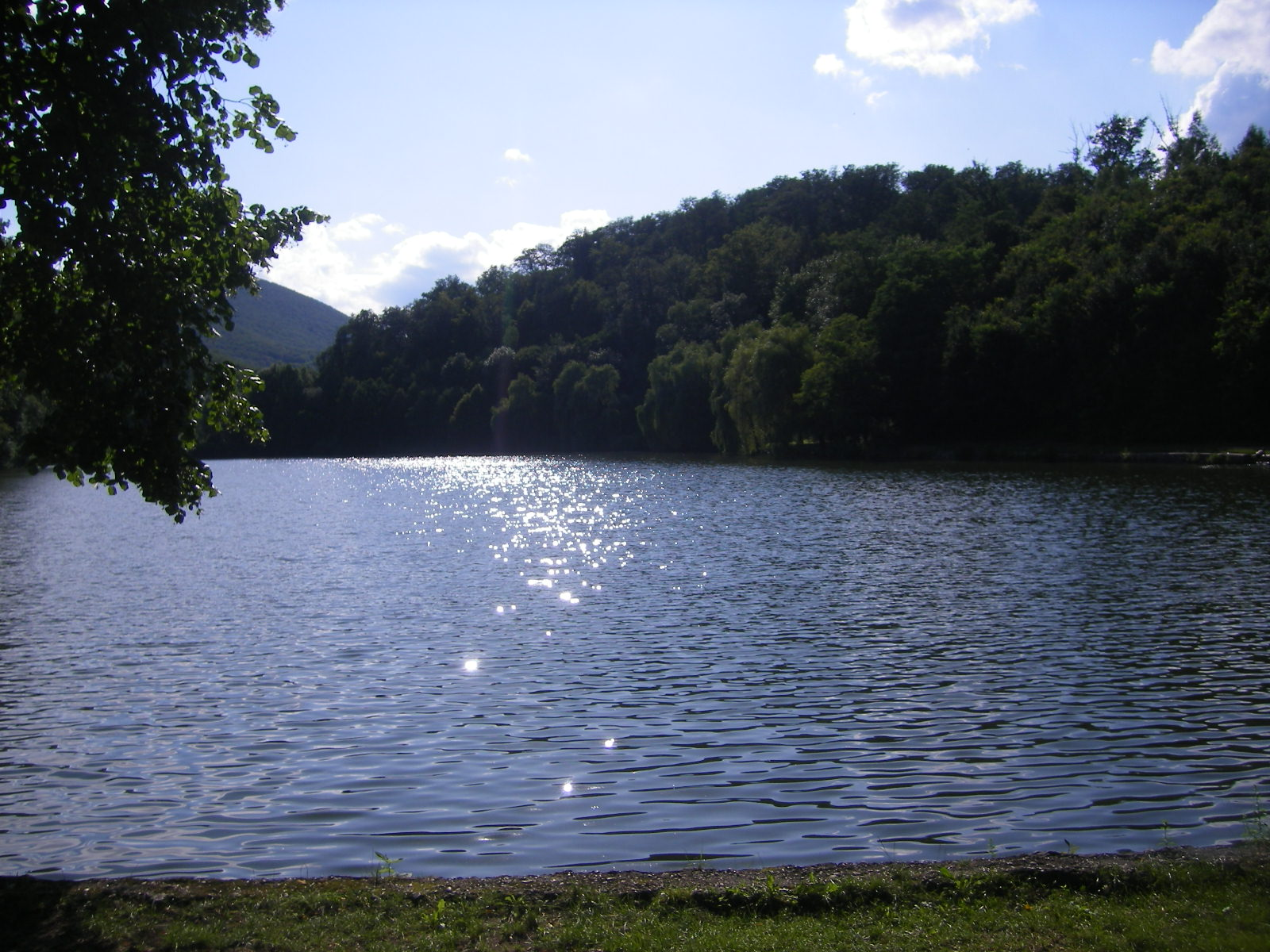
Jasovs' Pond 2

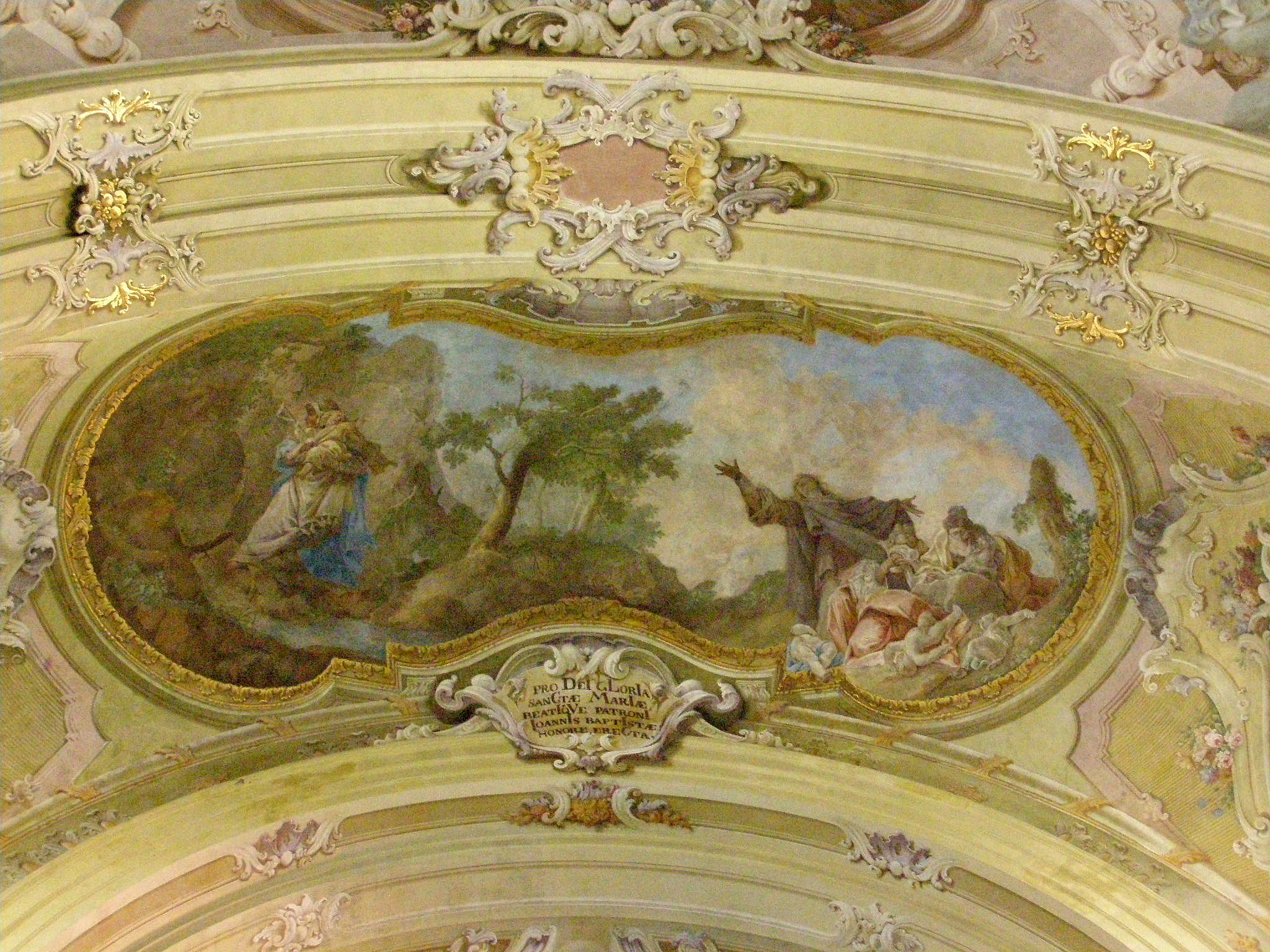
Monastery inside

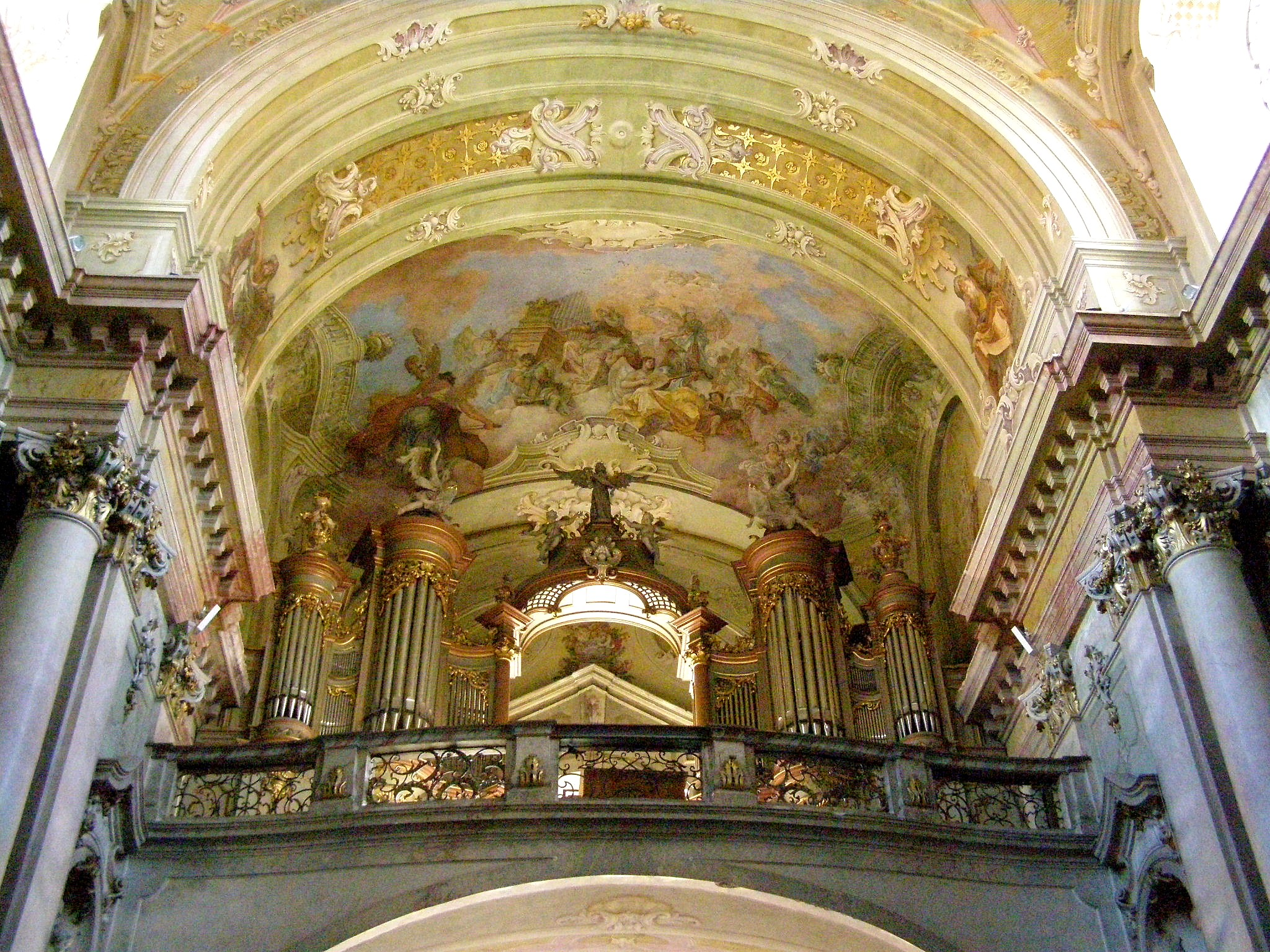
Monastery inside 2

== Twin towns ==
Tura, Hungary

== Genealogical resources ==
The records for genealogical research are available at the state archive "Statny Archiv in Kosice, Slovakia"

- Roman Catholic church records (births/marriages/deaths): 1679-1911 (parish A)
- Greek Catholic church records (births/marriages/deaths): 1870-1902 (parish B)
- Reformated church records (births/marriages/deaths): 1727-1904 (parish B)

== See also ==
- List of municipalities and towns in Slovakia
