= Torna =

Torna may refer to:

Given name of Irish writers

- Torna Éices, legendary 5th-century poet
- Torna Ó Maolconaire (died 1468), Irish poet and historian
- Torna, pen name of Tadhg Ó Donnchadha (1874–1949) Irish-language writer, academic and activist

Surname

- Nikita Torna, possible Hungarian name of Enrico Tamberlik (1820–1889), an Italian tenor
- Oscar Törnå (1842–1894), Swedish artist

Places

- Turňa (disambiguation), Slovak placename which is Torna in Hungarian, the local minority language
  - Torna County, of the former Kingdom of Hungary
- Torna Fort in Pune District, Maharashtra, India
- Torna Hundred, administrative division of Skåne, Sweden

Other

- Torna! (i.e. "Come Back!"), a 1953 Italian film
- Torna (moth), a synonym of Compsoctena
- Torna or torana, a free-standing ornamental or arched gateway in South and East Asia
- Xenoblade Chronicles 2: Torna ~ The Golden Country, a 2018 video game

== See also ==
- Toran (disambiguation)
