= Štós =

Štós Stósz
- Municipality
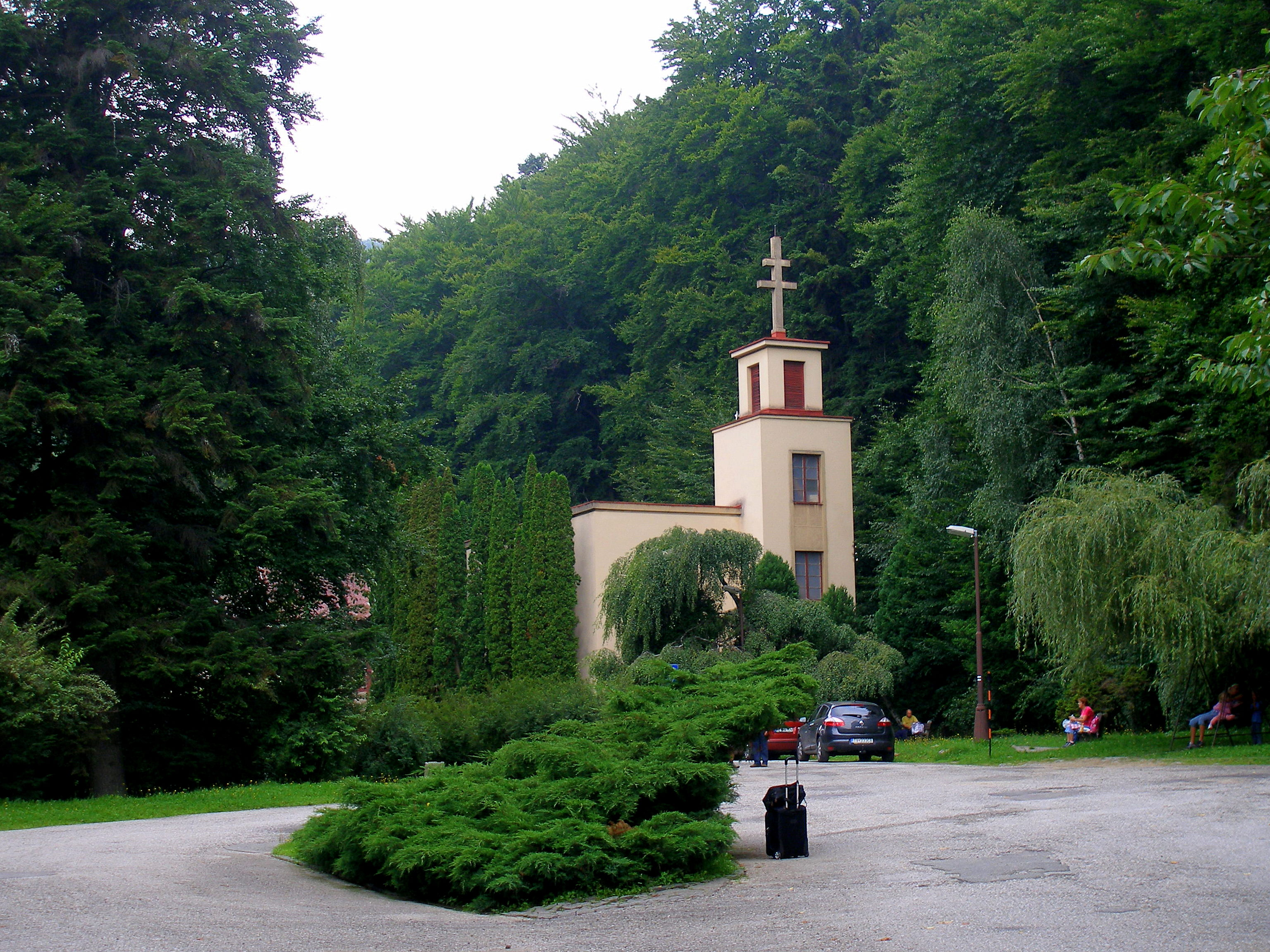

- Flag

- Location of Štós in the Košice Region Location of Štós in Slovakia
- Coordinates: 48.71°N 20.79°E
- Country: Slovakia
- Region: Košice Region
- District: Košice-okolie District
- First mentioned: 1341

Area
  - Total: 31.35 km^{2} (12.10 sq mi)
- Elevation: 516 m (1,693 ft)

Population (2025)
  - Total: 728
- Time zone: UTC+1 (CET)
  - Summer (DST): UTC+2 (CEST)
- Postal code: 442 6
- Area code: +421 55
- Vehicle registration plate (until 2022): KS
- Website: www.stos.sk

Štós (before 1973 Štos; German: Stoß, earlier Stoos; Hungarian: Stósz, earlier Soosz, in the Middle Ages Hegyalja) is a village and municipality in Košice-okolie District in the Košice Region of eastern Slovakia. It is one of several towns in Bodva Valley. Other towns in Bodva Valley include: Jasov, Lucia Bania, Medzev (Metzenseifen), and Vyšný Medzev (Upper Metzenseifen).

== Geography ==
The municipality lies at an altitude of 516 metres (1,693 ft) and covers an area of 31.35 km^{2} (12.10 sq mi) (2025).

== History ==
The village developed from an old Slav mining settlement. After the Mongol invasion of 1241, the depopulated region was resettled by German settlers. The place-name derives from the German family name Stoss. In 1341 many privileges were given to German miners. The village passed to Jasov and in 1427 to Smolník. After that, it belonged to the local lord Ján Baglos. In 1449 Johann Kistner from Štitník gave his part of the village to Carthusian monastery of the Spiš County.

== Population ==
Population statistic (10 years)
Year	1995	2005	2015	2025
Count	778	762	742	728
Difference		−2.05%	−2.62%	−1.88%

Population statistic
Year	2024	2025
Count	747	728
Difference		−2.54%

It has a population of 728 people (31 December 2025).

=== Ethnicity ===
Census 2021 (1+ %)
Ethnicity	Number	Fraction
Slovak	640	86.83%
German	70	9.49%
Not found out	61	8.27%
Romani	31	4.2%
Hungarian	8	1.08%
Total	737	

In year 2021 was 737 people by ethnicity 640 as Slovak, 70 as German, 61 as Not found out, 31 as Romani, 8 as Hungarian, 5 as Czech, 3 as Other, 2 as Rusyn, 1 as Ukrainian, 1 as Polish and 1 as Albanian.

Note on population: The difference values of population numbers in the table "Population statistic" and in the sections "Ethnicity" & "Religion" is caused by the use of various statistical methods.

=== Religion ===
Census 2021 (1+ %)
Religion	Number	Fraction
Roman Catholic Church	466	63.23%
None	139	18.86%
Not found out	53	7.19%
Evangelical Church	40	5.43%
Greek Catholic Church	16	2.17%
Christian Congregations in Slovakia	13	1.76%
Total	737	

In year 2021 was 737 people by religion 466 from Roman Catholic Church, 139 from None, 53 from Not found out, 40 from Evangelical Church, 16 from Greek Catholic Church, 13 from Christian Congregations in Slovakia, 5 from Eastern Orthodox Church, 4 from Calvinist Church and 1 from Jehovah's Witnesses.
