= Žarnov =

Žarnov Zsarnó
- Municipality
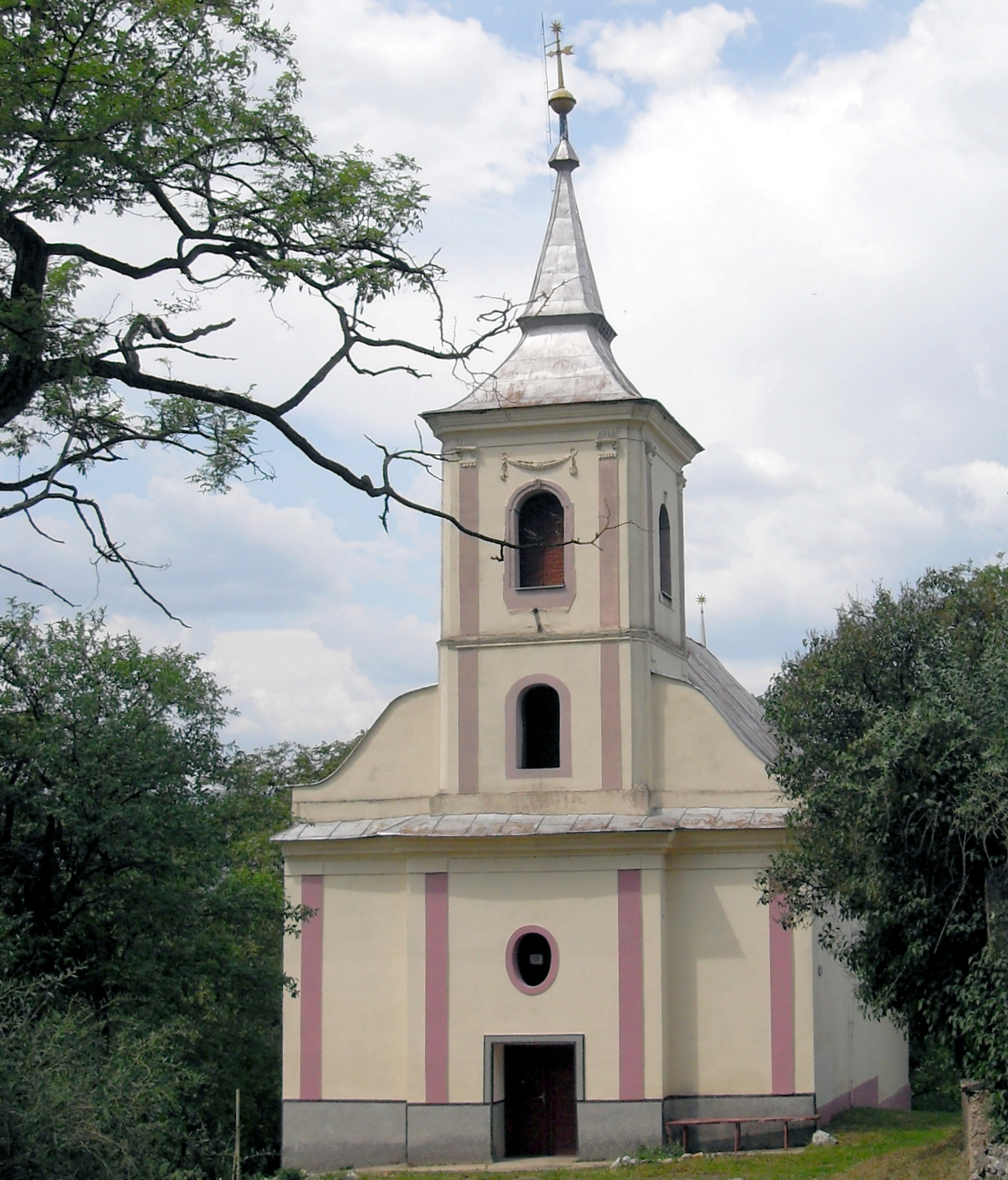

- Flag Coat of arms

- Location of Žarnov in the Košice Region Location of Žarnov in Slovakia
- Coordinates: 48.58°N 20.93°E
- Country: Slovakia
- Region: Košice Region
- District: Košice-okolie District
- First mentioned: 1332

Government
  - Mayor: Roland Szabó (Hlas-SD)

Area
  - Total: 7.19 km^{2} (2.78 sq mi)
- Elevation: 197 m (646 ft)

Population (2025)
  - Total: 462
- Time zone: UTC+1 (CET)
  - Summer (DST): UTC+2 (CEST)
- Postal code: 440 4
- Area code: +421 55
- Vehicle registration plate (until 2022): KS
- Website: www.zarnov.sk

Žarnov (Hungarian: Zsarnó) is a village and municipality in Košice-okolie District in the Kosice Region of eastern Slovakia.

== Geography ==
The municipality lies at an altitude of 197 metres (646 ft) and covers an area of 7.19 km^{2} (2.78 sq mi) (2025).

== History ==
In historical records the village was first mentioned in 1332.

== Population ==
Population statistic (10 years)
Year	1995	2005	2015	2025
Count	351	415	422	462
Difference		+18.23%	+1.68%	+9.47%

Population statistic
Year	2024	2025
Count	451	462
Difference		+2.43%

It has a population of 462 people (31 December 2025).

=== Ethnicity ===
Census 2021 (1+ %)
Ethnicity	Number	Fraction
Hungarian	261	60.27%
Slovak	177	40.87%
Not found out	48	11.08%
Total	433	

In year 2021 was 433 people by ethnicity 261 as Hungarian, 177 as Slovak, 48 as Not found out, 4 as Other, 2 as Romani and 1 as Ukrainian.

Note on population: The difference values of population numbers in the table "Population statistic" and in the sections "Ethnicity" & "Religion" is caused by the use of various statistical methods.

=== Religion ===
Census 2021 (1+ %)
Religion	Number	Fraction
Roman Catholic Church	241	55.66%
Calvinist Church	85	19.63%
None	37	8.55%
Not found out	36	8.31%
Greek Catholic Church	16	3.7%
Evangelical Church	9	2.08%
Total	433	

In year 2021 was 433 people by religion 241 from Roman Catholic Church, 85 from Calvinist Church, 37 from None, 36 from Not found out, 16 from Greek Catholic Church, 9 from Evangelical Church, 3 from Jehovah's Witnesses, 2 from Christian Congregations in Slovakia, 2 from Islam, 1 from Old Catholic Church and 1 from Other.

== Government ==
The municipal seat of the tax office and district office is located at Moldava nad Bodvou and the seat of the police force is at Turňa nad Bodvou.

== Transport ==
The nearest railway station is at Turňa nad Bodvou.
