= Rakaswadi =

Village in Maharashtra

- Village
- Location in Maharashtra, India Rakaswadi (India)
- Coordinates: 18.8534798°N 73.4715153°E
- Country: India
- State: Maharashtra
- District: Pune
- Tehsil: Mawal

Government
  - Type: Panchayati Raj
  - Body: Gram panchayat

Area
  - Total: 371 ha (920 acres)

Population (2011)
  - Total: 20
  - Density: 5.4/km^{2} (14/sq mi)
- Sex ratio 10 / 10 ♂/♀

Languages
  - Official: Marathi
  - Other spoken: Hindi
- Time zone: UTC+5:30 (IST)
- Pin code: 410405
- Telephone code: 02114
- ISO 3166 code: IN-MH
- Vehicle registration: MH-14
- Website: pune.nic.in

Rakaswadi is a village in India, situated in the Mawal taluka of Pune district in the state of Maharashtra. It encompasses an area of 371 ha (917 acres).

== Administration ==
The village is administrated by a sarpanch, an elected representative who leads a gram panchayat. At the time of the 2011 Census of India, the gram panchayat governed five villages and was based at Shirdhe.

== Demographics ==
At the 2011 census, the village comprised 2 households. The population of 20 was split between 10 males and 10 females.

== See also ==
- List of villages in Mawal taluka
