= Somavadi =

Village in Maharashtra

- Village
- Location in Maharashtra, India Somavadi (India)
- Coordinates: 18.8293148°N 73.4161865°E
- Country: India
- State: Maharashtra
- District: Pune
- Tehsil: Mawal

Government
  - Type: Panchayati Raj
  - Body: Gram panchayat

Area
  - Total: 317 ha (780 acres)

Population (2011)
  - Total: 200
  - Density: 63/km^{2} (160/sq mi)
- Sex ratio 105 / 95 ♂/♀

Languages
  - Official: Marathi
  - Other spoken: Hindi
- Time zone: UTC+5:30 (IST)
- Telephone code: 02114
- ISO 3166 code: IN-MH
- Vehicle registration: MH-14
- Website: pune.nic.in

Somavadi is a village in India, situated in the Mawal taluka of Pune district in the state of Maharashtra. It encompasses an area of 317 ha (783 acres).

== Administration ==
The village is administrated by a sarpanch, an elected representative who leads a gram panchayat. At the time of the 2011 Census of India, the gram panchayat governed five villages and was based at Shirdhe.

== Demographics ==
At the 2011 census, the village comprised 37 households. The population of 200 was split between 105 males and 95 females.

== See also ==
- List of villages in Mawal taluka
