= Medzev =

Medzev Metzenseifen
- Municipality
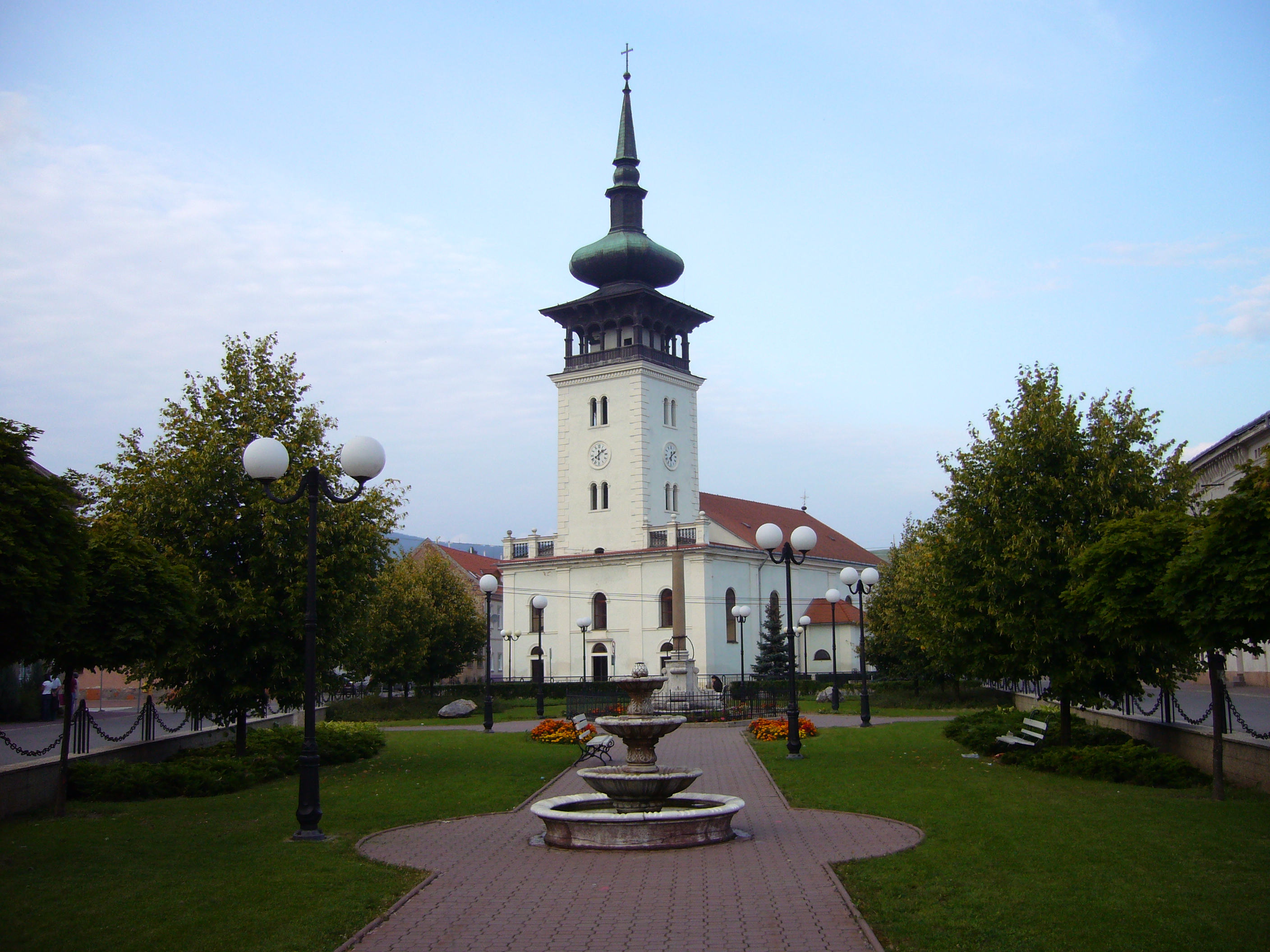

- Flag Coat of arms

- Location of Medzev in the Košice Region Location of Medzev in Slovakia
- Coordinates: 48.70°N 20.89°E
- Country: Slovakia
- Region: Košice Region
- District: Košice-okolie District
- First mentioned: 1359

Government
  - Mayor: Valeria Flachbartová

Area
  - Total: 64.29 km^{2} (24.82 sq mi)
- Elevation: 318 m (1,043 ft)

Population (2025)
  - Total: 4,181
- Time zone: UTC+1 (CET)
  - Summer (DST): UTC+2 (CEST)
- Postal code: 442 5
- Area code: +421 55
- Vehicle registration plate (until 2022): KS
- Website: www.medzev.sk

Medzev (Hungarian: Mecenzéf, German: Metzenseifen, also known as Metzenseifen to Americans) is a town and large municipality in Košice-okolie District in the Košice Region of eastern Slovakia. It is one of several towns in Bodva Valley. Other towns in Bodva Valley include: Jasov, Lucia Bania, Vyšný Medzev (Upper Metzenseifen), and Stos. Historically, It belonged to one of the original mountain towns in the Lower Zips/Dolný Spis: Gelnica/Göllnitz, Smolník/Schmöllnitz, Nálepkovo/Wagendrüssel, Krompachy/Krompach, Mníšek nad Hnilcom/Einsiedel, Švedlár/Schwedler.

== History ==
=== The first settlement ===
Any official documents regarding the founding of Metzenseifen have yet to be found and were likely destroyed in the Counter-Reformation. Much of the historical records obtained regarding the history of Medzev come from the monastery in Jasov. As shown in the timeline, the departure of the Mongols in 1241 prompted King Béla IV to rebuild Hungary as quickly as possible. It is known that he invited Germans as part of his recolonization effort. Whether he directly invited the particular settlers of Metzenseifen remains unknown, but possible. The first official document from the Bodva Valley is that of a legal document from 1272, which describes the litigation of forestry rights between Vyšný Medzev / Upper Metzenseifen and Jasov. It could be extrapolated that Metzenseifen was founded sometime between 1241 and 1272.

=== The Little Village "Das Dörfl" ===
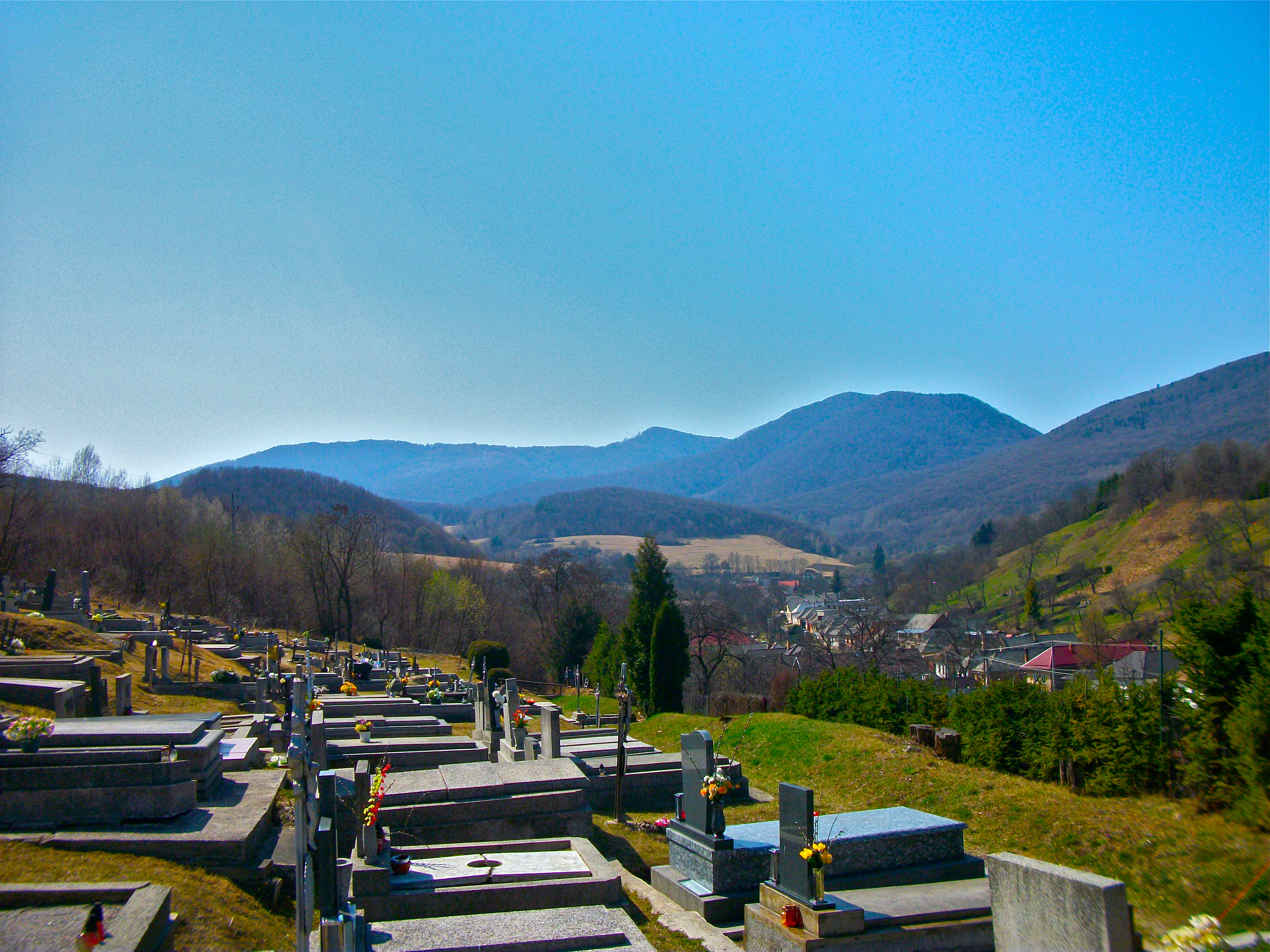
View of Grund from Old Cemetery

Until now, any documents that would have been submitted to Vienna or Budapest regarding Medzev's specific date of establishment have not been found. Therefore, we must draw information from reliable sources in the timeline like demarcation, into which the colonists would have entered upon arriving in the area called Metzenseifen. The timeline, as well as official documents and historical data were wiped out by the end of the Counter-Reformation. The monastery in Jasov and the neighboring townships could help us via documents, in which the name "Metzenseifen" was mentioned.

=== The original settlers ===
The town was founded by ethnic Germans during the High Middle Ages. It is safe to assume that they had a good reason to leave home in present-day Germany and form this new settlement. The Feudal Age of the thirteenth century was less than satisfactory. It is known that certain privileges (e.g. freedom from servitude, etc.) were promised in order to persuade people to come to Slovakia (part of Upper Hungary).

Unfortunately, it is not yet known exactly where the origins of the German settlers originated. It was not common to register migrants in the 13th century. However, comparative research in dialectology may one day identify the origins.

The Germans of Metzenseifen belong to the Zipser Germans or Zipsers (see Zipser German Party), the Zipsers being named so after the Zips Mountains, called Spiš in Slovak. The Zips are a smaller group of mountains that are included in the Carpathian mountain range, which is why they are also known as Karpatendeutsche(n) respectively Carpathian Germans in English (or Mantaken, alternatively, in German).

=== Timeline of earliest known events ===
This is a timeline of Medzev/Metzenseifen, founded between 1241 and 1272

== Summary ==
In historical records the town was first mentioned in 1359. It was founded and settled by ethnic Germans.

The modern town stems from the merging of Nižný Medzev (German: Untermetzenseifen/Nider Metzenseifen/Nider Metzenseiffen/Nieder Mäzenseuffen/Nieder Metzenseif/Unter Mäznsüffen/ Unnter Metzensyffen)(Hungarian: Alsómeczenzéf) and Vyšný Medzev (German: Obermetzenseifen/Ober Metzenseuf; again independent since 1999) in 1960. The earliest known record of the town Metzenseifen comes from 1359 Mechenseuph. There were most likely German and Slovak miners living together at that time, although Hungarian records show that the area was mostly uninhabited before King Bela IV invited Germans into the area. After the Mongolian invasion, there was a strong surge of German families. The ownership ratio between the two ethnic groups was assigned by the Jasov Monastery. Church and town records from as far back as the mid 1400s do not show any evidence of Slovak families in the town.

Mining in the mountain continued to increase throughout and after the 14th century, as well as handcraft. After the 15th century, Medzev/Meztenseifen split between /Nižný/Unter-/Lower and Vyšný/Ober/Upper Medzev/Metzenseifen. During the Reformation, the monastery was closed and its governance discontinued. The struggle for power continued throughout the Counter-Reformation and eventually resulted in the rebuilding of the monastery under the supervision of Maria Theresia, the Habsburg Archduchess of Austria and Queen of Hungary and Croatia.

Over the course of the industrialization period, Medzev/Metzenseifen became an economic center (site of many well-paid blacksmiths [approximately 100], who created agricultural tools). This led to tension in the 1930s between German and Slovak speakers in the workplace. Before 1920 when Hungary was partitioned due to pressure by the Czechs and Slovaks, after forcing Hungary to sign the Treaty of Trianon, German was the official language of the town, and ethnically 95% German. After 1920, some Slovaks moved into the town but the town was still predominately German. Until the end of World War II, the German population significantly outnumbered the Slovak population. After World War II, teaching German in the town was forbidden, some Germans were killed, others expelled, and those who remained have assimilated. Germans were looked down upon, their children were forcibly educated in Slovak and a town which has been German for over 700 years has now been mostly obliterated. Although "official" records state that over 20% of the population speaks German, it's closer to 10% and the "Mantak" dialect of German the Merzenseifers spoke is only spoken now by a few dozen people. In the past ten years, the number of Germans has increased by approximately 0.75%.

== Panorama of the Bodva Valley ==
This is a northward panorama of the Bodva Valley in Slovakia.

== Geography ==
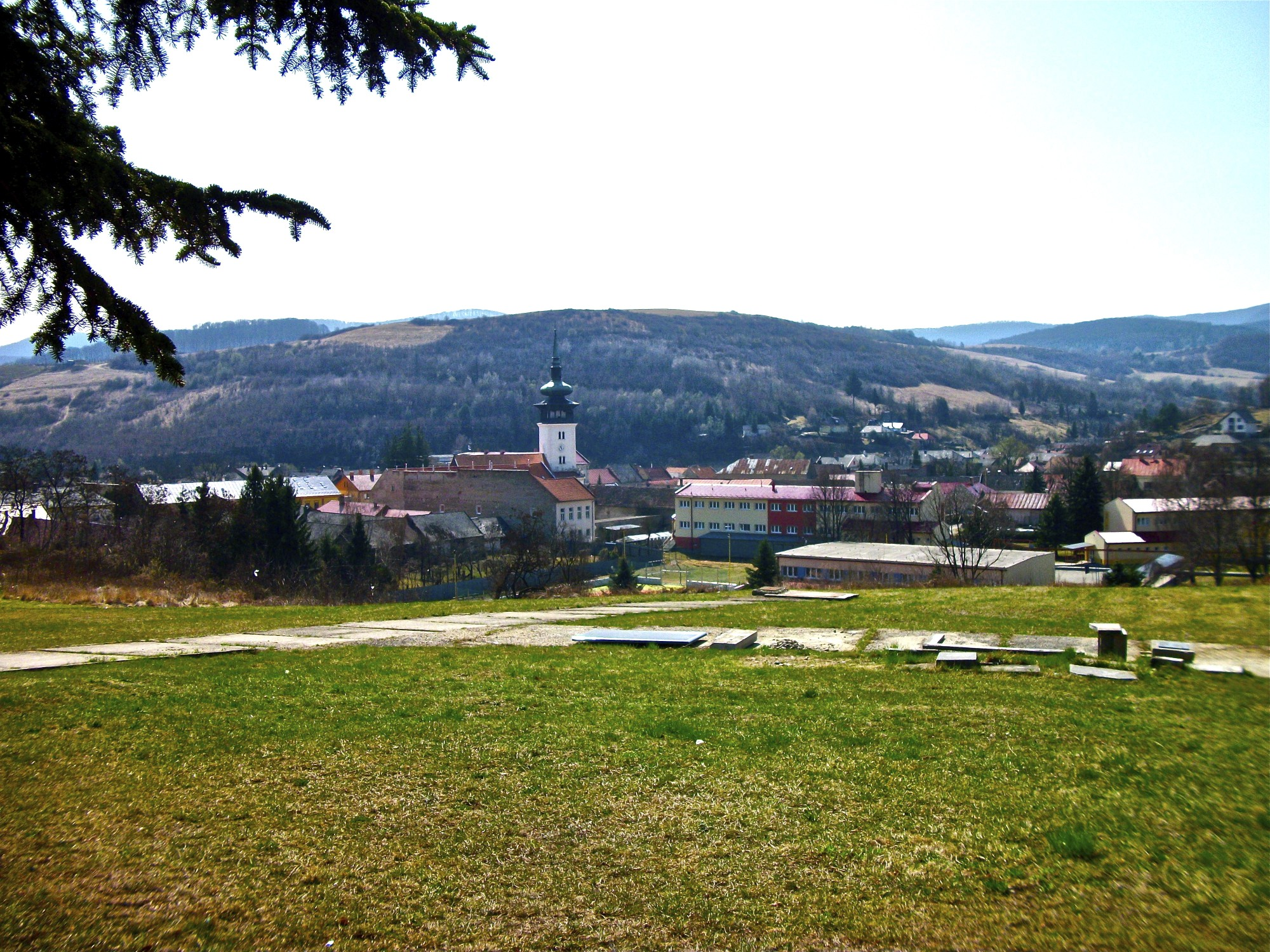
View of town looking south.

The municipality lies at an altitude of 318 metres (1,043 ft) and covers an area of 64.29 km^{2} (24.82 sq mi) (2025). It is located at the foothills of the Slovak Karst (south) and Volovec Mountains (north) on the Bodva River, around 35 km west of Košice.

== People ==
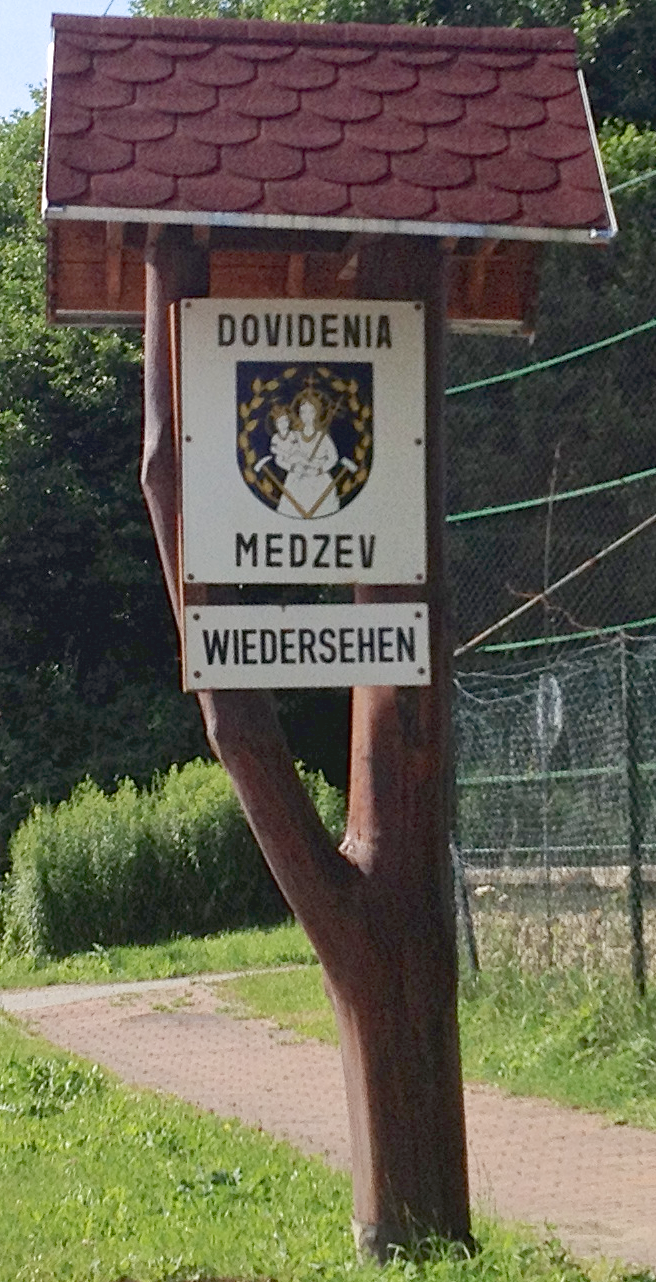
Departure sign "Dovidenia"/"Wiedersehen" when leaving Medzev/Metzenseifen towards Stos.

This village is primarily home to Slovaks, Germans, Hungarians, and Romani. Those people of Germanic origin refer to themselves as "Mantaks", although are more commonly recognized as Zipser Germans or Carpathian Germans.

=== Notable people ===
- Theodor Kundtz was born on July 1, 1852, in Lower Metzenseifen. He traveled to the United States and became a millionaire in Cleveland, Ohio by making wooden furniture.
- Rudolf Schuster was the second president of Slovakia and came from a Carpathian German family from Medzev.

== Population ==
Historical population
Year	Pop.	±%
1970	2,649	—
1980	3,026	+14.2%
1991	3,241	+7.1%
2001	3,667	+13.1%
2011	4,261	+16.2%
2021	4,107	−3.6%
Source: Censuses

Population statistic (10 years)
Year	1995	2005	2015	2025
Count	4025	3776	4382	4181
Difference		−6.18%	+16.04%	−4.58%

Population statistic
Year	2024	2025
Count	4166	4181
Difference		+0.36%

It has a population of 4181 people (31 December 2025).

=== Ethnicity ===
Census 2021 (1+%)
Ethnicity	Number	Fraction
Slovak	3506	85.36%
Romani	762	18.55%
German	415	10.1%
Not found out	340	8.27%
Hungarian	61	1.48%
Total	4107	

In year 2021 was 4107 people by ethnicity 3506 as Slovak, 762 as Romani, 415 as German, 340 as Not found out, 61 as Hungarian, 25 as Czech, 8 as Rusyn, 5 as Other, 4 as Vietnamese, 2 as Polish, 2 as Bulgarian, 1 as Ukrainian, 1 as English and 1 as Albanian.

Note on population: The difference values of population numbers in the table "Population statistic" and in the sections "Ethnicity" & "Religion" is caused by the use of various statistical methods.

=== Religion ===
Census 2021 (1+%)
Religion	Number	Fraction
Roman Catholic Church	2288	55.71%
None	1302	31.7%
Not found out	294	7.16%
Greek Catholic Church	78	1.9%
Evangelical Church	44	1.07%
Total	4107	

In year 2021 was 4107 people by religion 2288 from Roman Catholic Church, 1302 from None, 294 from Not found out, 78 from Greek Catholic Church, 44 from Evangelical Church, 25 from Calvinist Church, 23 from Christian Congregations in Slovakia, 11 from Jehovah's Witnesses, 9 from Apostolic Church, 8 from Other, 6 from Other and not ascertained christian church, 5 from Eastern Orthodox Church, 4 from Buddhism, 3 from Ad hoc movements, 2 from Islam, 2 from Seventh-day Adventist Church, 2 from Church of Jesus Christ of Latter-day Saints and 1 from Baptists Church.

== Twin towns – sister cities ==
Medzev is a member of the Charter of European Rural Communities, a town twinning association across the European Union, along with:

- Bienvenida, Spain
- Bièvre, Belgium
- Bucine, Italy
- (Republic of Ireland) Cashel, Ireland
- Cissé, France
- Desborough, England, United Kingdom
- Esch (Haaren), Netherlands
- Hepstedt, Germany
- Ibănești, Romania
- Kandava (Tukums), Latvia
- Kannus, Finland
- Kolindros, Greece
- Lassee, Austria
- Næstved, Denmark
- Nagycenk, Hungary
- Nadur, Malta
- Ockelbo, Sweden
- Pano Lefkara, Cyprus
- Põlva, Estonia
- Samuel (Soure), Portugal
- Starý Poddvorov, Czech Republic
- Strzyżów, Poland
- Svoge, Bulgaria
- Tisno, Croatia
- Troisvierges, Luxembourg
- Žagarė (Joniškis), Lithuania

Other twin towns

- Castel Giorgio, Italy
- Holice, Czech Republic
- Miroslav, Czech Republic
- Rátka, Hungary
