= Torna County =

County of the Kingdom of Hungary

Coordinates: 48°36′N 20°53′E

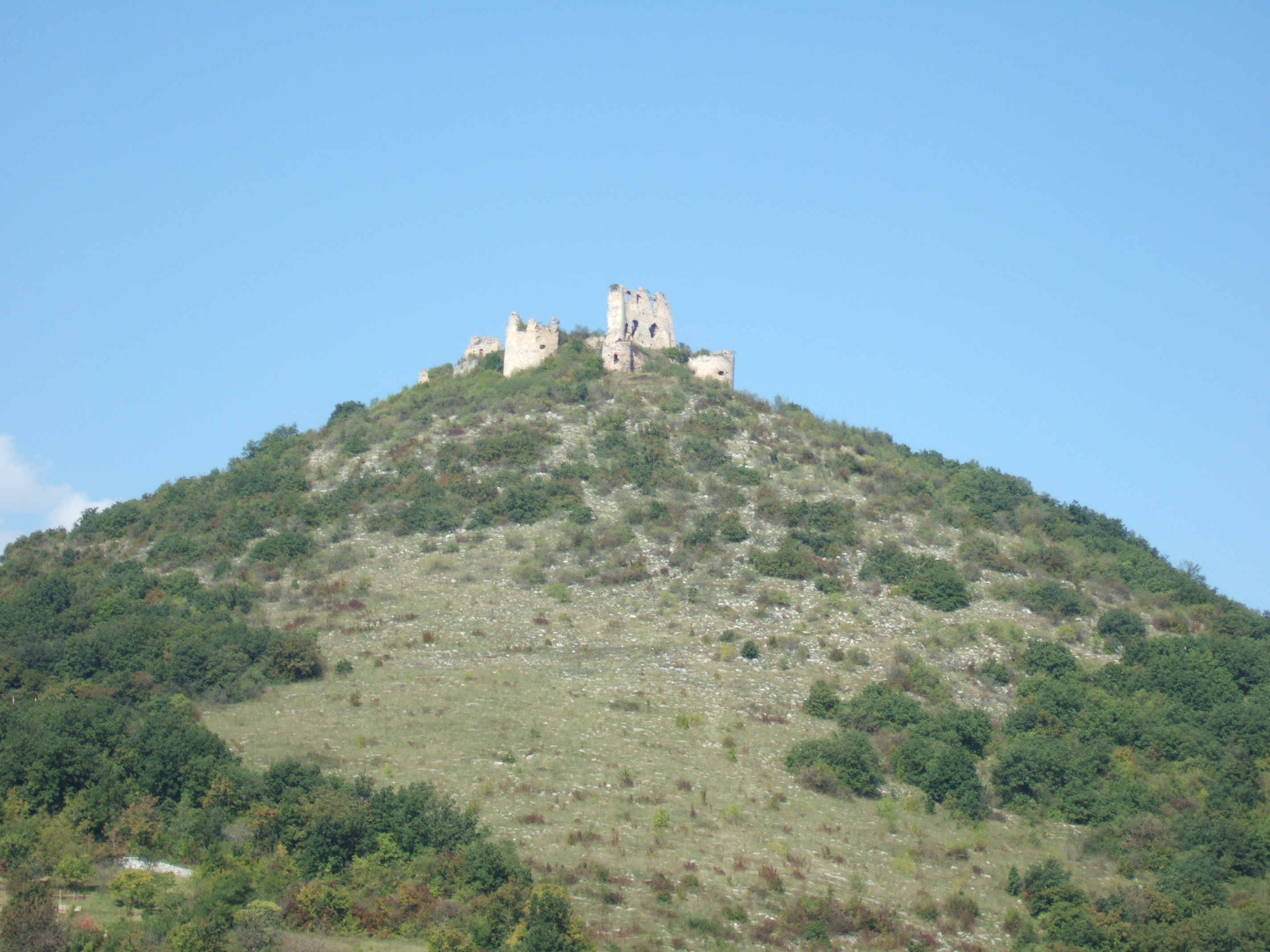
Turňa Castle

Torna (Slovak: Turňa, Latin and Hungarian: Torna, German: Tornau) is the name of a historic administrative county (comitatus) of the Kingdom of Hungary. It was located in present-day southeastern Slovakia and northern Hungary; today Turňa is only an informal designation of the corresponding territory in Slovakia. It was primarily a large estate consisting of royal forest lands.

The initially large county was one of the original counties in the Kingdom of Hungary, but was gradually reduced to a territory corresponding to a small territory around the Turňa River (Hungarian: Torna-patak). The capital of the county was Turňa Castle (Hungarian: Tornai vár), later the town of Turňa nad Bodvou (Hungarian: Torna).

From 1785 to 1790, 1848–1859, and ultimately in 1882 it was merged with the county Abov to form the county Abaúj-Torna (Abov-Turňa).
