= Shirdhe =

Village in Maharashtra

Shirdhe Shiradhe
- Village
- Location in Maharashtra, India Shirdhe (India)
- Coordinates: 18.8485027°N 73.4854752°E
- Country: India
- State: Maharashtra
- District: Pune
- Tehsil: Mawal

Government
  - Type: Panchayati Raj
  - Body: Gram panchayat

Area
  - Total: 565 ha (1,400 acres)

Population (2011)
  - Total: 394
  - Density: 69.7/km^{2} (181/sq mi)
- Sex ratio 203 / 191 ♂/♀

Languages
  - Official: Marathi
  - Other spoken: Hindi
- Time zone: UTC+5:30 (IST)
- Telephone code: 02114
- ISO 3166 code: IN-MH
- Vehicle registration: MH-14
- Website: pune.nic.in

Shirdhe is a village and gram panchayat in India, situated in the Mawal taluka of Pune district in the state of Maharashtra. It encompasses an area of 565 ha (1,396 acres).

== Administration ==
The village is administrated by a sarpanch, an elected representative who leads a gram panchayat. At the time of the 2011 Census of India, the village was the headquarters for the eponymous gram panchayat, which also governed the villages of Jambhavali, Rakaswadi, Somavadi and Thoran.

== Demographics ==
At the 2011 census, the village comprised 67 households. The population of 394 was split between 203 males and 191 females.

== See also ==
- List of villages in Mawal taluka
