= Turňa (river) =

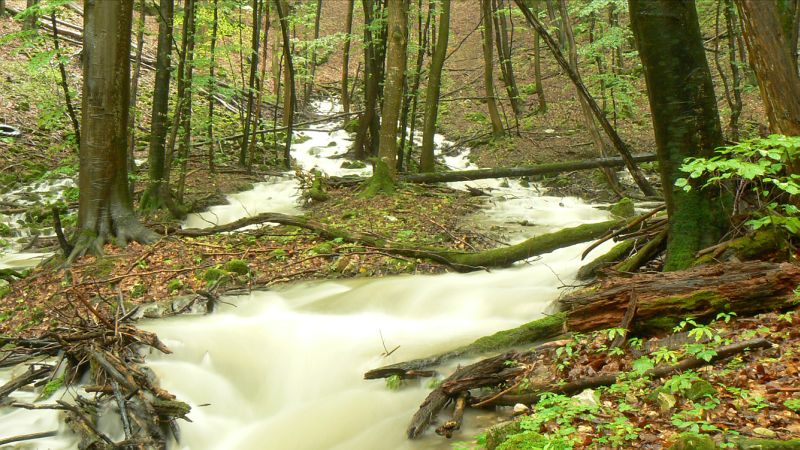

Location
- Country: Slovakia

Physical characteristics
- Mouth
  - location: Bodva
  - coordinates: 48.5798°N 20.8743°E
- Length: 25.0 km (15.5 mi)
- Basin size: 179 km^{2} (69 sq mi)

Basin features
- Progression: Bodva→ Sajó→ Tisza→ Danube→ Black Sea

The Turňa (Slovak: Turňa, Hungarian: Torna-patak; German: Tornau) is a right tributary of the Bodva river in Slovakia near the border with Hungary. It flows into the Bodva near Turňa nad Bodvou. It is 25.0 km (15.5 mi) long and its basin size is 179 km^{2} (69 sq mi).
