= Peder, Košice-okolie District =

Peder Péder
- Municipality
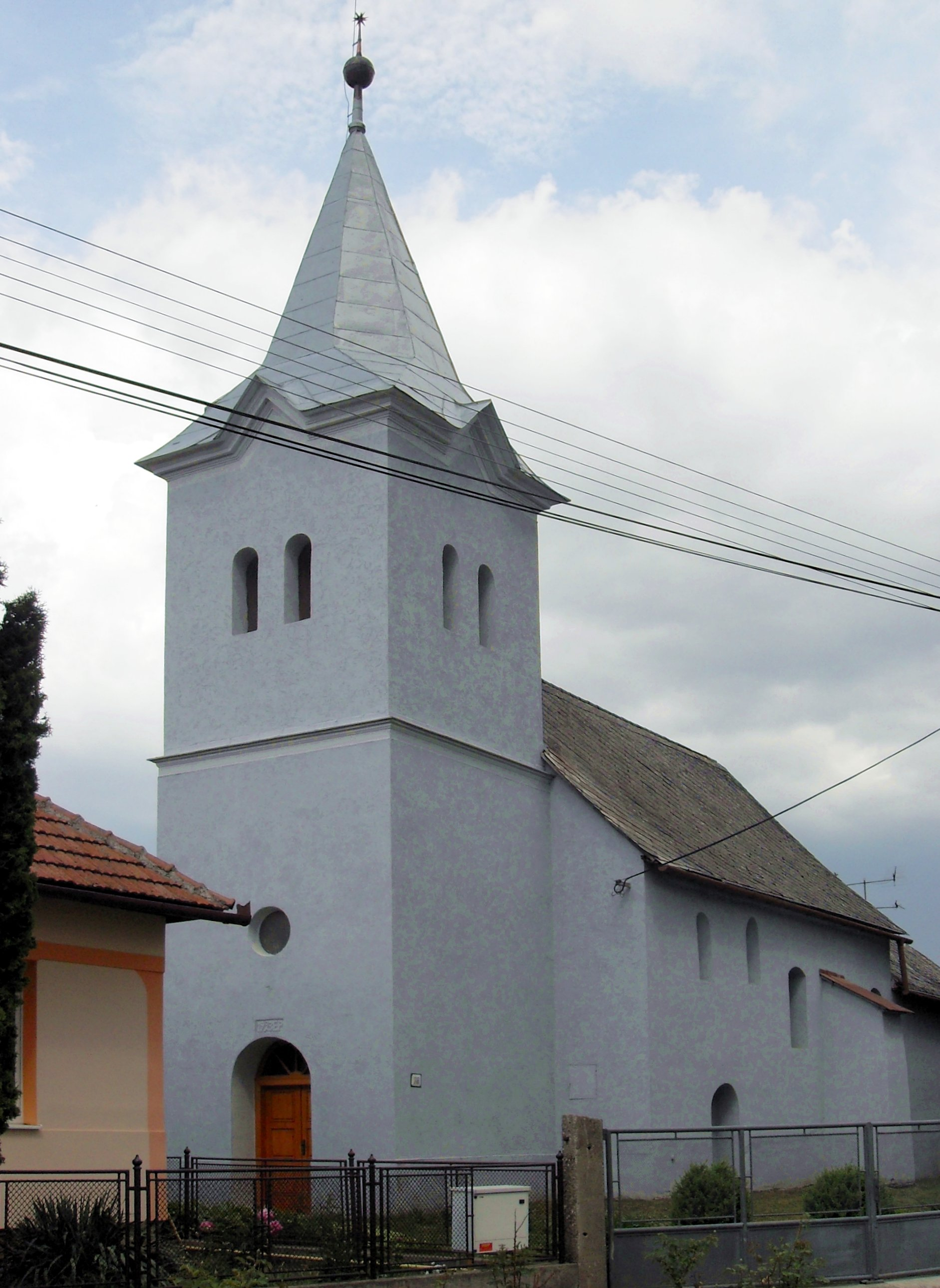

- Flag

- Location of Peder in the Košice Region Location of Peder in Slovakia
- Coordinates: 48.57°N 20.95°E
- Country: Slovakia
- Region: Košice Region
- District: Košice-okolie District
- First mentioned: 1275

Area
  - Total: 11.27 km^{2} (4.35 sq mi)
- Elevation: 181 m (594 ft)

Population (2025)
  - Total: 380
- Time zone: UTC+1 (CET)
  - Summer (DST): UTC+2 (CEST)
- Postal code: 440 5
- Area code: +421 55
- Vehicle registration plate (until 2022): KS
- Website: www.peder.sk

Peder (Hungarian: Péder) is a village and municipality in Košice-okolie District in the Kosice Region of eastern Slovakia.

== History ==
In historical records the village was first mentioned in 1275.

== Geography ==
The municipality lies at an altitude of 181 metres (594 ft) and covers an area of 11.27 km^{2} (4.35 sq mi) (2025).

== Population ==
Population statistic (10 years)
Year	1995	2005	2015	2025
Count	343	411	402	380
Difference		+19.82%	−2.18%	−5.47%

Population statistic
Year	2024	2025
Count	378	380
Difference		+0.52%

It has a population of 380 people (31 December 2025).

=== Ethnicity ===
Census 2021 (1+ %)
Ethnicity	Number	Fraction
Hungarian	272	69.92%
Slovak	128	32.9%
Romani	5	1.28%
Not found out	4	1.02%
Total	389	

In year 2021 was 389 people by ethnicity 272 as Hungarian, 128 as Slovak, 5 as Romani, 4 as Not found out, 2 as Czech, 2 as Italian and 1 as Rusyn.

Note on population: The difference values of population numbers in the table "Population statistic" and in the sections "Ethnicity" & "Religion" is caused by the use of various statistical methods.

=== Religion ===
Census 2021 (1+ %)
Religion	Number	Fraction
Roman Catholic Church	256	65.81%
Calvinist Church	73	18.77%
None	38	9.77%
Greek Catholic Church	8	2.06%
Evangelical Church	6	1.54%
Total	389	

In year 2021 was 389 people by religion 256 from Roman Catholic Church, 73 from Calvinist Church, 38 from None, 8 from Greek Catholic Church, 6 from Evangelical Church, 3 from Jehovah's Witnesses, 2 from Other and not ascertained christian church, 2 from Not found out and 1 from Ad hoc movements.
