= Zádiel =

Zádiel Szádelő
- Municipality
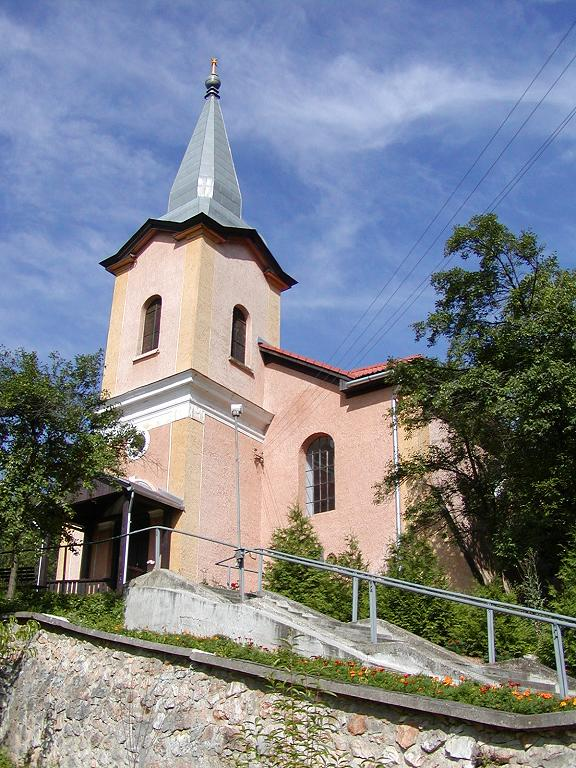
- Reformed church

- Location of Zádiel in the Košice Region Location of Zádiel in Slovakia
- Coordinates: 48.61°N 20.83°E
- Country: Slovakia
- Region: Košice Region
- District: Košice-okolie District
- First mentioned: 1317

Government
  - Mayor: Attila Nehoda

Area
  - Total: 3.51 km^{2} (1.36 sq mi)
- Elevation: 246 m (807 ft)

Population (2025)
  - Total: 154
- Time zone: UTC+1 (CET)
  - Summer (DST): UTC+2 (CEST)
- Postal code: 440 2
- Area code: +421 55
- Vehicle registration plate (until 2022): KS
- Website: obeczadiel.sk

Zádiel (Hungarian: Szádelő) is a village and municipality in Košice-okolie District in the Kosice Region of eastern Slovakia.

== History ==
In historical records, the village was first mentioned in 1317.

== Geography ==
The municipality lies at an altitude of 246 metres (807 ft) and covers an area of 3.51 km^{2} (1.36 sq mi) (2025).

== Population ==
Population statistic (10 years)
Year	1995	2005	2015	2025
Count	190	193	165	154
Difference		+1.57%	−14.50%	−6.66%

Population statistic
Year	2024	2025
Count	147	154
Difference		+4.76%

It has a population of 154 people (31 December 2025).

=== Ethnicity ===
Census 2021 (1+ %)
Ethnicity	Number	Fraction
Hungarian	135	87.09%
Slovak	31	20%
Not found out	3	1.93%
Total	155	

In year 2021 was 155 people by ethnicity 135 as Hungarian, 31 as Slovak and 3 as Not found out.

Note on population: The difference values of population numbers in the table "Population statistic" and in the sections "Ethnicity" & "Religion" is caused by the use of various statistical methods.

=== Religion ===
Census 2021 (1+ %)
Religion	Number	Fraction
Calvinist Church	103	66.45%
Roman Catholic Church	33	21.29%
None	11	7.1%
Evangelical Church	5	3.23%
Not found out	2	1.29%
Total	155	

In year 2021 was 155 people by religion 103 from Calvinist Church, 33 from Roman Catholic Church, 11 from None, 5 from Evangelical Church, 2 from Not found out and 1 from Greek Catholic Church.
