= Turna (clan) =

Turna is an Kamboj clan name found in the Punjab region of India and Pakistan as well as Turkey amongst the Turkishs. In Punjab, the Turnas are found as Sikhs, Hindus as well as the Muslims. Turna is a small village{{ in Punjab where many Turna people live and they use Turna as their last name.
