= Bodva =

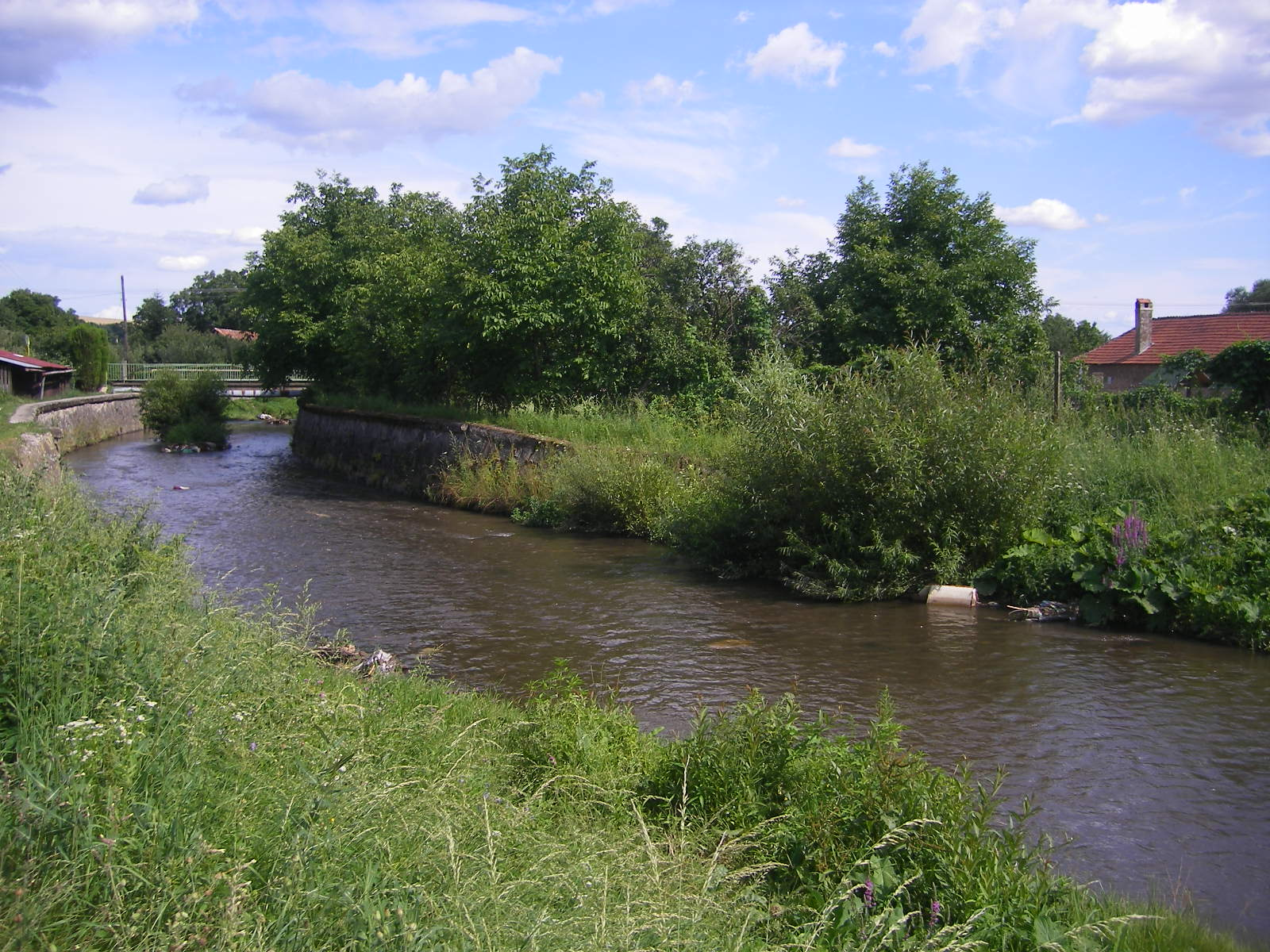
- Bodva in Jasov (Jászó)

Location
- Countries: Slovakia and Hungary

Physical characteristics
- Mouth
  - location: Sajó
  - coordinates: 48.2084°N 20.7746°E
- Length: 110 km (68 mi)
- Basin size: 1,727 km^{2} (667 sq mi)
- Discharge
  - average: 9 m^{3}/s (320 cu ft/s)

Basin features
- Progression: Sajó→ Tisza→ Danube→ Black Sea

The Bodva (Hungarian: Bódva, Slovak: Bodva, German: Bodwa) is a 110-km long river in Slovakia and Hungary. Its source is in the Slovak Ore Mountains. The river crosses the border with Hungary near Turňa nad Bodvou, and flows into the river Sajó in Boldva, north of Miskolc. Within Slovakia, its length is 47 km (29 mi) and its basin size is 866 km^{2} (334 sq mi). Two of its tributaries are the Turňa and the Ida.

The Bodva flows on the eastern edge of a karstic rock system, therefore it has an unsymmetrical drainage pattern. Up to Medzev, where the river reaches the karst region, and on its left side the Bodva river has a typical treelike river system.
