= Torana (art) =

Decorative door hanging

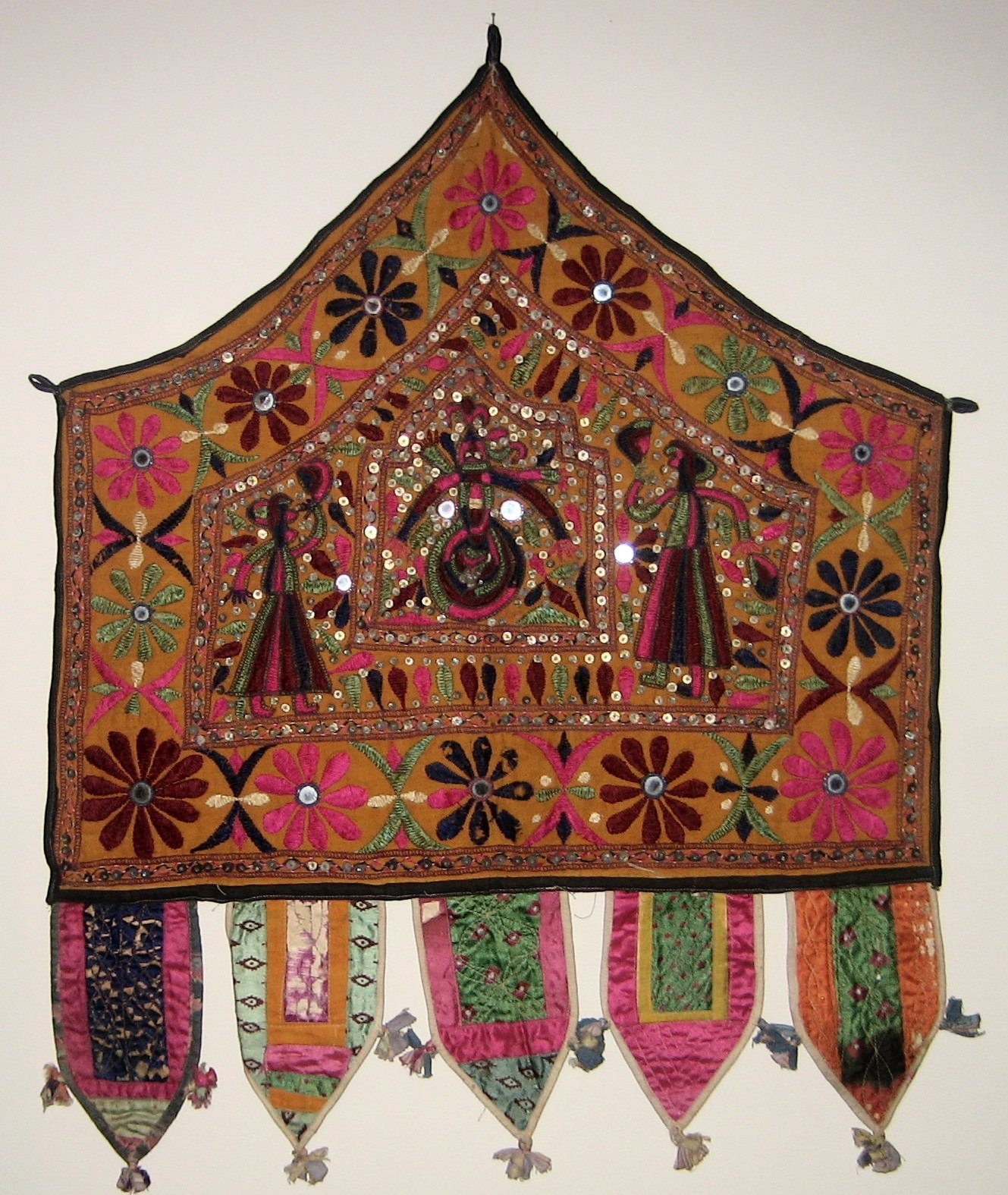
Toran from Gujarat, 20th Century, plain cotton weave with embroidery and mirror work, Honolulu Museum of Art. The hanging pieces are stylized mango leaves.

A toran is an auspicious decorative hanging or archway used during Hindu religious, social, and festive celebrations. Traditionally, it refers to a decoration made by tying mango leaves and garlands of flowers across the main entrance door of a structure or pandal. The origin of torans can be traced to Puranas (Indian epics) and is found in Mahabharata in which Torana means an arch, arched doorway, portal, festooned decorations over doorways with boughs of trees, garlands. It is considered a symbol of good fortune. Over time, the concept evolved into architectural arches built on structures like thrones, chariots, and entrance gates, primarily serving an aesthetic purpose. Torans can be found in various shapes, including circular, semi-circular, triangular, and bow-shaped. It is also referred to as a Bandanwal.

== In media ==
=== Sanskrit literature ===
References to torans are widespread across classical Sanskrit literature. In the text Meghaduta by the poet Kalidasa, a beautiful toran compared to a rainbow is mentioned. In this work, a character describes the toran as a prominent landmark to help a cloud identify his residence.

=== Treatises and epics ===
The technique, dimensions, and specifications for constructing torans are detailed in the ancient architectural treatise Manasara. This text categorizes torans into four distinct classes based on their decorative elements: Patra toran (leaf toran), Pushpa toran (flower toran), Ratna toran (gem or jewel toran) and Chitra toran (picture or painting toran). These names are derived from the specific figures carved upon them, which may include depictions of foliage, blossoms, precious gems, deities, yakshas, kinnaras, fish, snakes, and lions. Another variant known as the jaletoran features intricate lattice or network carvings set within an arch supported by two pillars. This type of decorative archway is explicitly mentioned in the Ramayana.

== Architecture ==
=== Buddhist Architecture ===
In historical Buddhist architecture, torans are built into the protective railings (vedikas) surrounding the stupas at Sanchi and Bharhut. These gateways are adorned with detailed carvings depicting historical occurrences, narratives from the Jataka tales, and significant events from the life of the Buddha. While these structures extensively feature symbols associated with the Buddha—such as his footprints, a throne, the Bodhi Tree, and the Dharmachakra—no physical idols or statues of the Buddha are depicted on them.

=== Jain Architecture ===
In Jain iconography, the term toran also denotes the decorative triangular arch positioned above the idols of Tirthankaras. This architectural feature is supported by a pair of pillars, exhibits detailed ornamental carvings, and is invariably topped with a kalasha (pinnacle).

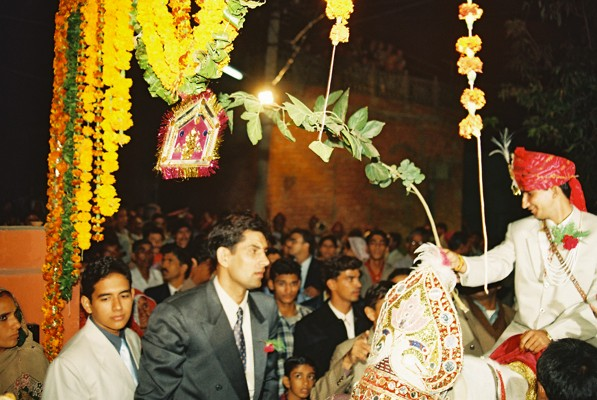
Jat marriage system includes a Toran marana ceremony: a symbol of victory put on the door of bride on arrival of baraat procession, groom comes and touches it with his sword or a neem or Zhaadi [berry] stick.

== Modern usage ==
In contemporary times, the tradition of hanging torans remains prevalent in households during festivals and celebratory events. Alongside traditional organic materials, modern iterations include hand-knitted or woven designs, as well as mass-produced variants made of plastic.

It is now associated with Hinduism and is usually decorated with marigolds and mango leaves, or a string that is tied on the door with the flower on it as a part of traditional Hindu culture on the occasion of festivals and weddings. A toran may feature colours such as green, yellow and red. They can be made of fabrics or metals which are usually made to resemble mango leaves. Peepal tree leaves are also used to make torans at some places in India. They also have other decorative features depending on the region.

== See also ==
- Thoranam, hanging decorations in Tamil Nadu
- Torana, in Hindu-Buddhist Indian-origin also found in Southeast Asia and East Asia
