= Toranam =

South Indian festoon

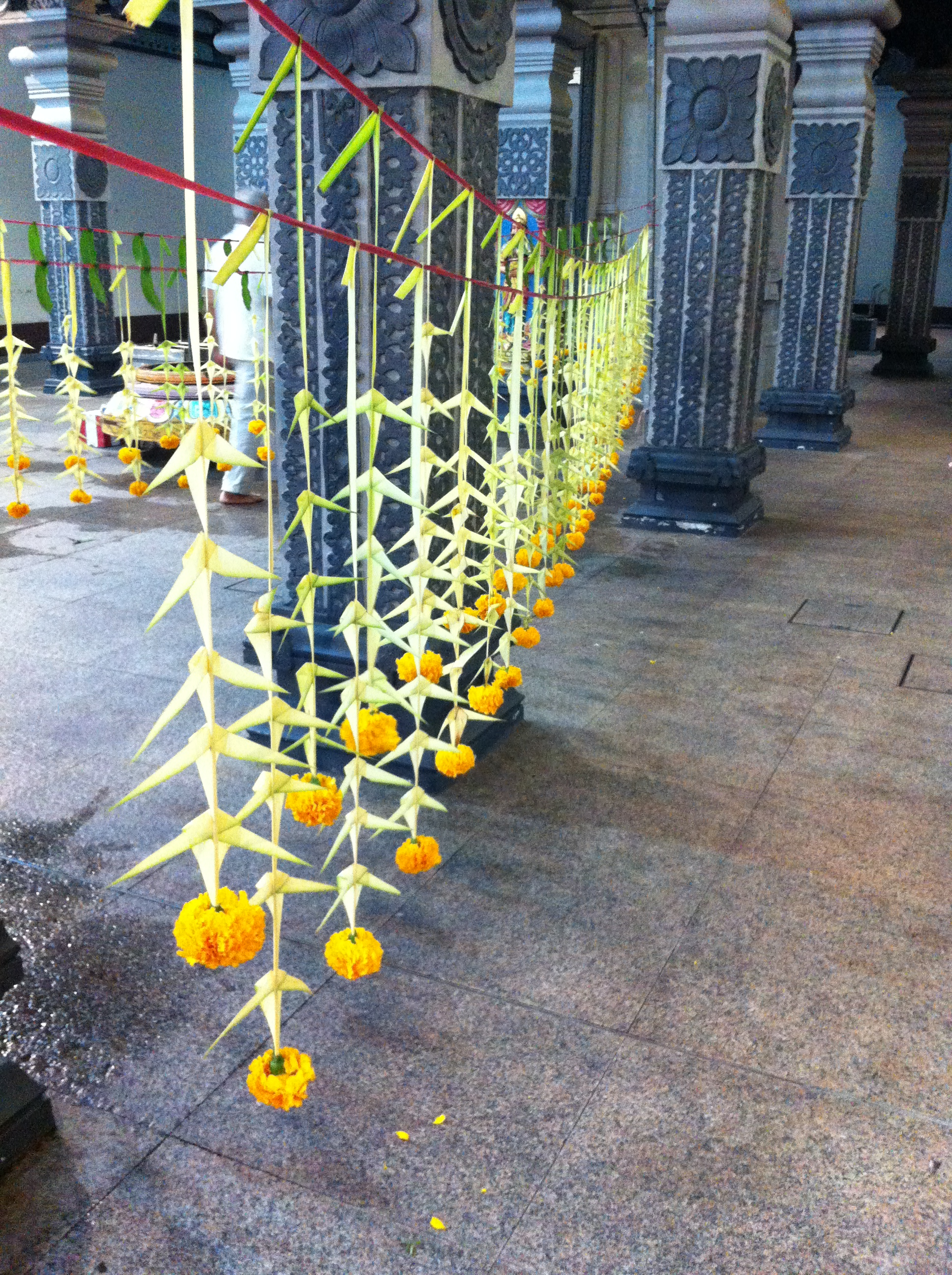
Toranams decoration in a Hindu Temple

Toranams (Tamil: தோரணம் IAST Tōraṇam) are hanging decorations in Tamil Nadu. These decorations are rooted in Tamil culture. The history of this decoration extends back to the Sangam period. In those days there were no printed invitations, so the decorations served to indicate to people visiting that place whether it is a happy occasion or mourning. Toranams is made up of tender coconut leaf blades and is made in two different types.

Toranams is mentioned in a song sung by 8th century Andal pasuram, Nachiyar Tirumoli of the Divya Prabandham in Tamil literature:

வாரணம் ஆயிரம் சூழ வலம் செய்து
நாரண நம்பி நடக்கின்றான் என்றெதிர்
பூரண பொற்குடம் வைத்துப் புறமெங்கும்
தோரணம் நாட்டக் கனாக்கண்டேன் தோழீ நான்

Meaning : I had a dream oh friend! The town was decked with festoons and golden urns. Surrounded by a thousand caparisoned elephants, our Kannan came towards me (to marry me).

She explains to Krishna about the dream she had.

== Types ==
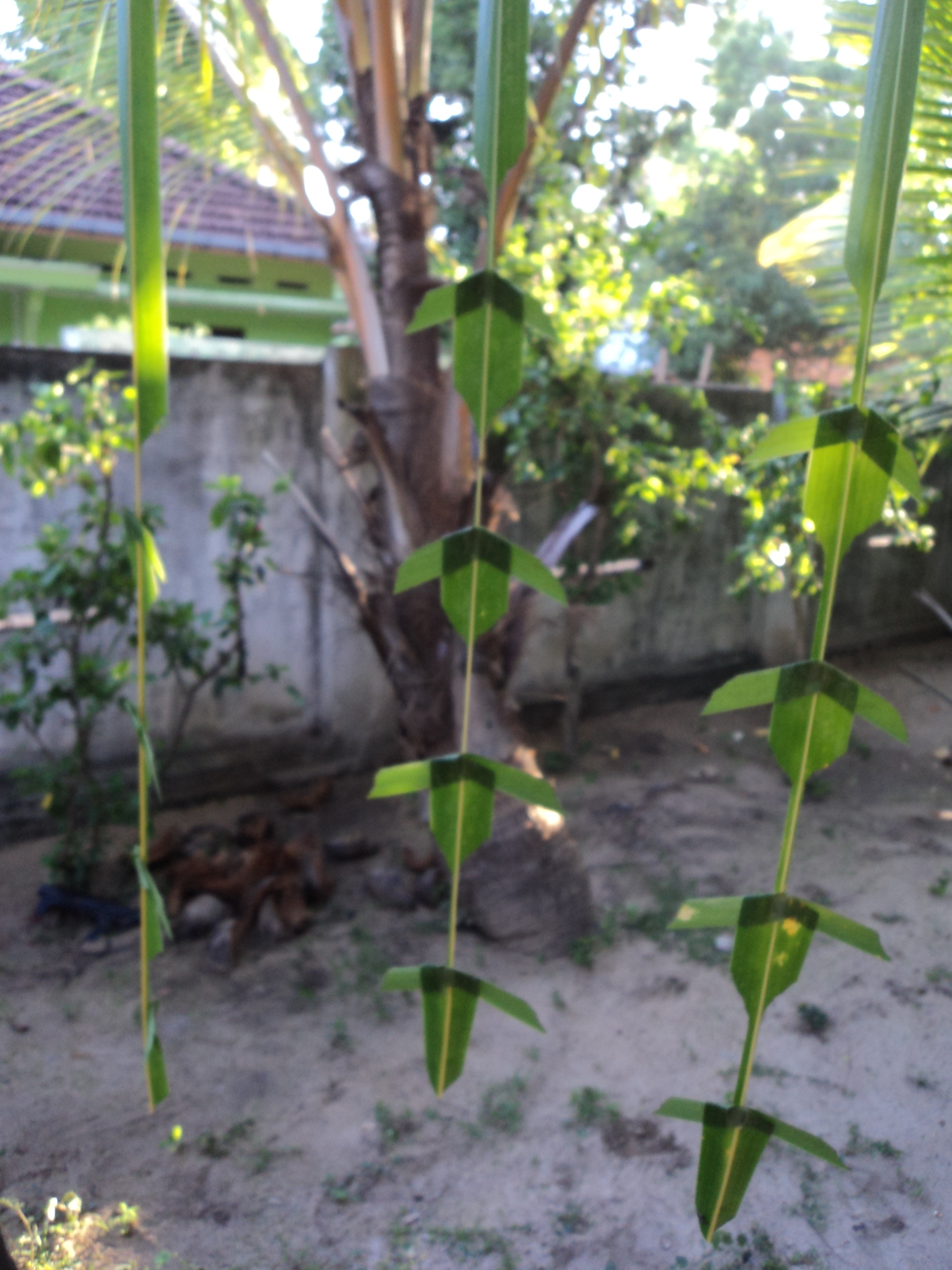
Mangala Toranams (auspicious)

- Mangala Toranams - Auspicious ones are used during festival seasons and happy occasions in homes and temples. Toranams has a bird like design and got four or five them which faces upward direction.

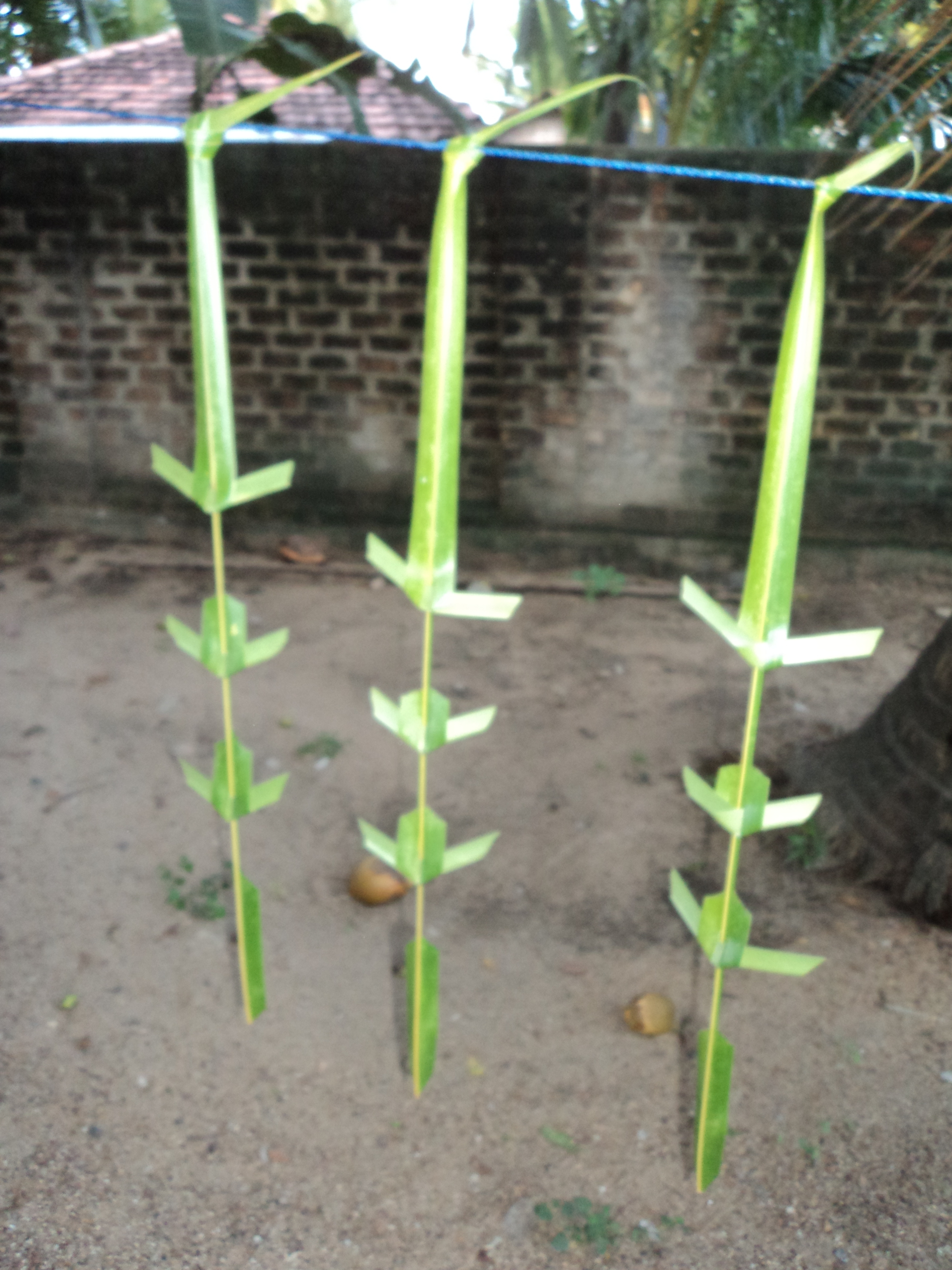
Amangala Toranams (Inauspicious)

- Amangala Toranams - Inauspicious ones are used in mourning places. They feature three birds which face downwards.

Another thoranam is Maavilai Toranams made up of mango tree leaves which are tied up on the main door of a temple or house for auspicious occasions. Mango leaves are considered to be a good disinfectant and they purify the air, which helps when there is a gathering of people for festivals are other positive occasions.

Veppilai thoranam is made up of Neem leaves. The words veepam (neem) + ilai(leaf) equal the word veppilai. Neem is considered to be a very good disinfectant for various diseases such as smallpox and mysterious fevers, especially during the summer season. In Tamil Nadu the Amman festivals were celebrated during summer and neem leaves are very prominently hung in temples, houses, and streets.

== See also ==
- Toran (art), Hindu hanging decorations
- Torana, Hindu and Buddhist doorway decoration
