= Turňa Castle =

Coordinates: 48°36′40″N 20°52′28″E

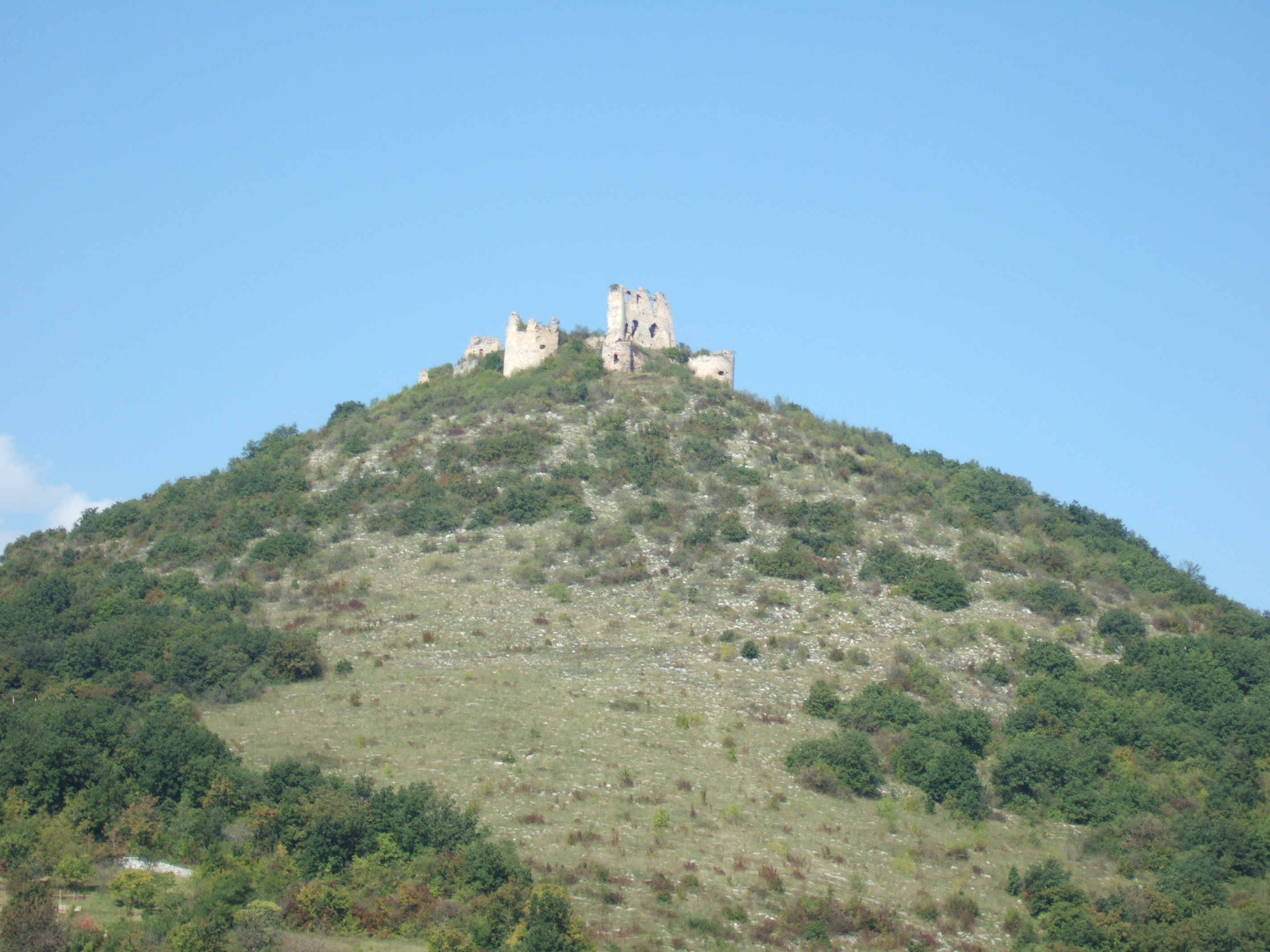
Turňa Castle

Turňa Castle (Hungarian: Tornai vár, Slovak: Turniansky hrad, German: Burg Tornau) is a castle in Turňa nad Bodvou, Košice Region, Slovakia.
