= Turňa nad Bodvou =

Turňa nad Bodvou Torna
- Municipality
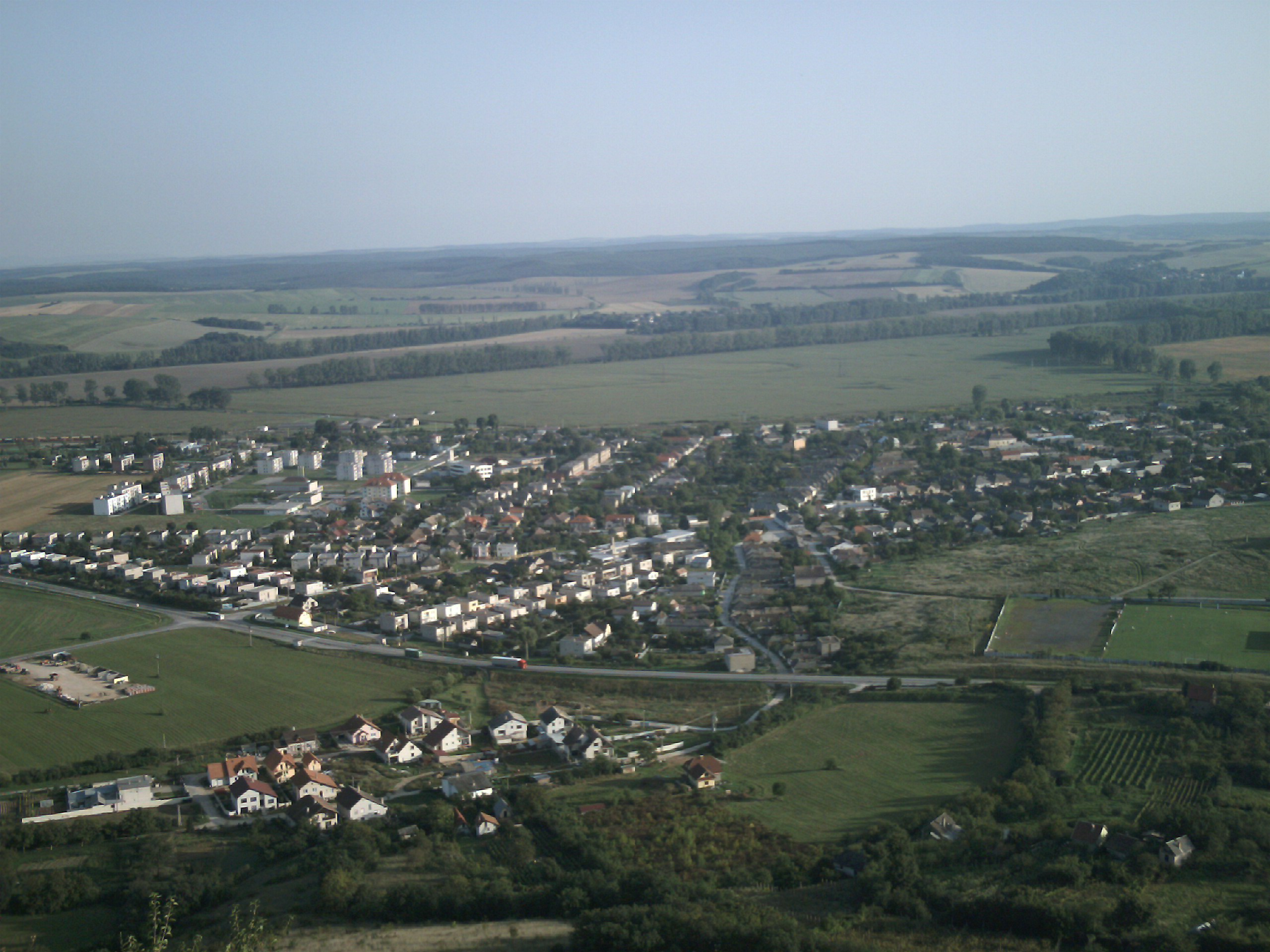

- Flag

- Location of Turňa nad Bodvou in the Košice Region Location of Turňa nad Bodvou in Slovakia
- Coordinates: 48.60°N 20.89°E
- Country: Slovakia
- Region: Košice Region
- District: Košice-okolie District
- First mentioned: 1221

Government
  - Mayor: Pavol Molnár

Area
  - Total: 23.21 km^{2} (8.96 sq mi)
- Elevation: 182 m (597 ft)

Population (2025)
  - Total: 3,707
- Time zone: UTC+1 (CET)
  - Summer (DST): UTC+2 (CEST)
- Postal code: 440 2
- Area code: +421 55
- Vehicle registration plate (until 2022): KS
- Website: www.turnanadbodvou.sk

Turňa nad Bodvou (Hungarian: Torna; German: Tornau; Yiddish טארנא) is a village and municipality in Košice-okolie District in the Košice Region of eastern Slovakia.

== History ==
In historical records the village was first mentioned in 1198. The capital of the historic county Torna County of the House of Keglević was Turňa Castle (Slovak: Turniansky hrad), later the town of Turňa nad Bodvou with a population of about 30'000 people in the year 1851. The town Turňa nad Bodvou became a village after the First World War and the Treaty of Trianon.

== Geography ==
The municipality lies at an altitude of 182 metres (597 ft) and covers an area of 23.21 km^{2} (8.96 sq mi) (2025).

== Population ==
Population statistic (10 years)
Year	1995	2005	2015	2025
Count	2901	3359	3557	3707
Difference		+15.78%	+5.89%	+4.21%

Population statistic
Year	2024	2025
Count	3686	3707
Difference		+0.56%

It has a population of 3707 people (31 December 2025).

=== Ethnicity ===
Census 2021 (1+ %)
Ethnicity	Number	Fraction
Slovak	1881	50.83%
Hungarian	1362	36.81%
Not found out	581	15.7%
Romani	171	4.62%
Total	3700	

In year 2021 was 3700 people by ethnicity 1881 as Slovak, 1362 as Hungarian, 581 as Not found out, 171 as Romani, 21 as Rusyn, 11 as Czech, 3 as Russian, 3 as German, 2 as Polish, 2 as Other, 2 as Bulgarian, 2 as English, 1 as Jewish, 1 as Moravian and 1 as Albanian.

Note on population: The difference values of population numbers in the table "Population statistic" and in the sections "Ethnicity" & "Religion" is caused by the use of various statistical methods.

=== Religion ===
Census 2021 (1+ %)
Religion	Number	Fraction
Roman Catholic Church	2403	64.95%
Not found out	587	15.86%
None	371	10.03%
Calvinist Church	117	3.16%
Greek Catholic Church	105	2.84%
Total	3700	

In year 2021 was 3700 people by religion 2403 from Roman Catholic Church, 587 from Not found out, 371 from None, 117 from Calvinist Church, 105 from Greek Catholic Church, 36 from Evangelical Church, 28 from Christian Congregations in Slovakia, 18 from Apostolic Church, 7 from Eastern Orthodox Church, 7 from Other, 6 from Other and not ascertained christian church, 4 from Jehovah's Witnesses, 3 from Old Catholic Church, 3 from United Methodist Church, 3 from Ad hoc movements, 1 from Jewish community and 1 from Buddhism.

== Government ==
The village has its own tax office and police force but the district office is located at Moldava nad Bodvou. It also has its own birth registering office.

== Economy and facilities ==
The village also has developed medical facilities including a Pharmacy and outpatient facilities for children and adolescents and a gynaecologist.

== Culture ==
The village has a public library and a DVD rental store. The village is connected to cable television. The village also has a castle located on a hill by the village entrance named the Turnansky Hrad. There is little remaining of the structure as much of it was destroyed under the orders of Ceasar Leopold in the year 1685, and later in 1848, a fire brought down the roof. There is now only one wall and the remains of a turret left standing although this too is crumbling.

== Sport ==
The village has a football pitch.

== Transport ==
The village has a railway station on the Košice to Zvolen line with a generally two-hourly service. It also has two bus stops.

== Gallery ==
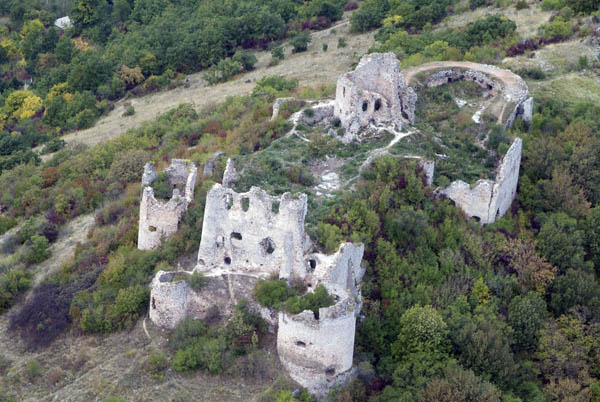
Aerial photography of Turňa Castle

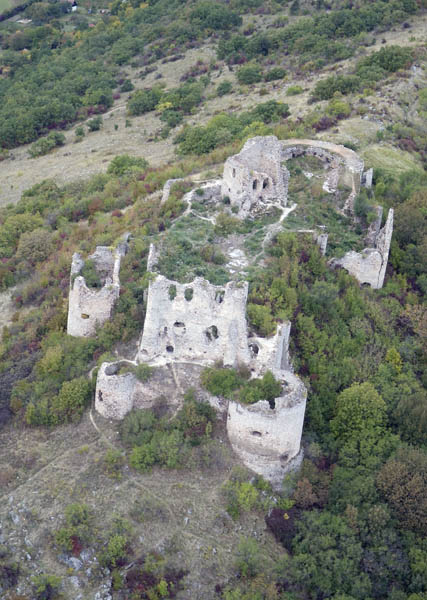

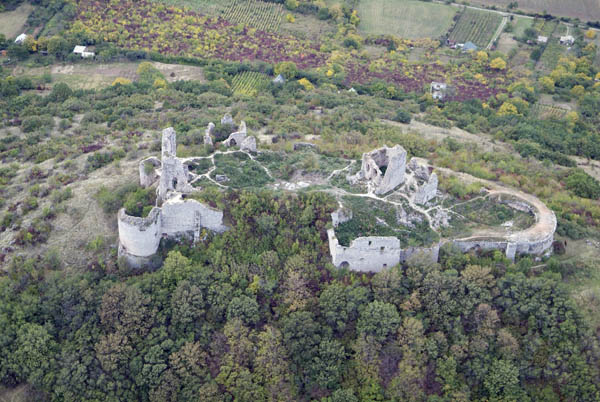
