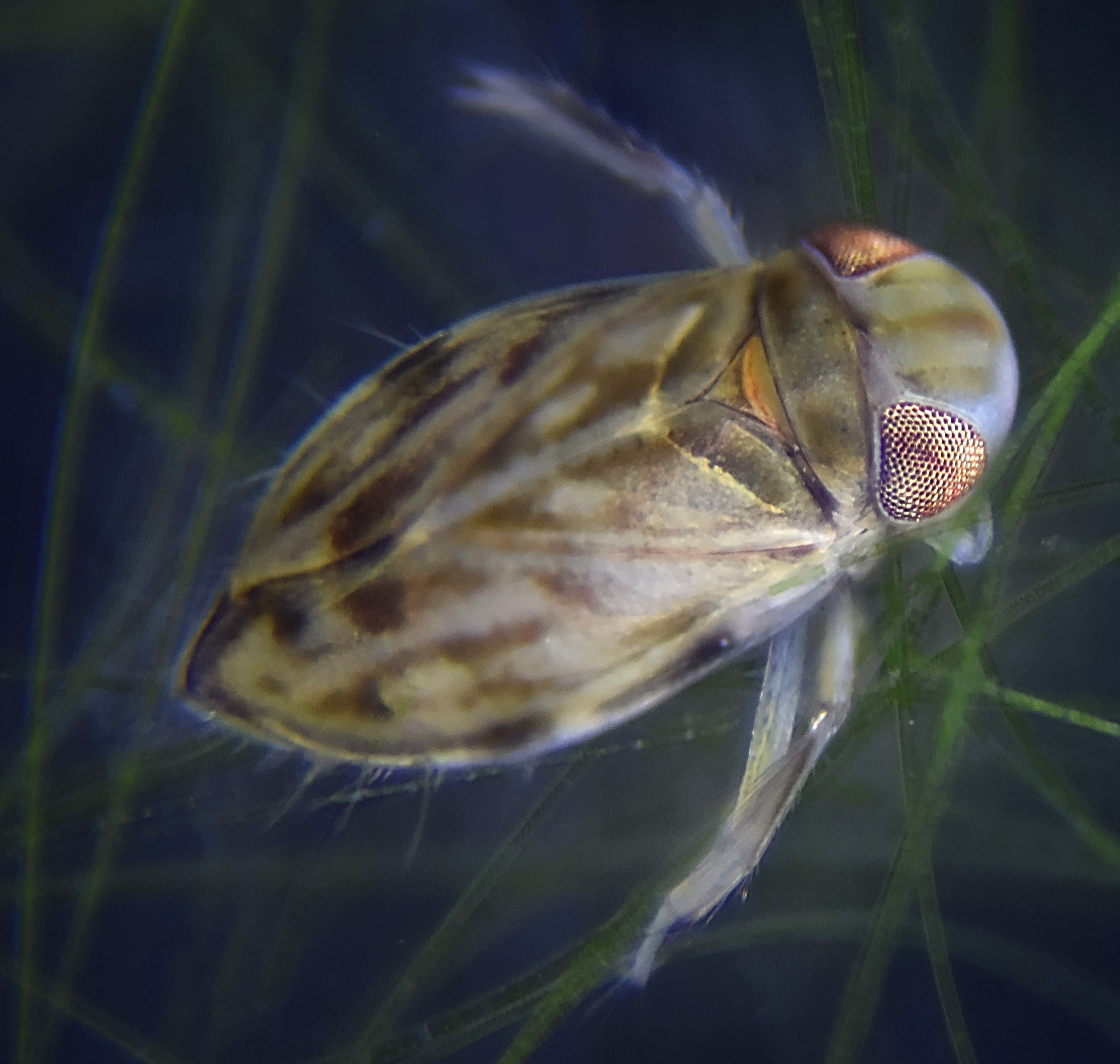
- Top view

Scientific classification
- Kingdom: Animalia
- Phylum: Arthropoda
- Class: Insecta
- Order: Hemiptera
- Suborder: Heteroptera
- Family: Micronectidae
- Genus: Micronecta
- Species: M. scholtzi

Binomial name
- Micronecta scholtzi (Fieber, 1860)

= Micronecta scholtzi =

Species of true bug

Micronecta scholtzi, the lesser water boatman, is a species of pygmy water boatman in the family Micronectidae. It was first described by Franz Xaver Fieber in 1860. They are some 2 mm long and are common in freshwater ponds and lakes across Europe, preferring stagnant to moderately moving water. In Central Europe, the genus Micronecta is represented by five species, as follows:

- Micronecta (Dichaetonecta) pusilla (Géza Horváth, 1895)
- Micronecta (Dichaetonecta) scholtzi (Fieber, 1860)
- Micronecta (Micronecta) griseola Géza Horváth, 1899
- Micronecta (Micronecta) minutissima (Linnaeus, 1758)
- Micronecta (Micronecta) poweri (Douglas & Scott, 1869)

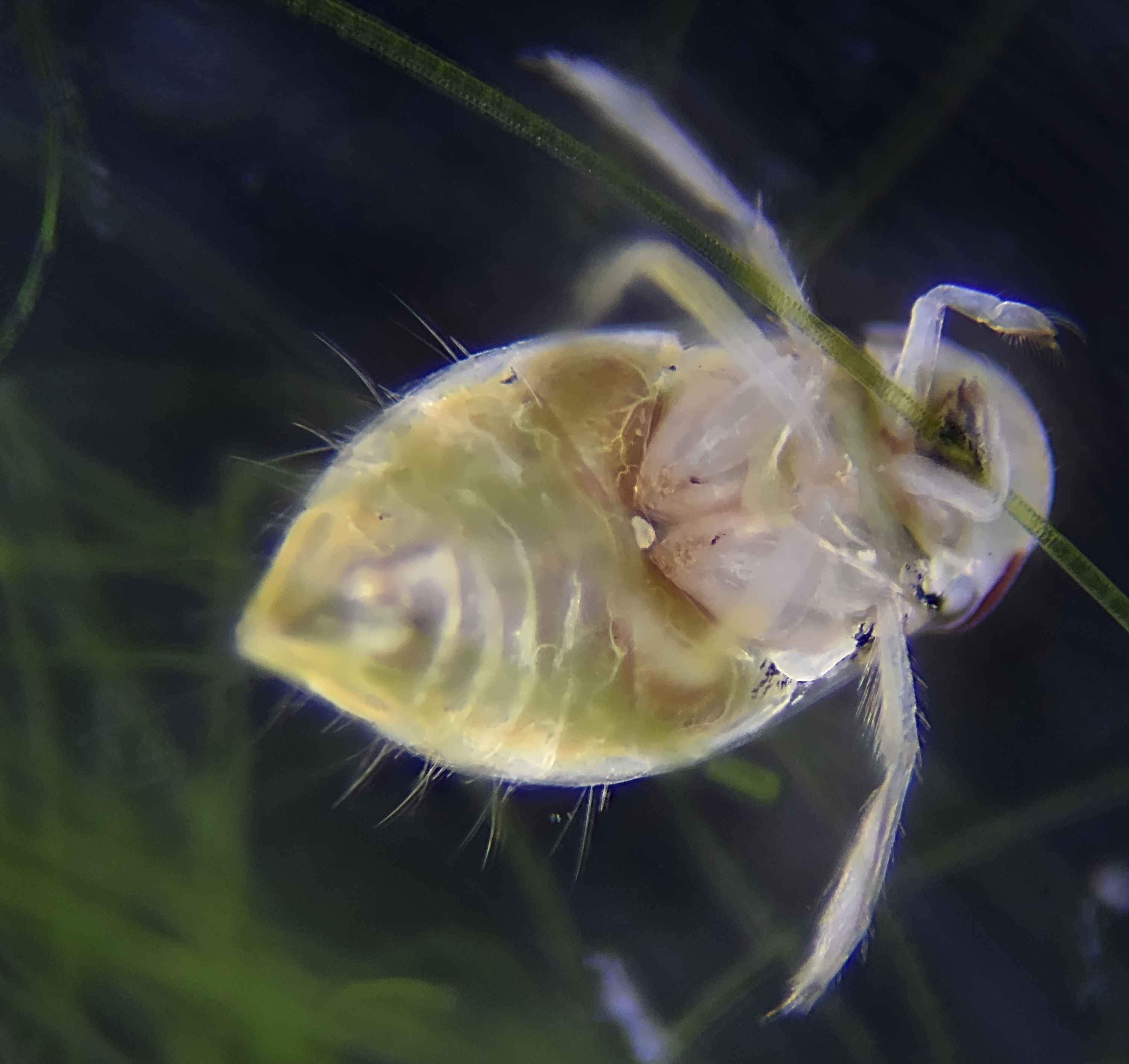
M. scholtzi bottom view

M. scholtzi is easily differentiated from other species in this genus by the twisted left paramere of the male genitalia, (see traumatic insemination) the short pronotum and a distinctive dark pattern on the head. Little is known of its habits and habitat, but it is thought to flourish in the shallows of ponds or lake shores.

The male of this species produces its underwater courtship song by stridulating a ridge on its penis across corrugations on its abdomen. The area involved measures only 50 micrometres across, or about the thickness of a human hair. A team of biologists and sound engineers from France and Scotland have recorded M. scholtzi producing sound up to 99.2 decibels, a volume comparable to a passing freight train. The noise was so unexpectedly loud that the engineers checked the calibration of their instruments. It is classified by Guinness World Records as the loudest penis. Almost all volume is lost when sound moves from water to air, but even so remains audible to humans walking along the pond shore. This species is considered the loudest of all animals for its size. Despite knowing the mechanism of its sound production, researchers are still mystified by the volume produced and feel that once the process is understood, it could open up a useful avenue in ultrasonics.

Not many insects are known to generate sound with reproductive organs, but there is another, the pyralid moth, Syntonarcha iriastis, which emits ultrasonic squeaks.
