= Micronecta poweri =

Scientific classification
- Domain: Eukaryota
- Kingdom: Animalia
- Phylum: Arthropoda
- Class: Insecta
- Order: Hemiptera
- Suborder: Heteroptera
- Family: Micronectidae
- Genus: Micronecta
- Species: M. poweri

Binomial name
- Micronecta poweri (Douglas & Scott, 1869)

Species of true bug

Micronecta poweri is a species of pygmy water boatmen in the family Micronectidae.
