= Helotrephinae =

- Heterotrephes admorsus

Scientific classification
- Kingdom: Animalia
- Phylum: Arthropoda
- Clade: Pancrustacea
- Class: Insecta
- Order: Hemiptera
- Suborder: Heteroptera
- Family: Helotrephidae
- Subfamily: Helotrephinae; Esaki & China, 1927

Tribes
- Helotrephini (Esaki & China, 1927); Limnotrephini (J. Polhemus, 1990)

Subfamily of insects

Helotrephinae is a subfamily of aquatic bugs that belongs to the family Helotrephidae (hemispherical backswimmers). Members of this subfamily can be found in the Oriental Realm of Malaysia and Borneo and Southern Africa.

== Taxonomy ==
The subfamily was described in 1927 by Japanese entomologist Teiso Esaki and English entomologist William Edward China with the type genus being Helotrephes.

The subfamily contains two tribes, they are listed below:

- Helotrephini Esaki & China, 1927
- Limnotrephini J. Polhemus, 1990
