= Micronecta griseola =

Scientific classification
- Domain: Eukaryota
- Kingdom: Animalia
- Phylum: Arthropoda
- Class: Insecta
- Order: Hemiptera
- Suborder: Heteroptera
- Family: Micronectidae
- Genus: Micronecta
- Species: M. griseola

Binomial name
- Micronecta griseola Horváth, 1899

Species of true bug

Micronecta griseola is a species of pygmy water boatmen in the family Micronectidae.
