= Pécs Organ Manufactory =

Pécs Organ Manufactory Ltd. (POM) was found in September, 1992. At the moment POM is the biggest organ building company in Hungary. The manufactory employs around 50 specialist who cover all fields of organbuilding. The webshop of the company was launched in 2009 which through they sell hundreds of organ parts.

== Company history ==
Pécs Organ Manufactory Ltd. was founded by Attila Budavári and his younger brother Csaba Budavári. Their interest and passion on organbuilding is a family heritage as some of their ancestors (e.g.: their great-grandfather) had worked at Angster organbuilding factory in Pécs, Hungary. Attila Budavári was only 12 years old when he decided to become an organbuilder as an adult. Therefore, after their organbuilding studies and study tours the two brothers found their own organbuilding company in Pécs, Hungary.

After foundation, first their projects were mainly clearings, restorations and renewals. Their first project was the clearing of Komló Roman Catholic Church which was followed by a very special project, the reconstruction of the 2000 years old Aquincum Water Organ, for the Fire Museum in Budapest, Hungary.

The first new organ was finished in 1995 for the Franciscan Secondary School's chapel in Szentendre. The instrument which is a tracker action organ was designed by Tamás Zászkaliczky and disposition was created by Attila Budavári. The organ has 16 stops, with 1041 metal pipes and 149 wood pipes.

After the success of the first organ the company started to receive more and more orders from Hungary and also other parts of the world. The second and third new organ was built in Sittendorf, Austria between 1997 and 1998.

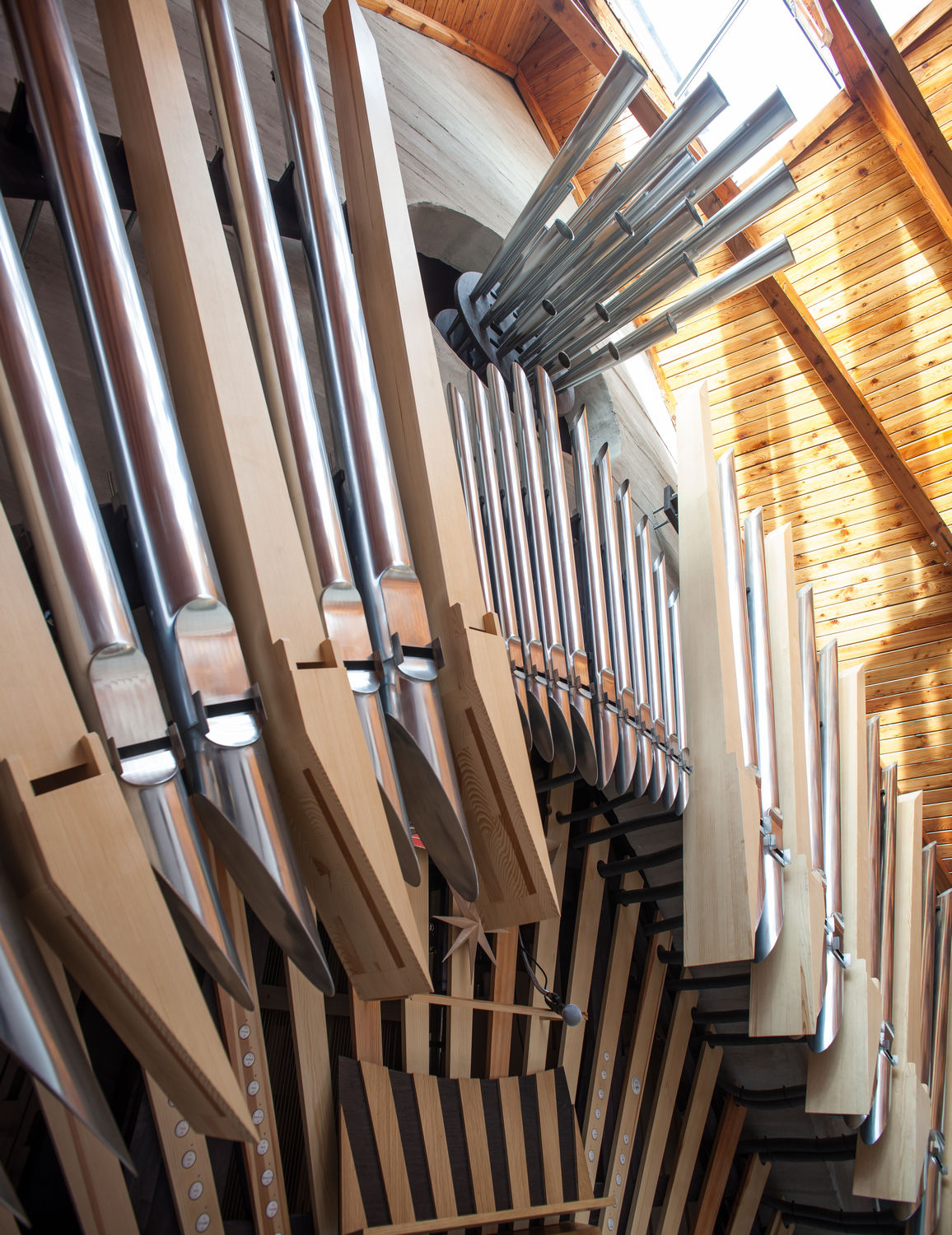

The real breakthrough for the Manufactory arrived when they got the opportunity to work on a project together the German Mühleisen Orgebau (Stuttgart). It was the building of the organ of Palace of Arts. The new monumental instrument has 6804 pipes, 92 stops and 5 manuals. The inauguration ceremony was held in May, 2006. Since then many famous organists, including Hungarians came to try the new organ and give a concert at the Palace of Arts in Budapest, Hungary.

The next important project was the clearing of the grand organ of Matthias Church in Buda Castle, Budapest, Hungary. They also built a smaller organ for the church near the main organ in 2010. It was a real innovation as the grand organ was connected to the small one and both could be played together and also separately.

In 2010 the Manufactory had another successful project: the organ built for Zamárdi Church was finished. It is a French baroque styled instrument, and it is considered to be is unique in Hungary. The project was made in cooperation with Bertrand Cattiaux's French organ workshop. János Pálúr, organist of Reformed Church of Fasor, Budapest said about the organ: “… this is a real professional premier […] the organ of Zamárdi opens a new era in the Hungarian organ culture, church music, high education and concert life”.

The next important new organ built by the firm was the Roman Catholic Church in Rešica. This organ is the first with modern design among their organs. This instrument won the Masterpiece of Hungarian Craft Award in 2015.

The next organ with special design was built in 2013 for the church of Aveiro, in Portugal. This piece is the second biggest organ in Portugal.

In line of the new organs a local instrument was the next. In 2014 the manufactory built the new organ of Protestant Church of Pécs-Kertváros, Hungary.

In 2016 the manufactory made a new organ in a really special place, to the Mátraverebély-Szentkút National Shrine Franciscan church, Hungary.

The latest new organ was finished this year, in June. The baroque organ which was built following the style of late works of G. Silbermann was built in Lutheran Church of Budavár, Budapest, Hungary.

== Awards ==
- Award of vocational training, Chamber of Commerce and Industry, Pécs-Baranya, 27. February, 2017.
- The small- and medium size company of the month Hungary, January, 2017, Ministry of Human Capacities.
- Pro Civitate Award, 2015 for Attila Budavári.
- Craftsman of the Year, Hungary, 2015 Chamber of Commerce and Industry, Pécs-Baranya.
- Hungarian Craft Award, 2015, for the organ of Roman Catholic Church of Reste.
- Ambassador Award, 2013 for Attila Budavári.

== Organs ==
- SOKÓŁ Małopolska Cultural Center, Nowy Sacz, Poland, III/68, 2017. Modernization, expansion.
- Lutheran Church of Buda Castle, Budapest, III/26, 2017. Baroque style new organ.
- Mátraverebély-Szentkút National Shrine, II/27, 2016. New organ.
- Zaláta Calvinistic Church, I/8, 2016. Restoration.
- Fasor Calvinistic Church, organ reconstruction (2015, Budapest Hungary)
- Calvinistic Church Kálvin Sq. Budapest, new historic mechanic organ (2015, Budapest Hungary)
- Matthias Church large organ's reconstruction (2015, Budapest Hungary)
- Calvinistic Parish Church Mezőberény, organ restoration (2014 Mezőberény, Hungary)
- Calvinistic Parish of Pécs-Kertváros, new organ (2013 Pécs, Hungary) – First organ in Hungary with dual usage slider
- Fábrica da Igreja Paroquial da Freguesia de Sra da Gloria Aveiro, new organ (2013, Portugal)
- Calvinistic Secondary School of Szentendre, new organ (2013 Budapest, Hungary)
- Roman Catholic Church of Rešica, new organ (2012, Slovakia)
- Košice Borrome St. Charles Seminary Church, organ adaptation and expansion (2011, Slovakia)
- Zamárdi, new French baroque organ (2010 Zamárdi, Hungary)
- Cathedral of Pécs (2009 Pécs, Hungary)
- Nagyvárad-Szöllős Roman Catholic Church, new organ (2008, Transylvania)
- Palace of Arts, new organ (2006, Budapest, Hungary) – Largest organ in Hungary
- Sittendorf, parish community room (1997, Sittendors, Austria)
- Saint Theresa Cathedral, Szabadka (1996, Szabadka, Serbia)
