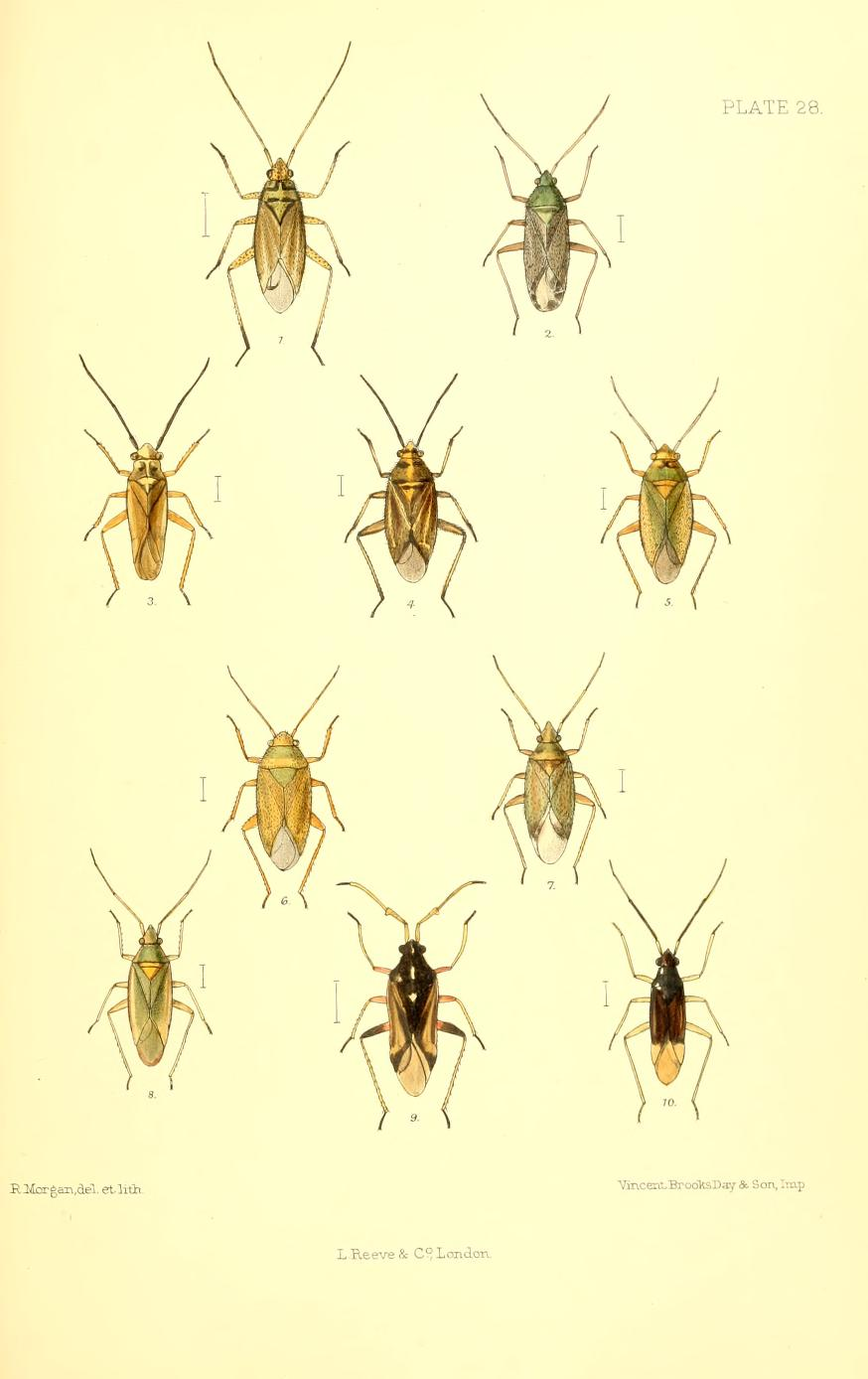
- Conostethus griseus depicted in Edward Saunders' Hemiptera Heteroptera of the British Islands, figure 3

Scientific classification
- Kingdom: Animalia
- Phylum: Arthropoda
- Clade: Pancrustacea
- Class: Insecta
- Order: Hemiptera
- Suborder: Heteroptera
- Family: Miridae
- Genus: Conostethus
- Species: C. griseus

Binomial name
- Conostethus griseus (Douglas & Scott, 1870)

= Conostethus griseus =

Species of true bug

Conostethus griseus is a Palearctic species of true bug.
