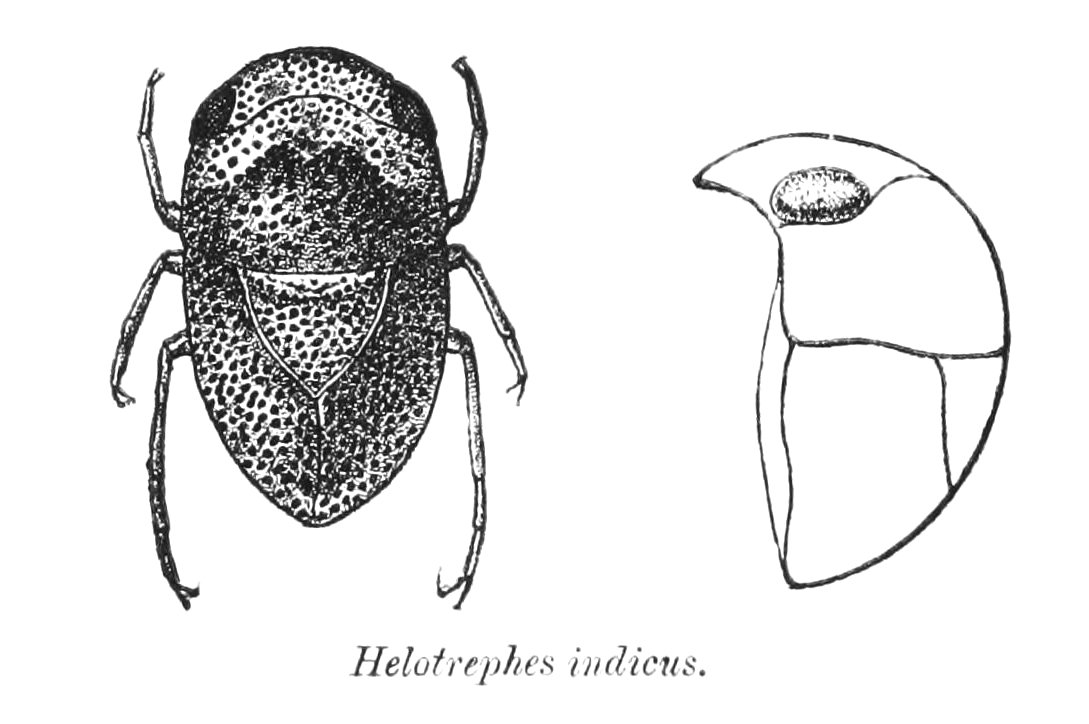
- Habitus and profile of Tiphotrephes indicus (Distant, 1910)
- Heterotrephes admorsus

Scientific classification
- Kingdom: Animalia
- Phylum: Arthropoda
- Clade: Pancrustacea
- Class: Insecta
- Order: Hemiptera
- Suborder: Heteroptera
- Clade: Tripartita
- Superfamily: Notonectoidea
- Family: Helotrephidae; Esaki & China, 1927

Subfamilies
- 5 (see text)

= Helotrephidae =

Family of true bugs

Helotrephidae, also known as hemispherical backswimmers, is a family of aquatic bugs that belongs to the order Hemiptera.

Members of this family are mainly found in the tropical regions. In the Oriental Realm, they can be found in Vietnam, Malaysia, Borneo, Singapore and the Philippines. They can also be found on Africa in Madagascar and South Africa and South America. They can be found swimming or walking amid submerged vegetation in stagnant or slow moving, shaded freshwater in forest habitats.

== Taxonomy ==
Helotrephidae are true bugs of the superfamily Notonectoidea. They are a sister group of the Pleidae. The family was described in 1927 by Japanese entomologist Teiso Esaki and English entomologist William Edward China with the type genus being Helotrephes.

The family contains several subfamilies, they are listed below;

- Fischerotrephinae
- Helotrephinae
- Neotrephinae
- Trephotomasinae
- Idiocorinae

== Description ==
Adult bugs in the family Helotrephidae are rounded and similar to Pleidae but the head is fused to the prothorax. The antennae are one or two segmented and the terminal segment has many long hair-like extensions. The scutellum is large and many species are incapable of flight as the hindwings are reduced. The tarsal counts on the fore, mid and hind legs are variable, 3-3-3, 2-2-3, or 1-1-2.

== Ecology ==
Helotrephids are predators that feed on small invertebrates by inserting their proboscis and sucking the body fluids. The obtain air from the water surface and hold a pocket of air between the hemielytra and the abdomen.
