= Stichel =

Stichel is a German surname. Notable persons with the surname include:

- Wolfgang Stichel (1898–1968), German entomologist who specialized in the Heteroptera
- Hans Ferdinand Emil Julius Stichel (1862–1936), German railways officer and lepidopterist
