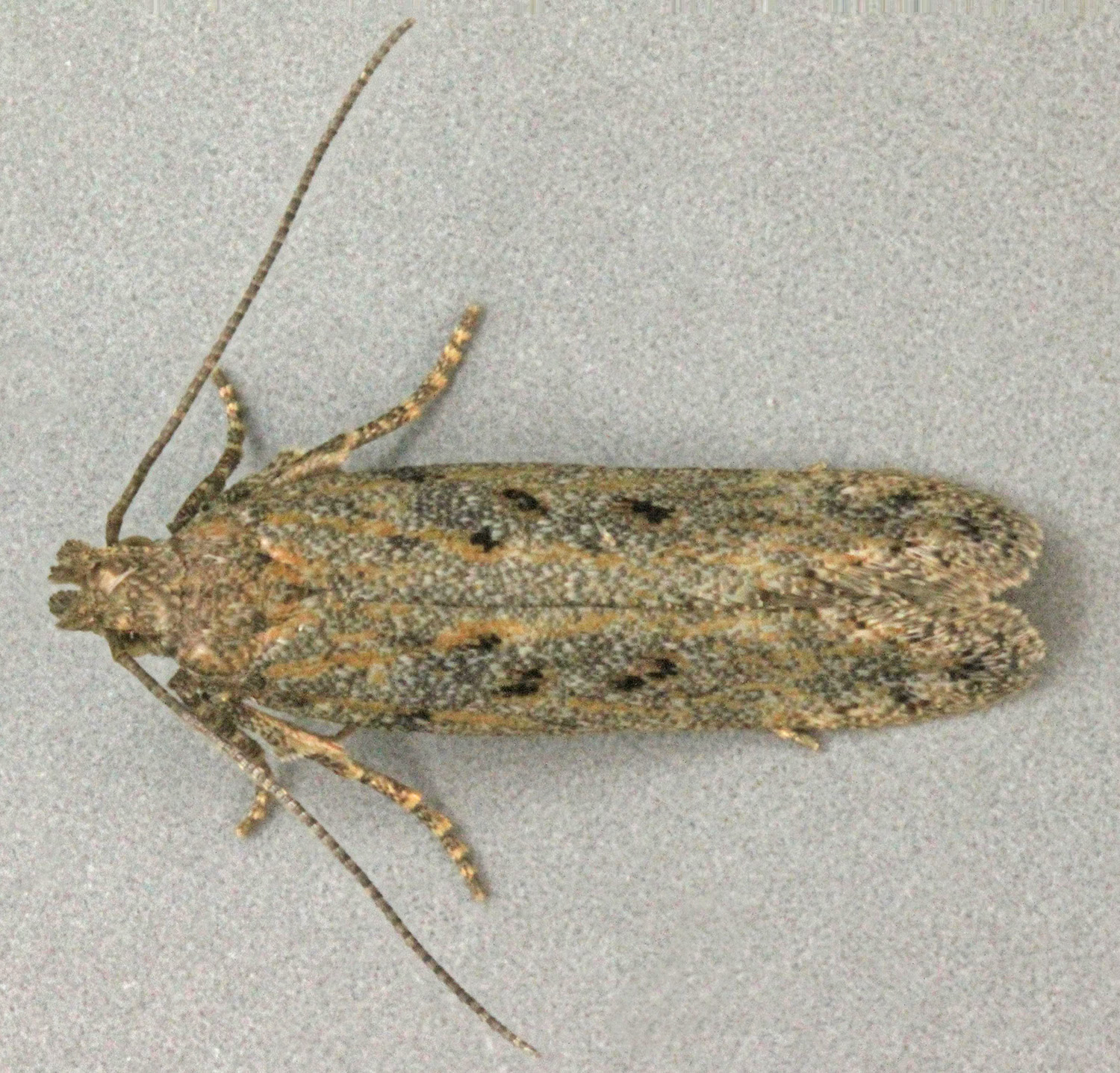
- Scrobipalpa instabilella, Talacre, North Wales, June 2012

Scientific classification
- Domain: Eukaryota
- Kingdom: Animalia
- Phylum: Arthropoda
- Class: Insecta
- Order: Lepidoptera
- Family: Gelechiidae
- Genus: Scrobipalpa
- Species: S. instabilella

Binomial name
- Scrobipalpa instabilella (Douglas, 1846)

Synonyms
- Anacampsis instabilella Douglas, 1846; Gelechia instabilella; Gnorimoschema instabilellum; Lita lagunella Chrétien, 1910; Lita strobilacella Caradja, 1920; Lita salsolella Amsel, 1933; Phthorimaea halymiphaga Amsel, 1952

= Scrobipalpa instabilella =

Species of moth

Scrobipalpa instabilella, the saltern groundling, is a moth in the family Gelechiidae. It was described by John William Douglas in 1846. It is found in on the Canary Islands, in Algeria, Ireland, Great Britain, Portugal, Spain, France, Belgium, the Netherlands, Germany, Denmark, Italy, Sardinia, Sicily, Greece, Cyprus and Palestine. It is also present in the United States, where it has been recorded from California.

The length of the forewings is 5.6–6 mm (0.22–0.24 in). The forewings are uniform lustrous, brownish grey, with scattered ochreous scales and a weak indication of two linear rust coloured stigmata in the cell. The hindwings are pale grey. Meyrick describes it - The head ochreous-grey, face whitish. Terminal joint of palpi as long as second. Forewings brown, irrorated with darker and paler, partly ochreous tinged; towards base two indistinct blackish spots on costa and two on fold; stigmata black, first discal beyond plical, second followed by a black spot, and another on fold beyond plical; sometimes a blackish longitudinal discal suffusion; a pale greyish -ochreous angulated fascia at 3/4. Hindwings 1, light grey. Larva pale yellowish-green; dorsal, subdorsal, and faint spiracular lines brown-reddish; dots blackish; head and plate of 2 somewhat darker.

The moths fly May to July.

The larva feeds on Halimione portulacoides a saltmarsh species.
