= Micronecta minutissima =

Scientific classification
- Kingdom: Animalia
- Phylum: Arthropoda
- Class: Insecta
- Order: Hemiptera
- Suborder: Heteroptera
- Family: Micronectidae
- Genus: Micronecta
- Species: M. minutissima

Binomial name
- Micronecta minutissima (Linnaeus, 1758)

Synonyms
- Micronecta wagneri Linnavuori; Micronecta minuta Fabricius

Species of true bug

Micronecta minutissima is a species of pygmy water boatmen in the family Micronectidae.
