= Attila Budavári =

Hungarian organ builder (born 1970)

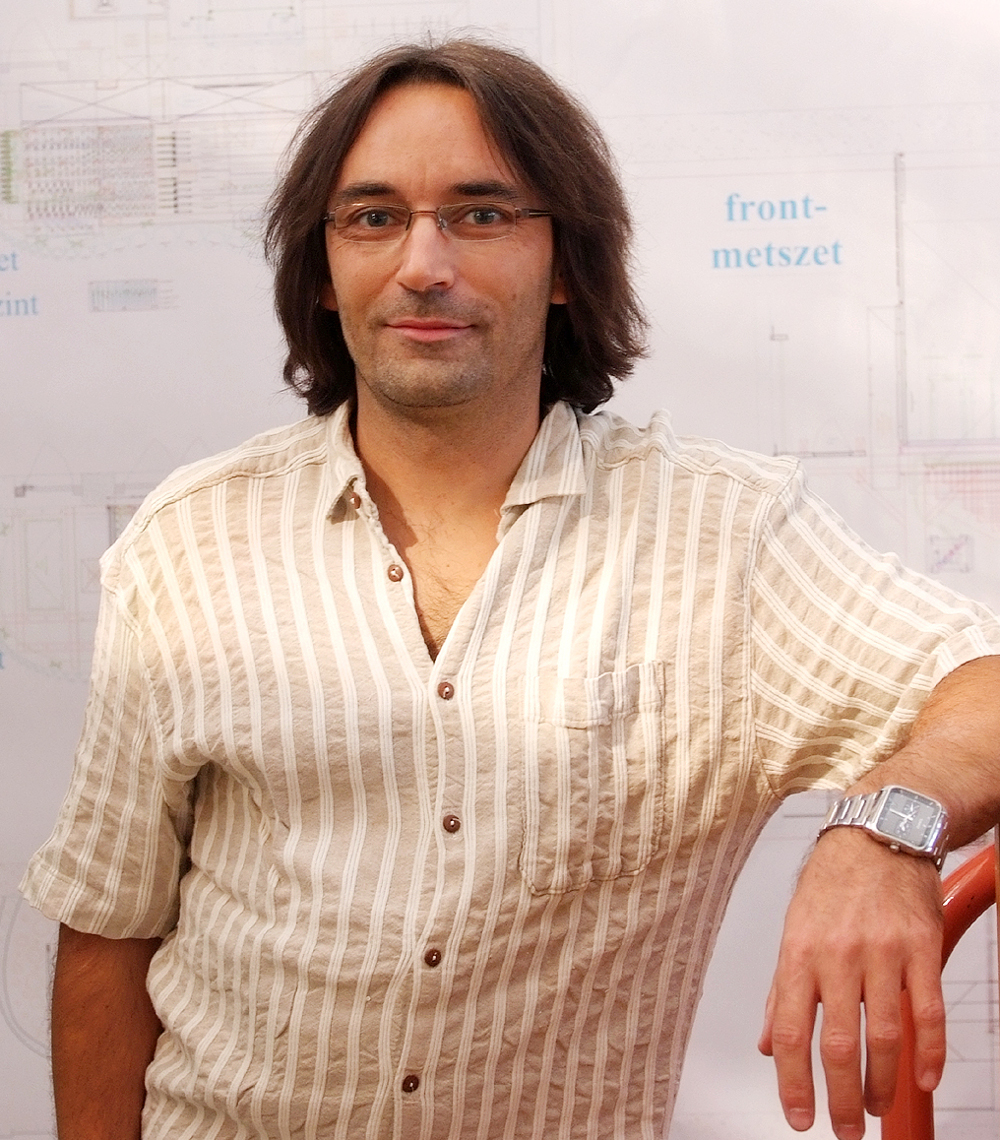

Attila Budavári (1 June 1970) is a Hungarian master organ builder. His organ factory, the Pécs Organ Manufactory, is the biggest organ-building company in Hungary.

== Background ==
Budavári's was born into a family with a long history of organ-builders. His great-great grandfather, Lipót Schiffrich, was first in line and had arrived in Pécs from Vienna to work at the Angster organ-building factory, multiple other relatives followed his footsteps and worked at the same company.

== Education ==
Budavári attended primary and secondary school in Pécs. He continued his education at Kaesz Gyula Apprenticeship Institution in Budapest, between 1988–1990. Afterwards, he traveled to learn how to turn his knowledge about organ building into practice. He has received a masters degree from the Chamber of Crafts Budapest, from the Instrument Crafter and Repair branch. In 2011 he was officially qualified as a Silver-wreath Organbuilder Master.

== Work ==
When Budavári returned to Hungary, he found his own company with his brother, Csaba Budavári. The company is operated out of a workshop in the Budavári's hometown of Pécs. The Pécs Organ Manufactory has become the biggest organ manufacturers of Hungary, and one of the largest in Europe.

In 2009 the company created an online store.

=== Important projects and works ===
Pécs Organ Manufactory have participated in several significant organ installations:

- Palace of Arts, new organ (2006, Budapest Hungary) – Largest organ in Hungary
- Nagyvárad-Szöllős Roman Catholic Church, new organ (2008, Transylvania)
- Zamárdi, new French baroque organ (2010 Zamárdi, Hungary)
- Košice Borrome St. Charles Seminary Church, organ adaptation and expansion (2011, Slovakia)
- Rešica, new organ (2012, Slovakia)
- Fábrica da Igreja Paroquial da Freguesia de Sra da Gloria Aveiro, new organ (2013, Portugal)
- Calvinistic Secondary School of Szentendre, new organ (2013 Budapest, Hungary)
- Calvinistic Parish of Pécs-Kertváros, new organ (2013 Pécs, Hungary) – First organ in Hungary with dual usage slider
- Calvinistic Parish Church Mezőberény, organ restoration (2014 Mezőberény, Hungary
- Matthias Church large organ’s reconstruction (2015, Budapest Hungary)
- Calvinistic Church Kálvin Sq. Budapest, new historic mechanic organ (2015, Budapest Hungary)
- Reformed Church of Fasor, organ reconstruction (2015, Budapest Hungary)
- Zaláta Calvinistic Church, I/8, 2016. Restoration.
- Mátraverebély-Szentkút National Shrine, II/27, 2016. New organ.SOKÓŁ Małopolska Cultural Center, Nowy Sacz, Poland, III/68, 2017. Modernization, expansion.
- Lutheran Church of Buda Castle, Budapest, III/26, 2017. Baroque style new

=== Awards ===
- Pro Civitate Award (2015)
- Ambassador díj (2015)
- József Angster Award (2011) – joint award with Csaba Budavári
