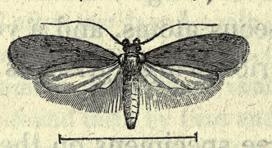

Scientific classification
- Kingdom: Animalia
- Phylum: Arthropoda
- Clade: Pancrustacea
- Class: Insecta
- Order: Lepidoptera
- Family: Depressariidae
- Genus: Agonopterix
- Species: A. rotundella

Binomial name
- Agonopterix rotundella (Douglas, 1846)

Synonyms
- Depressaria rotundella Douglas, 1846; Depressaria peloritanella Zeller, 1847

= Agonopterix rotundella =

Species of moth

Agonopterix rotundella is a moth of the family Depressariidae and is found in most of Europe. It was first described from moths found in Surrey, England by the entomologist John Douglas in 1846.

== Imago ==
The wingspan is 14–17 mm. The forewings are rather narrow, pale greyish-ochreous, sometimes somewhat fuscous sprinkled posteriorly; subbasal mark of dorsum reduced to a dark fuscous dot; first discal stigma absent, a black dot obliquely before and above its usual position, second black dark fuscous terminal dots, sometimes indistinct. Hindwings whitish-grey, darker terminally. The larva is green; dorsal and subdorsal lines darker; head and plate of 2 black

Adults are on wing from September to May, overwintering as an adult.

=== Eggs ===
In Great Britain and Ireland, eggs are laid on the leaves of wild carrot (Daucus carota) during May. Elsewhere in Europe eggs are also laid on Laserpitium gallicum and Distichoselinum tenuifolium.

=== Larva ===
The intermediate and later instars of A. ciliella feed on a variety of umbelliferous plants; larvae of this species and A. rotundella should be reared to confirm the identification.

=== Pupa ===
Found in the soil or amongst detritus.

== Distribution ==
The moth is found in most of Europe, except Fennoscandia and most of the Balkan Peninsula. In Britain, although the type species was found inland it is now confined to coasts. Also found in Iran and Turkey.
