= Teiso Esaki =

Japanese entomologist

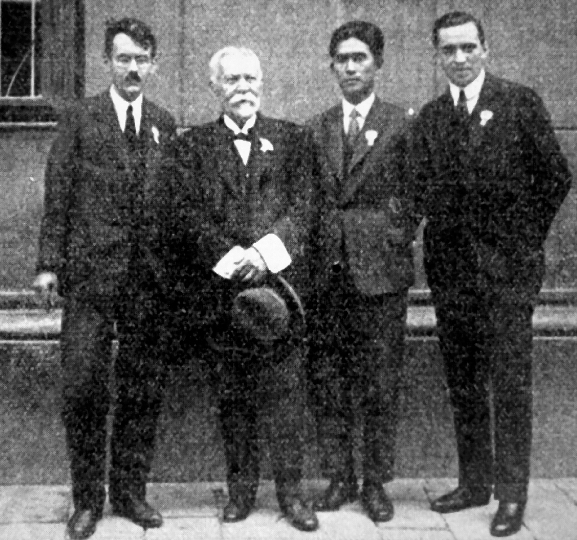
At the International Zoological Congress in Budapest, 1927. Left to right are Tadeusz Jaczewski, Géza Horváth, Teiso Esaki and Wolfgang Stichel.

Teiso Esaki (江崎 梯三, Esaki Teizō; 15 July 1899 – 14 December 1957) was a Japanese entomologist. He authored numerous texts and was one of the founders of entomology in Japan, responsible for training a generation of Japanese entomologists, and founding the journal Zephyrus. He published numerous papers on the insects of Micronesia and was especially interested in aquatic insects and erected the family Helotrephidae along with W.E. China.

Esaki was born in Tokyo and grew up in Osaka. He went to Seventh Higher School Zoshikan (now Kagoshima University) and went to Tokyo Imperial University (now University of Tokyo) in 1920 and received a Ph.D. in 1930. He worked extensively on the heteroptera and focused on the Micronesian region. From 1923 he taught at the College of Agriculture, Kyushu Imperial University, Fukuoka. He left the next year and lived in Europe for about four and half years during which time he learned to speak German, Hungarian, Italian, French and Esperanto. He worked with Geza Horvath on hemiptera at Budapest; in 1926, he worked at the Zoological Museum of Academy of Sciences of USSR in Leningrad. He married Charlotte Johanna Hermine Witte in Germany in 1928. They moved back to Japan in 1929 and he became a professor of entomology in 1930 at Kyushu University. In 1936 he became director of the Hikosan Biological Laboratory, established by baron Takachiho Nobumaro. His major contribution to entomology was the series Insects of Micronesia. He also founded the Japanese journal Zephyrus. A journal named Esakia was established in his name.
