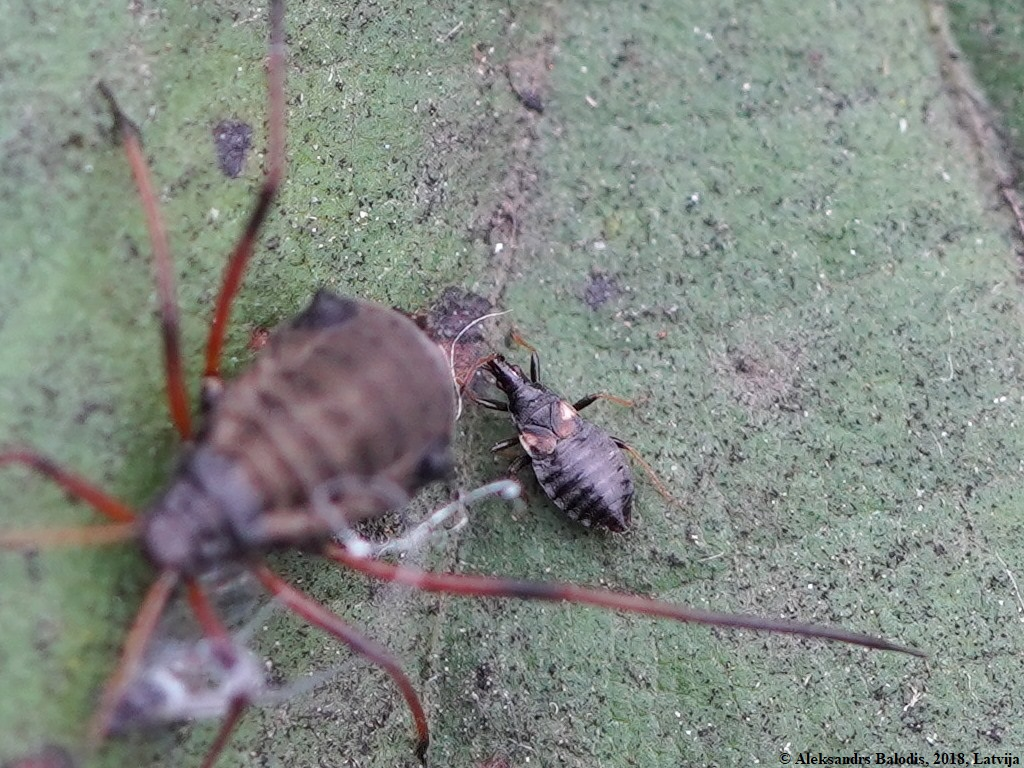

Scientific classification
- Kingdom: Animalia
- Phylum: Arthropoda
- Clade: Pancrustacea
- Class: Insecta
- Order: Hemiptera
- Suborder: Heteroptera
- Family: Anthocoridae
- Genus: Temnostethus
- Species: T. gracilis

Binomial name
- Temnostethus gracilis Horváth, 1907

= Temnostethus gracilis =

Species of true bug

Temnostethus gracilis is a species of minute pirate bug in the family Anthocoridae. It is found in Europe and across the Palearctic to the Caucasus and Siberia (excluding China) and North America.

Temnostethus gracilis lives on the bark of various deciduous trees, both those densely covered with lichens and mosses, and on those that are quite smooth, such as (Fagus sylvatica), common ash (Fraxinus excelsior) or aspens (Populus tremula). They are predatory on aphids, Psylloidea, Psocoptera and mites, but also on other small arthropods.
