= Rešica =

Rešica Reste
- Municipality
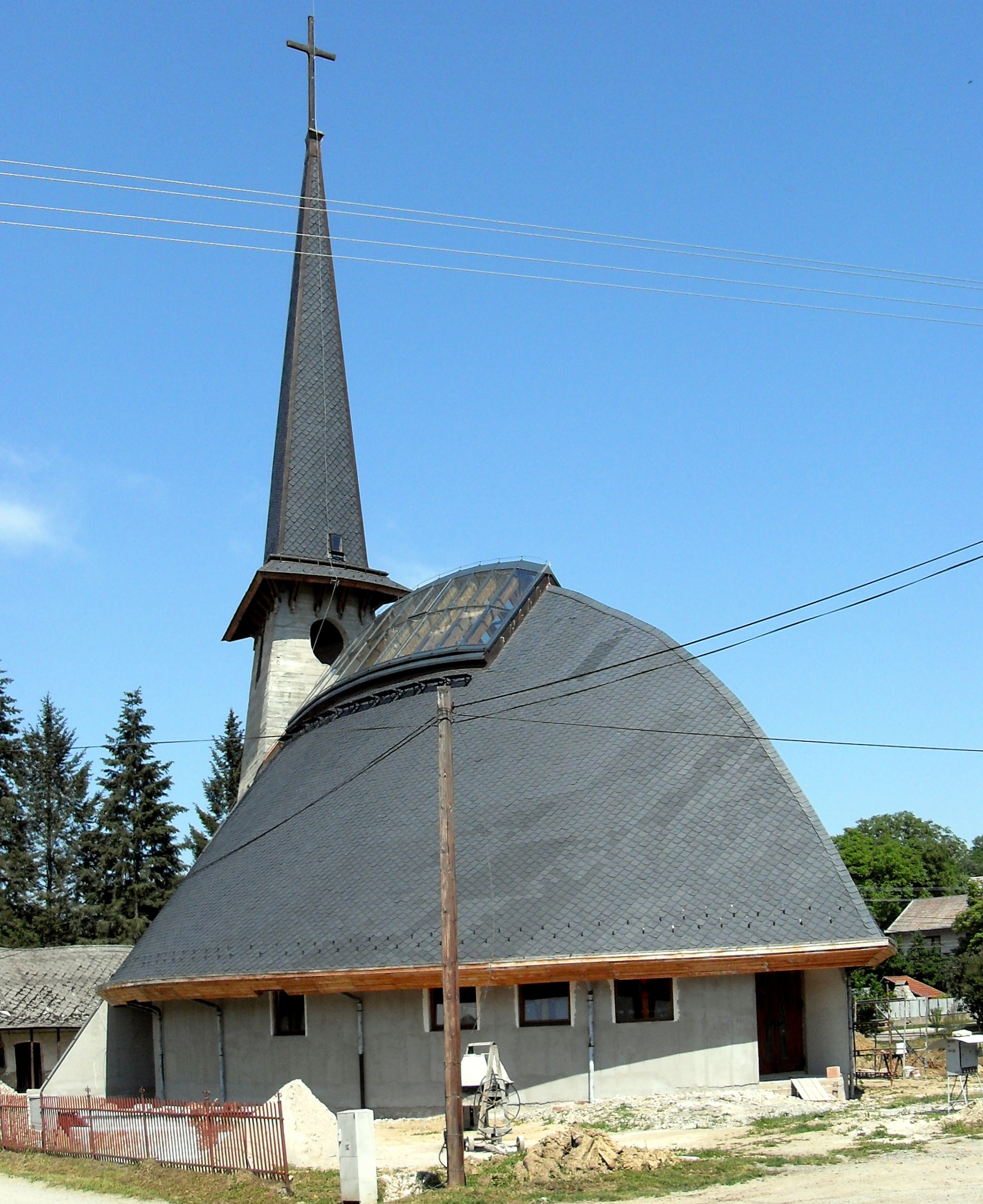

- Flag

- Location of Rešica in the Košice Region Location of Rešica in Slovakia
- Coordinates: 48.55°N 21.05°E
- Country: Slovakia
- Region: Košice Region
- District: Košice-okolie District
- First mentioned: 1319

Area
  - Total: 12.49 km^{2} (4.82 sq mi)
- Elevation: 192 m (630 ft)

Population (2025)
  - Total: 367
- Time zone: UTC+1 (CET)
  - Summer (DST): UTC+2 (CEST)
- Postal code: 447 3
- Area code: +421 55
- Vehicle registration plate (until 2022): KS
- Website: www.resica.sk

Rešica (Hungarian: Reste) is a village and municipality in Košice-okolie District in the Kosice Region of eastern Slovakia.

== Geography ==
The municipality lies at an altitude of 192 metres (630 ft) and covers an area of 12.49 km^{2} (4.82 sq mi) (2025).

== Transport ==
The nearest train station is at Cecejovce.

== Population ==
Population statistic (10 years)
Year	1995	2005	2015	2025
Count	382	367	322	367
Difference		−3.92%	−12.26%	+13.97%

Population statistic
Year	2024	2025
Count	364	367
Difference		+0.82%

It has a population of 367 people (31 December 2025).

=== Ethnicity ===
Census 2021 (1+ %)
Ethnicity	Number	Fraction
Hungarian	263	78.5%
Slovak	104	31.04%
Not found out	9	2.68%
Total	335	

In year 2021 was 335 people by ethnicity 263 as Hungarian, 104 as Slovak, 9 as Not found out and 1 as Other.

Note on population: The difference values of population numbers in the table "Population statistic" and in the sections "Ethnicity" & "Religion" is caused by the use of various statistical methods.

=== Religion ===
Census 2021 (1+ %)
Religion	Number	Fraction
Roman Catholic Church	242	72.24%
Calvinist Church	45	13.43%
None	21	6.27%
Not found out	13	3.88%
Evangelical Church	7	2.09%
Greek Catholic Church	4	1.19%
Total	335	

In year 2021 was 335 people by religion 242 from Roman Catholic Church, 45 from Calvinist Church, 21 from None, 13 from Not found out, 7 from Evangelical Church, 4 from Greek Catholic Church, 2 from Islam and 1 from Jehovah's Witnesses.
