= Aladár Árkay =

Hungarian architect, craftsman, and painter

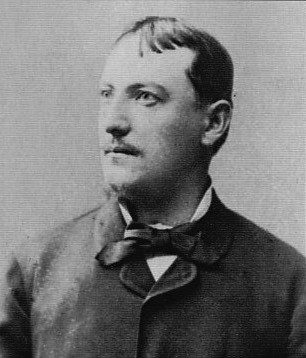
Aladár Árkay (ca 1900)

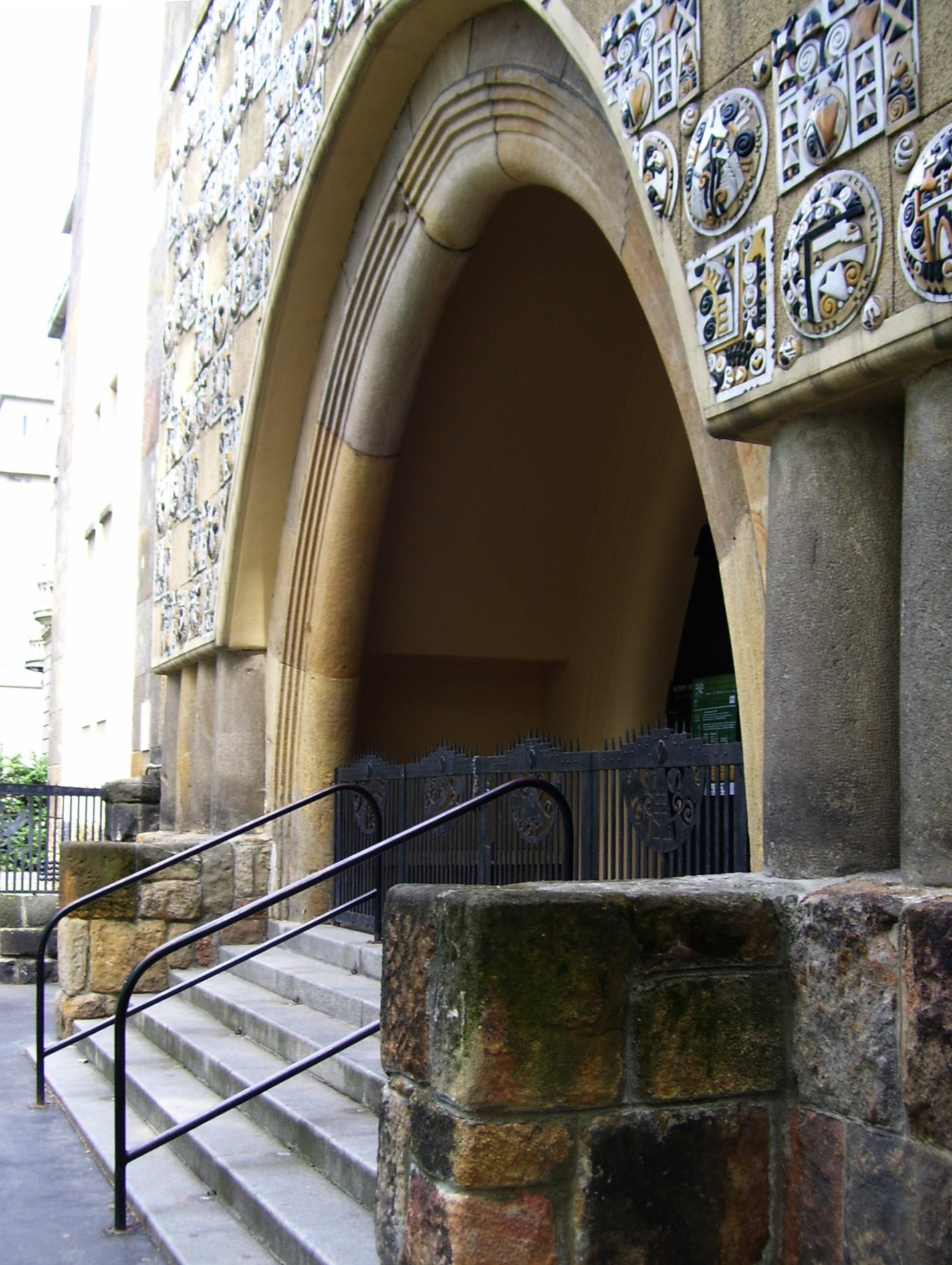
Budapest: Fasori Reformed Church, portal

Aladár Árkay (Temesvár, February 1, 1868 – Budapest, February 2, 1932) was a Hungarian architect, craftsman, and painter.

== Career ==
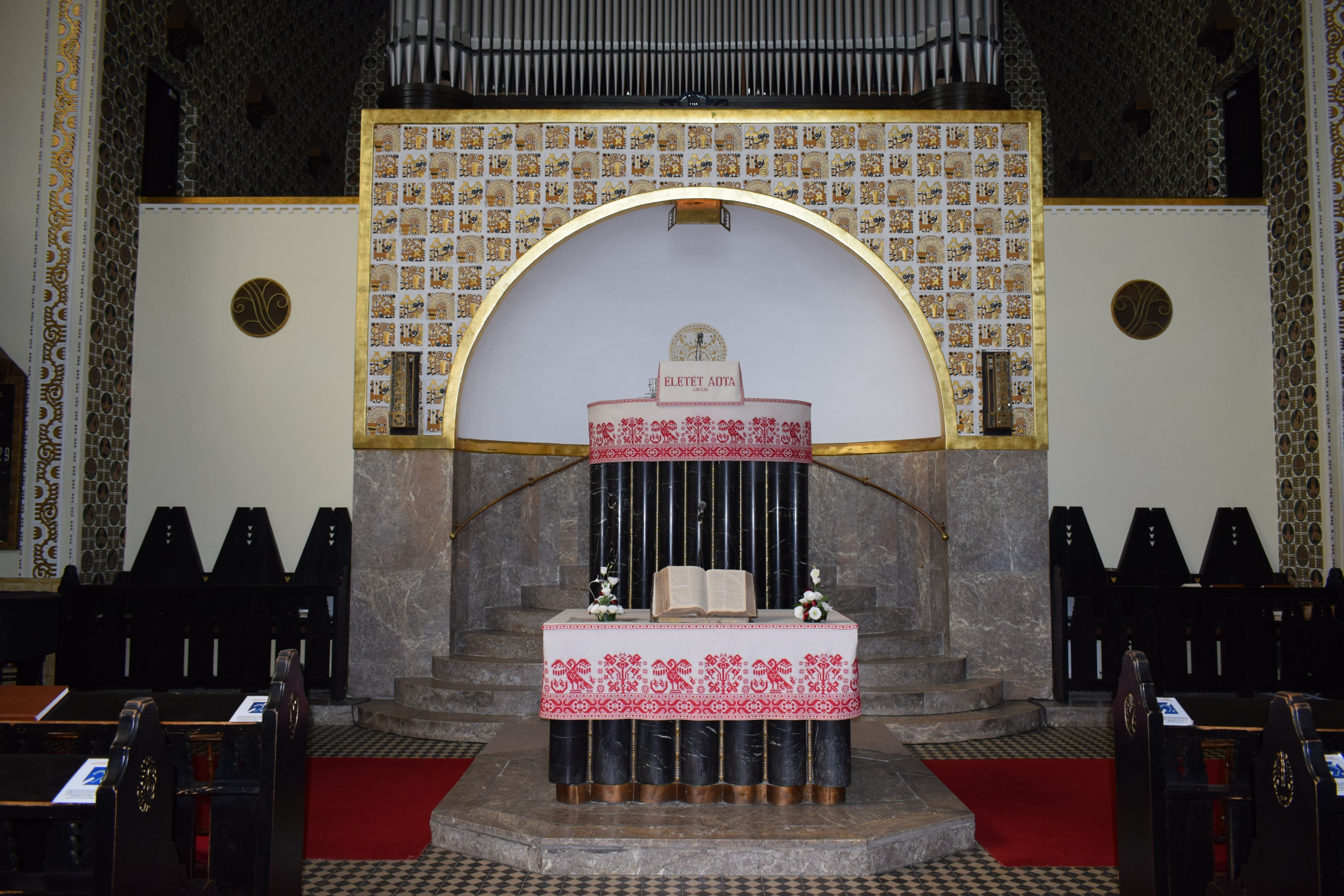
The pulpit of the Fasori church

Árkay gained his degree at the Budapest Technical University where he studied under Ede Balló. Initially he worked in the firm of Fellner and Hellmer, then with Alajos Hauszmann in the works on Buda Castle. Later he formed a partnership with his father-in-law, Mor Kallina, and together they were responsible for the Directorate of Defence building in the Castle district (1896, since destroyed), the Buda Vigadó hall in Corvin Square (1896–97) and the St. Gellért memorial on Gellért Hill (1904–05). Initially working in the eclectic style, as his career developed he worked in more modern forms such as secessionism and modernism. His first major independently completed work was the Babocsay villa, which later became the Yugoslav embassy, in district VI of Budapest (1905). He also worked on many church projects, the most significant of these being the Fasori Reformed Church in Budapest and the Győr factory district's Catholic Church, both completed during the late 1920s. He took part and won numerous competitions, such as that for the Győr theatre (1929) and the planning of Erzsébet avenue in the capital. He was in the process of planning his magnum opus, the Városmajor Catholic Church in Budapest, when he died. It was finished by his son Bertalan, also an architect.

== Other works ==
- Bulgarian Orthodox Church, Ferencváros (Budapest)
- Catholic Memorial Church, Mohács
- Platzgestaltung und Bebauung des Calvin-Platzes in Budapest (Mitarbeit Oskar Schober Mai 1912-Feber 1913)
- Neues Nationaltheather in Budapest Wettbewerb (Mitarbeit Oskar Schober Mai 1912-Feber 1913) nicht realisiert
- Wohn- u. Warenhaus mit einem Kinotheater für 650 Personen in Budapest (Mitarbeit Oskar Schober Mai 1912-Feber 1913)
- Grabdenkmäler u. Ausstellungshallen in Budapest (Mitarbeit Oskar Schober Mai 1912 – Feber 1913)
