= Takachiho Nobumaro =

Baron Takachiho Nobumaro
- 高千穂 宣麿
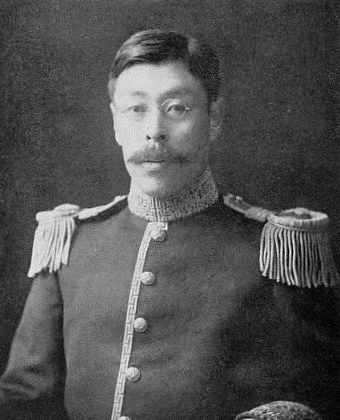

Member of the House of Peers
- In office 10 July 1918 – 9 July 1925 Elected by the Barons
- In office 3 August 1907 – 9 July 1911 Elected by the Barons

Personal details
- Born: Tokudaiji Nobumaro; 12 January 1865 Kyoto, Yamashiro, Japan
- Died: 23 December 1950 (aged 85)
- Parent: Tokudaiji Sanetsune (father)
- Relatives: Tokudaiji family

Baron Nobumaro Takachiho (12 January 1865 – 23 December 1950) was a Japanese nobleman and entomologist who was involved in establishing the Hikosan Biological Laboratory on the slope of Mt. Hikosan (1,200 m). Founded in 1936 it was donated and merged into Kyushu University.

Takachiho was born in Kyoto. After studies in Tokyo he went to the pursue Shugendo at the Hikosan Jinja shrine in Kyushu in 1883. The shrine is at 600 m above sea level. Here he became a chief priest, a hereditary position, and also took an interest in the insect life of the region. He began to make a collection of the insects. In 1900 he started what was called the Takachiho Entomological Laboratory. In 1903 it was made a satellite institution of Kyushu University and called the Kyushu Entomological Laboratory. A close collaborator was Inokichi Kuwana. On 20 October 1936, the institution was renamed as the Hikosan Biological Laboratory with a donation towards the constructions of buildings from businessman and owner of Nakayama Steel Works, Etsuji Nakayama (1883–1951), it was donated by Takachiho to the government. The first director of the institution was Teiso Esaki. The institute stands in 33,000 m^{2} land that belonged to Baron Takachiho's family.
