= Tadeusz Jaczewski =

Polish entomologist (1899–1974)

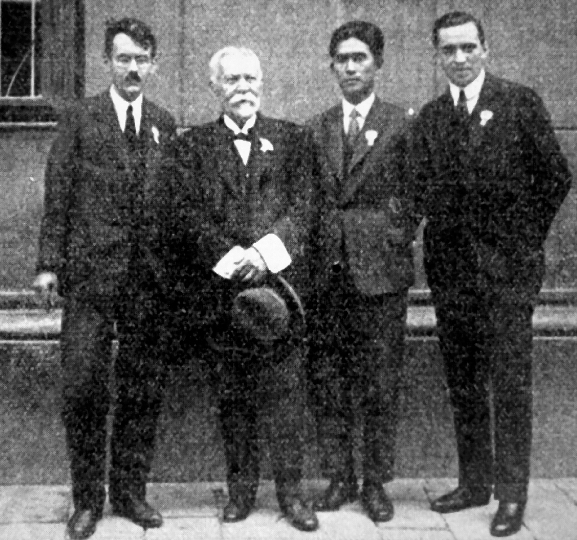
At the International Zoological Congress in Budapest, 1927. Left to right are Tadeusz Jaczewski, Géza Horváth, Teiso Esaki and Wolfgang Stichel.

Tadeusz Antoni Franciszek Jaczewski (1 February 1899, Saint Petersburg – 25 February 1974) was a Polish entomologist who specialised in Hemiptera.

== Life and work ==
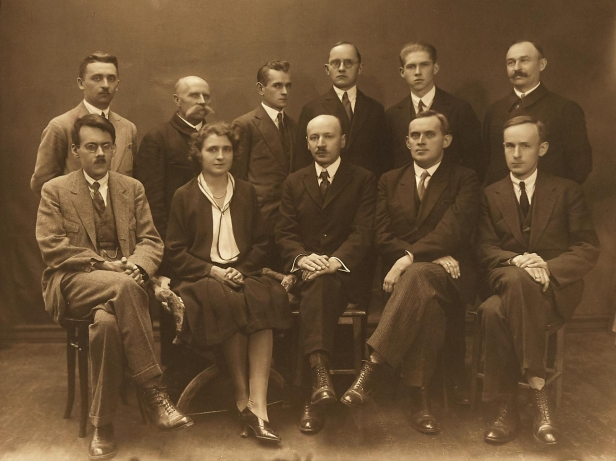
Jaczewski, seated leftmost, 1928

Jaczewski was born in St. Petersburg, the son of geologist Leonard (1858—1916) and Helena née Biron. Introduced to science at an early age. After attending a German classical gymnasium he studied at the Saint Petersburg State University. He then went to the University of Warsaw and graduated from there. He worked at the Warsaw Zoological Museum. In 1921, he took part in the Third Silesian Uprising. In December he joined an expedition to Brazil led by Tadeusz Chrostowski. He received a doctorate from the University of Poznan in 1925 and taught geography in schools in Warsaw until 1935. In 1929, he became the curator for the entomological collection and in 1937 he headed the Zoology department. During World War II he served in the 16th Warsaw Defense Company. During the German occupation many specimens were stolen from the museum by invading Nazi forces and Jaczewski was involved in repatriation of stolen material following the war. He published many papers on the insect fauna of Poland and with I.M Kerzhner 1964 wrote Order Hemiptera (Heteroptera). In Bei-Bienko, G. Ya. (ed.), Keys to the insects of the European USSR 1: 655-845 1964.He was a specialist in Nepomorpha. He retired in 1969 but continued to teach.

== Other sources ==
- Schuh, Randall, T and Slater, J.A. 1995 True bugs of the world (Hemiptera:Heteroptera) : classification and natural history Ithaca : Comstock Pub. Associates ISBN 0-8014-2066-0
