= Károly Sajó =

Hungarian entomologist (1851–1939)

Sajó in 1925

Károly Sajó born Schemiz (20 June 1851 – 9 February 1939) was a Hungarian entomologist, writer, and teacher. He studied the beetles of the region and wrote several popular works on insects. He was among the first to recognize winter and summer diapause in adult leaf-beetles. The entomologist Barnabás Nagy (1921–2020) called him the “Hungarian Jean-Henri Fabre”.

== Life and work ==
Sajó was born in Győr, the son of German-speaking physician Károly Schemiz. The senior Károly Schemiz was born in Sasvár-Morvaőr (Nyitra County, now Šaštín-Stráže in Slovakia, Schoßberg-Strascha in German) and had trained in Vienna before practising in Győr after 1835 until his death in 1865. His son went to Gymnasium in Győr and entered Pest University to train in the natural sciences. He then studied languages and taught at Ungvár Gymnasium from 1877 to 1888. He married Ilona Kvassay (sister of the hydrologist Jenő Kvassay) in 1873 and they had three sons who took the surname Kvassay-Sajó. He was invited by Géza Horváth to entomology research and became an entomologist at the Phylloxera research station. He chose to retire in 1895 due to deafness following scarlet fever and moved to his wife's family estate and lived in Őrszentmiklós, working on a farm and studying insects, and writing about them. He wrote popular works on sleep in insects, weather and insect life and took an interest in what is now known as diapause in the turnip beetle Entomoscelis adonidis. He was the first to suggest that the adults were in "winter dormancy" or Winterschlaf as well as a summer dormancy or "Sommerschlaf". This was confirmed by Wilhelm Kolbe who saw similar phenomena in Gonioctena viminalis and Chrysolina sanguinolenta in 1899. Sajó was a member of the Hungarian Entomological Society and the Hungarian Natural History Society. In 1924, the American journal Science carried a note on the demise of Sajó and how America was enriched by his insect collections which he had sold during the depression years of World War I. In June 1925 Alfred Kinsey wrote a correction about receiving a letter from Sajó who was very much alive. After the death of his wife, he married her sister Júlia Kvassay. Much of his work and writings were destroyed in World War II and a few of his specimens survive in the Hungarian Natural History Museum in Budapest.

Sajó studied German only later in life even though his father knew German. He later studied French and English. He liked the works of Goethe and Schiller and many of his literary works were in German under the German form Karl Sajo. He wrote 15 articles and shorter notes. He wrote books on the Moroccan locust Dociostaurus maroccanus following an outbreak in 1888. He also studied the life histories of various Chrysomelidae and examined ways of reducing damage in agriculture. He also studied some wasps and bugs. He had a large insect collection. Sajó was also involved in conservation efforts in Hungary and wrote about the preservation of habitats. He did not accept evolutionary explanations of insect coloration.
