= Keeper of Entomology, Natural History Museum =

The Keeper of Entomology was an entomological academic position within the Natural History Museum, London. The Keeper of Entomology served as the head of the Department of Entomology within the Museum. Originally, the post ranked as an Assistant Keeper to the Keeper of Zoology, known as the Assistant Keeper in Charge of Insects but reorganisation in 1913 saw entomology get its own department. Both are listed below:

== Assistant Keepers in Charge of Insects ==
- Arthur Gardiner Butler 1895–1901
- George Francis Hampson (acting) 1901–1905
- Charles Owen Waterhouse 1905–1910
- Charles Joseph Gahan 1910–1913

== Keepers of Entomology ==
- Charles Joseph Gahan 1913–1927
- Ernest Edward Austen 1927–1932
- Norman Denbigh Riley 1932–1955
- William Edward China 1955–1960
- John Priestman Doncaster 1960–1968
- Paul Freeman 1968–1981
- Laurence Mound 1981–1992
- Richard Lane 1992–1997
- Rory Post (Acting) 1997–1998
- Richard Irwin Vane-Wright 1998–2004
- Quentin D. Wheeler 2004–2006
- Martin Hall (Acting) 2006
- Malcolm Scoble 2006–2010
- Andrew Polaszek (Acting) 2010–2012

The Department of Entomology was merged with the Departments of Zoology and Botany in 2012 to form the Department of Life Sciences.
