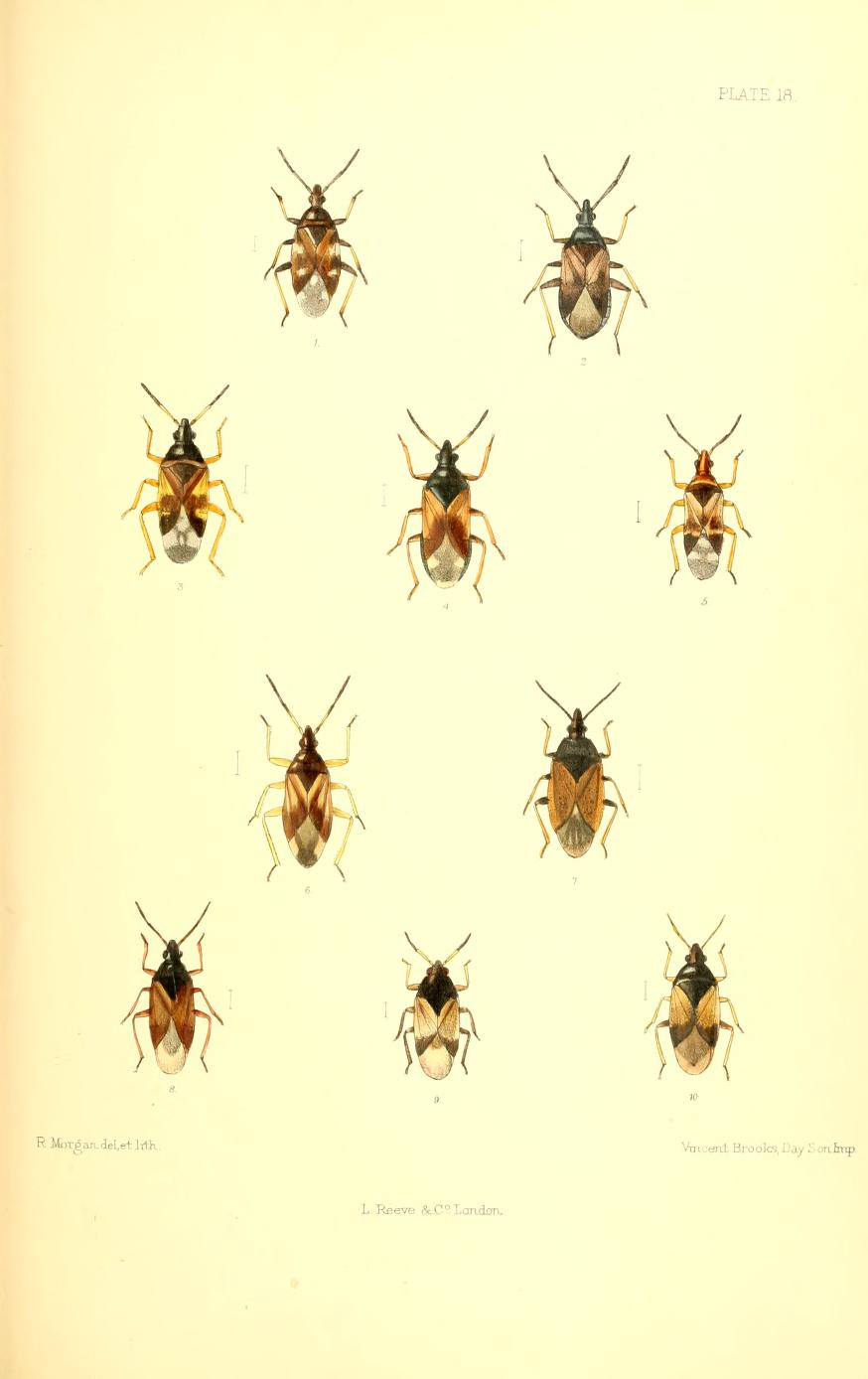
- Temnostethus pusillus depicted in Edward Saunders Hemiptera Heteroptera of the British Islands (figure 1)

Scientific classification
- Kingdom: Animalia
- Phylum: Arthropoda
- Clade: Pancrustacea
- Class: Insecta
- Order: Hemiptera
- Suborder: Heteroptera
- Family: Anthocoridae
- Genus: Temnostethus
- Species: T. pusillus

Binomial name
- Temnostethus pusillus (Herrich-Schäffer, 1835)

= Temnostethus pusillus =

Species of true bug

Temnostethus pusillus is a true bug in the family Anthocoridae. The species is found in the West Palearctic. It is a small zoophage frequently occurring on ash or apple bark where it preys on aphids, leaf suckers, and scale insects (Coccidae)
