= Temnostethus =

Scientific classification
- Kingdom: Animalia
- Phylum: Arthropoda
- Clade: Pancrustacea
- Class: Insecta
- Order: Hemiptera
- Suborder: Heteroptera
- Family: Anthocoridae
- Tribe: Anthocorini
- Genus: Temnostethus; Fieber, 1860

Genus of true bugs

Temnostethus is a genus of minute pirate bugs in the family Anthocoridae. There are about eight described species in Temnostethus.

== Species ==
These eight species belong to the genus Temnostethus:

- Temnostethus dacicus (Puton, 1888)
- Temnostethus fastigiatus Drake & Harris, 1926
- Temnostethus gracilis Horváth, 1907
- Temnostethus lunula Wagner, 1952
- Temnostethus pusillus (Herrich-Schaeffer, 1835)
- Temnostethus reduvinus (Herrich-Schäffer, 1850)
- Temnostethus wichmanni Wagner, 1961
- † Temnostethus blandus Statz & Wagner, 1950
