= Wolfgang Stichel =

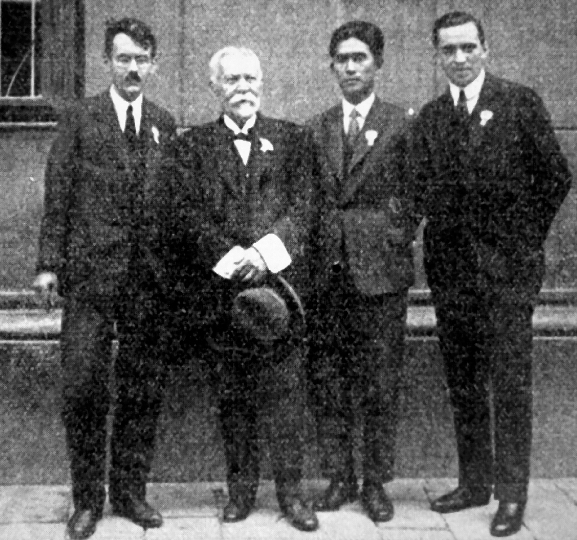
At the International Zoological Congress in Budapest, 1927. Left to right are Tadeusz Jaczewski, Géza Horváth, Teiso Esaki and Wolfgang Stichel.

Hans Wolfgang Stichel (18 November 1898 – 31 January 1968) was a German zoologist and entomologist. He wrote a book on the identification of bugs. During the Third Reich, he became a member of the NSDAP and served in the Waffen-SS as an Untersturmfuhrer. He was involved in the denouncement of his colleague Walther Arndt, who was executed for holding critical views against the Nazis.

== Life ==
Stichel was born in Schöneberg, Berlin, Germany. He was the son of Hans Ferdinand Emil Julius Stichel, a railway inspector and amateur lepidopterist. Wolfgang served during World War I and was wounded. He received a doctorate in 1923 from Berlin University with a thesis on the relationships within a subfamily of ground beetles. In 1924, Stichel played a significant role in establishing the nature reserve on the Pfaueninsel (Peacock Island) and studying its fauna. From 1926, he worked as an assistant and deputy head of the research center for fur animal science at the Forestry University in Tharandt, Saxony, under Heinrich Prell. In 1928, he became the curator of the Fur Animal and Fur Research in Leipzig. From February 1, 1939, he worked as a scientific expert for the German Settlers' Association in Berlin, assisting in small-scale gardening, small-animal breeding, pest control, and fur production. From 1923, he edited the "Zeitschrift für wissenschaftliche Insektenbiologie" and the "Neue Beiträge zur systematischen Insektenkunde". He was also the publisher of the "Zeitschrift für Säugetierkunde," from its foundation in 1926 until the last wartime issue in 1942.

In 1943, Stichel reported his colleague Walther Arndt to the Gestapo for making critical statements about the Third Reich. Arndt was sentenced on May 11, 1944, and executed on June 26. After World War II, Stichel was arrested and sentenced to eight years of hard labor for crimes against humanity. He served six years and eight months of the sentence. After release in 1954, he continued to work on entomology, as well as a genealogy of the Stichel family.
