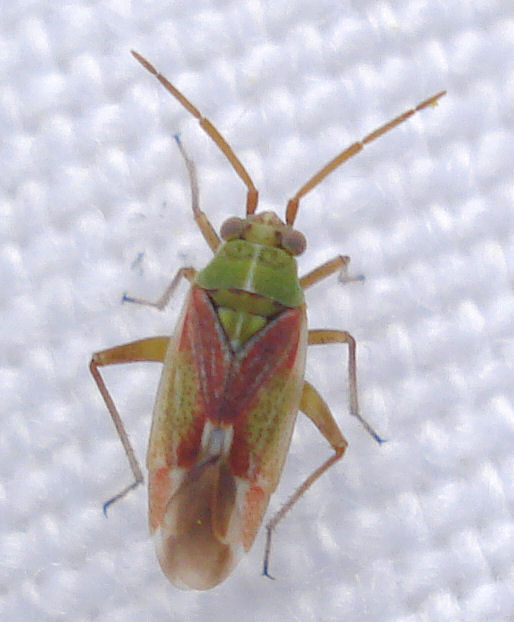
- Conostethus venustus

Scientific classification
- Kingdom: Animalia
- Phylum: Arthropoda
- Class: Insecta
- Order: Hemiptera
- Suborder: Heteroptera
- Family: Miridae
- Subfamily: Phylinae
- Tribe: Phylini
- Subtribe: Phylina
- Genus: Conostethus; Fieber, 1858

= Conostethus =

Genus of true bugs

Conostethus is a genus of true bugs belonging to the family Miridae.

== Species ==
The following species are recognised in the genus Conostethus:

- Conostethus angustus
- Conostethus brevis
- Conostethus griseus
- Conostethus hungaricus
- Conostethus major
- Conostethus roseus
- Conostethus venustus
