= Synaptonecta =

Scientific classification
- Domain: Eukaryota
- Kingdom: Animalia
- Phylum: Arthropoda
- Class: Insecta
- Order: Hemiptera
- Suborder: Heteroptera
- Family: Micronectidae
- Subfamily: Micronectinae
- Genus: Synaptonecta; Lundblad, 1933
- Species: S. issa

Binomial name
- Synaptonecta issa (Distant, 1910)

Genus of insects

Synaptonecta is a genus of water boatmen in the family Micronectidae. There is one described species in Synaptonecta, S. issa.
