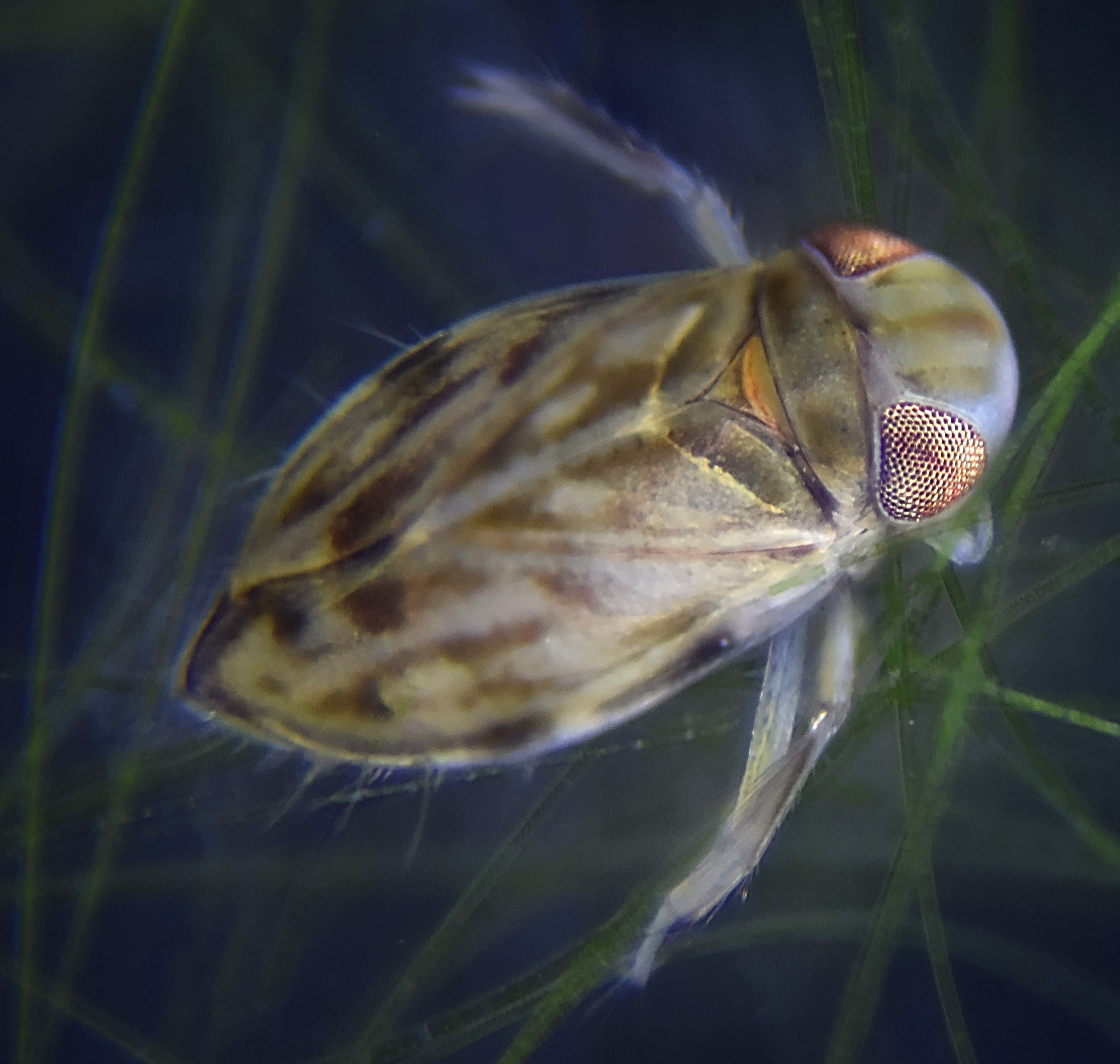
- Micronecta scholtzi

Scientific classification
- Domain: Eukaryota
- Kingdom: Animalia
- Phylum: Arthropoda
- Class: Insecta
- Order: Hemiptera
- Suborder: Heteroptera
- Family: Micronectidae
- Subfamily: Micronectinae
- Genus: Micronecta; Kirkaldy, 1897

Synonyms
- Micronectella Lundblad, 1933; Unguinecta Nieser, Chen & Yang, 2005

= Micronecta =

Genus of true bugs

Micronecta is a genus of aquatic bugs in the family Micronectidae (formerly in Corixidae) erected by George Willis Kirkaldy in 1897. Species have been recorded mostly from Europe, Africa, Asia and Australia and are sometimes placed in up to 10 subgenera (with species incertae sedis); the subgenera Dichaetonecta Hitchinson, 1940 and Micronecta are recorded from Europe.

== Species ==
The Global Biodiversity Information Facility lists:

1. Micronecta abra Nieser & P.Chen, 2003
2. Micronecta abyssinica Hutchinson, 1932
3. Micronecta acuminata Ha & Tran, 2021
4. Micronecta acuta (Lundblad, 1933)
5. Micronecta adelaidae L.Chen, 1965
6. Micronecta albifrons (Motschulsky, 1863)
7. Micronecta aleksanderi Nieser & P.Chen, 1999
8. Micronecta algirica Poisson, 1928
9. Micronecta altera Wróblewski, 1972
10. Micronecta ambositrae Poisson, 1951
11. Micronecta anatolica Lindberg, 1922
12. Micronecta annae Kirkaldy, 1905
13. Micronecta arcuata Ha & Tran, 2021
14. Micronecta batilla Hale, 1922
15. Micronecta bebedjana Linnavuori, 1981
16. Micronecta bekilyi Poisson, 1951
17. Micronecta biimpressa Horváth, 1899
18. Micronecta biskrensis Horváth, 1899
19. Micronecta bleekiana Hutchinson, 1929
20. Micronecta borealis Lundblad, 1936
21. Micronecta brachynota Horváth, 1899
22. Micronecta browni Hutchinson, 1929
23. Micronecta butleriana Hutchinson, 1929
24. Micronecta caperata Ha & Tran, 2021
25. Micronecta capitata Horváth, 1899
26. Micronecta carbonaria Horváth, 1904
27. Micronecta carpatica Wróblewski, 1958
28. Micronecta ceylonica Wróblewski, 1968
29. Micronecta charakta Nieser, 2002
30. Micronecta christiniana Lansbury, 1954
31. Micronecta citharistia Hutchinson, 1929
32. Micronecta clavata Ha & Tran, 2021
33. Micronecta compar Horváth, 1926
34. Micronecta concordia King, 1997
35. Micronecta cornuta Wagner, 1952
36. Micronecta cultellata Ha & Tran, 2021
37. Micronecta daedala Distant, 1910
38. Micronecta decipiens Horváth, 1899
39. Micronecta decorata Lundblad, 1933
40. Micronecta dekeyseri Poisson, 1957
41. Micronecta denticulata Hutchinson, 1930
42. Micronecta dentifera Nieser, 2002
43. Micronecta desertana Distant, 1920
44. Micronecta dimakoana Linnavuori, 1981
45. Micronecta dimidiata Poisson, 1928
46. Micronecta distans (Rey, 1890)
47. Micronecta dixonia King, 1997
48. Micronecta djaloni Poisson, 1960
49. Micronecta dorothea Hutchinson, 1929
50. Micronecta drepani Nieser, 2000
51. Micronecta druryana Hutchinson, 1929
52. Micronecta dubia China, 1924
53. Micronecta ennedina Dispons, 1965
54. Micronecta erato Kirkaldy, 1905
55. Micronecta erythra Nieser, P.Chen & Yang, 2005
56. Micronecta eucosmeta Hutchinson, 1940
57. Micronecta eupompe Hutchinson, 1930
58. Micronecta fascioclavus L.Chen, 1960
59. Micronecta felix (Butler, 1879)
60. Micronecta fernandoi Wróblewski, 1964
61. Micronecta fieberi Wróblewski, 1968
62. Micronecta flavens Wróblewski, 1960
63. Micronecta formosana Matsumura, 1915
64. Micronecta fugitans Breddin, 1905
65. Micronecta fulva Paiva, 1918
66. Micronecta fulvopicta Ha & Tran, 2021
67. Micronecta gorogaiqua Hutchinson, 1929
68. Micronecta gracilis Hale, 1922
69. Micronecta grisea (Fieber, 1844)
70. Micronecta griseola Horváth, 1899
71. Micronecta guttata Matsumura, 1905
72. Micronecta guttatostriata Lundblad, 1933
73. Micronecta halei L.Chen, 1965
74. Micronecta haliploides Horváth, 1904
75. Micronecta hessei Hutchinson, 1929
76. Micronecta hovana Poisson, 1938
77. Micronecta hummeli Lundblad, 1934
78. Micronecta hungerfordi L.Chen, 1960
79. Micronecta hutchinsoni Jaczewski, 1932
80. Micronecta illiesi Wróblewski, 1970
81. Micronecta inconspicua Lundblad, 1933
82. Micronecta isis Horváth, 1899
83. Micronecta jaczewskii Wróblewski, 1962
84. Micronecta janssoni Nieser, P.Chen & Yang, 2005
85. Micronecta janssoni Thirumalai, 1989
86. Micronecta japonica L.Chen, 1960
87. Micronecta jenkinae Hutchinson, 1932
88. Micronecta jenniferae Tinerella, 2006
89. Micronecta johorensis Fernando, 1964
90. Micronecta khasiensis Hutchinson, 1940
91. Micronecta kiritshenkoi Wróblewski, 1963
92. Micronecta kymatista Nieser & P.Chen, 1999
93. Micronecta lakimi P.Chen, Nieser & Lapidin, 2015
94. Micronecta lansburyi Wróblewski, 1972
95. Micronecta latiuscula Horváth, 1899
96. Micronecta lemnae Nieser, 2000
97. Micronecta lenticularis L.Chen, 1960
98. Micronecta leongi Nieser, 2002
99. Micronecta lesnei Poisson, 1934
100. Micronecta leucocephala (Spinola, 1837)
101. Micronecta liewi P.Chen, Nieser & Lapidin, 2015
102. Micronecta lobata Nieser, P.Chen & Yang, 2005
103. Micronecta ludibunda Breddin, 1905
104. Micronecta lumutensis P.Chen, Nieser & Lansbury, 2008
105. Micronecta macentai Poisson, 1960
106. Micronecta macrothoracica Jordan, 1943
107. Micronecta maculata Nieser, 2002
108. Micronecta mahajambae Poisson, 1952
109. Micronecta major L.Chen, 1965
110. Micronecta malayana Leong, 1966
111. Micronecta mateui Dispons, 1965
112. Micronecta matsumurai Miyamoto, 1965
113. Micronecta mauritanica Poisson, 1939
114. Micronecta melanochroa Nieser, P.Chen & Yang, 2005
115. Micronecta melanopardala Nieser & P.Chen, 2003
116. Micronecta memonides Kirkaldy, 1905
117. Micronecta mesmini Poisson, 1939
118. Micronecta minuscula Poisson, 1929
119. Micronecta minutissima (Linnaeus, 1758)
  - type species
120. Micronecta monomatapae Hutchinson, 1929
121. Micronecta ngayai Poisson, 1960
122. Micronecta nieseri Ha & Tran, 2021
123. Micronecta obstusa Yang, 1966
124. Micronecta obtusa Yang, 1966
125. Micronecta omeriana Hutchinson, 1930
126. Micronecta opaca Linnavuori, 1971
127. Micronecta orientalis Wróblewski, 1960
128. Micronecta ornitheia Nieser, P.Chen & Yang, 2005
129. Micronecta ovivora (Westwood, 1871)
130. Micronecta pacheta Nieser & P.Chen, 2003
131. Micronecta pachynychi Nieser & P.Chen, 1999
132. Micronecta paragoga Tinerella, 2013
133. Micronecta perparva Horváth, 1913
134. Micronecta piccanin Hutchinson, 1929
135. Micronecta pilosa Poisson, 1938
136. Micronecta pingae Ha & Tran, 2021
137. Micronecta plicata (Costa, 1878)
138. Micronecta pocsi Wróblewski, 1967
139. Micronecta poikila Nieser et al., 2004
140. Micronecta polhemusi Nieser, 2000
141. Micronecta poweri (Douglas & Scott, 1869)
142. Micronecta praetermissa Poisson, 1938
143. Micronecta prashadana Hutchinson, 1940
144. Micronecta proba Distant, 1910
145. Micronecta pumilio Lundblad, 1933
146. Micronecta punctata Horváth, 1904
147. Micronecta punctinotum L.Chen, 1960
148. Micronecta pusilla (Horváth, 1895)
149. Micronecta quadriseta Lundblad, 1933
150. Micronecta quadristrigata Breddin, 1905
151. Micronecta queenslandica L.Chen, 1965
152. Micronecta quewalepele Hutchinson, 1929
153. Micronecta ras Hutchinson, 1930
154. Micronecta robusta Hale, 1922
155. Micronecta sahlbergi (Jakovlev, 1881)
156. Micronecta sambiranoi Poisson, 1951
157. Micronecta sanctaecatherinae Hutchinson, 1940
158. Micronecta scholtzi (Fieber, 1860)
159. Micronecta scutellaris (Stål, 1858)
160. Micronecta sedula Horváth, 1905
161. Micronecta semilaevis Horváth, 1899
162. Micronecta simillima Hutchinson, 1929
163. Micronecta sinuata Ha & Tran, 2021
164. Micronecta siva (Kirkaldy, 1897)
165. Micronecta skutalis Nieser & P.Chen, 1999
166. Micronecta solitaria Horváth, 1899
167. Micronecta spaniotricha Nieser et al., 2004
168. Micronecta spathula Poisson, 1952
169. Micronecta striata (Fieber, 1844)
170. Micronecta substriata Paiva, 1918
171. Micronecta sulcata (Signoret, 1860)
172. Micronecta taipeiensis L.Chen, 1960
173. Micronecta tantoui Poisson, 1960
174. Micronecta taprobanica Wróblewski, 1972
175. Micronecta tarsalis L.Chen, 1960
176. Micronecta tasmanica Wróblewski, 1977
177. Micronecta thelxinoe Kirkaldy, 1905
178. Micronecta thomasseti Jaczewski, 1927
179. Micronecta thyesta Distant, 1910
180. Micronecta transvaalensis Poisson, 1960
181. Micronecta transversa P.Chen, Nieser & Wattanachaiyingcharoen, 2002
182. Micronecta tuberculata Yang, 1966
183. Micronecta tuwanoni Nieser et al., 2004
184. Micronecta undulata Ha & Tran, 2021
185. Micronecta unguiculata Yang, 1967
186. Micronecta uvarovi Jaczewski, 1927
187. Micronecta vanduzeei Kirkaldy, 1905
188. Micronecta vidali Poisson, 1938
189. Micronecta vietnamica Ha & Tran, 2021
190. Micronecta virgata Hale, 1922
191. Micronecta waltoniana Hutchinson, 1940
192. Micronecta wau Linnavuori, 1971
193. Micronecta windi L.Chen, 1965
194. Micronecta winifreda Hutchinson, 1929
195. Micronecta wroblewskii J.Polhemus, 1979
196. Micronecta wui Lundblad, 1933
197. Micronecta youngiana Hutchinson, 1929
198. Micronecta yui L.Chen, 1960
