= Reformed Church of Fasor =

Church in Budapest, Hungary

Coordinates: 47.50760°N 19.07371°E

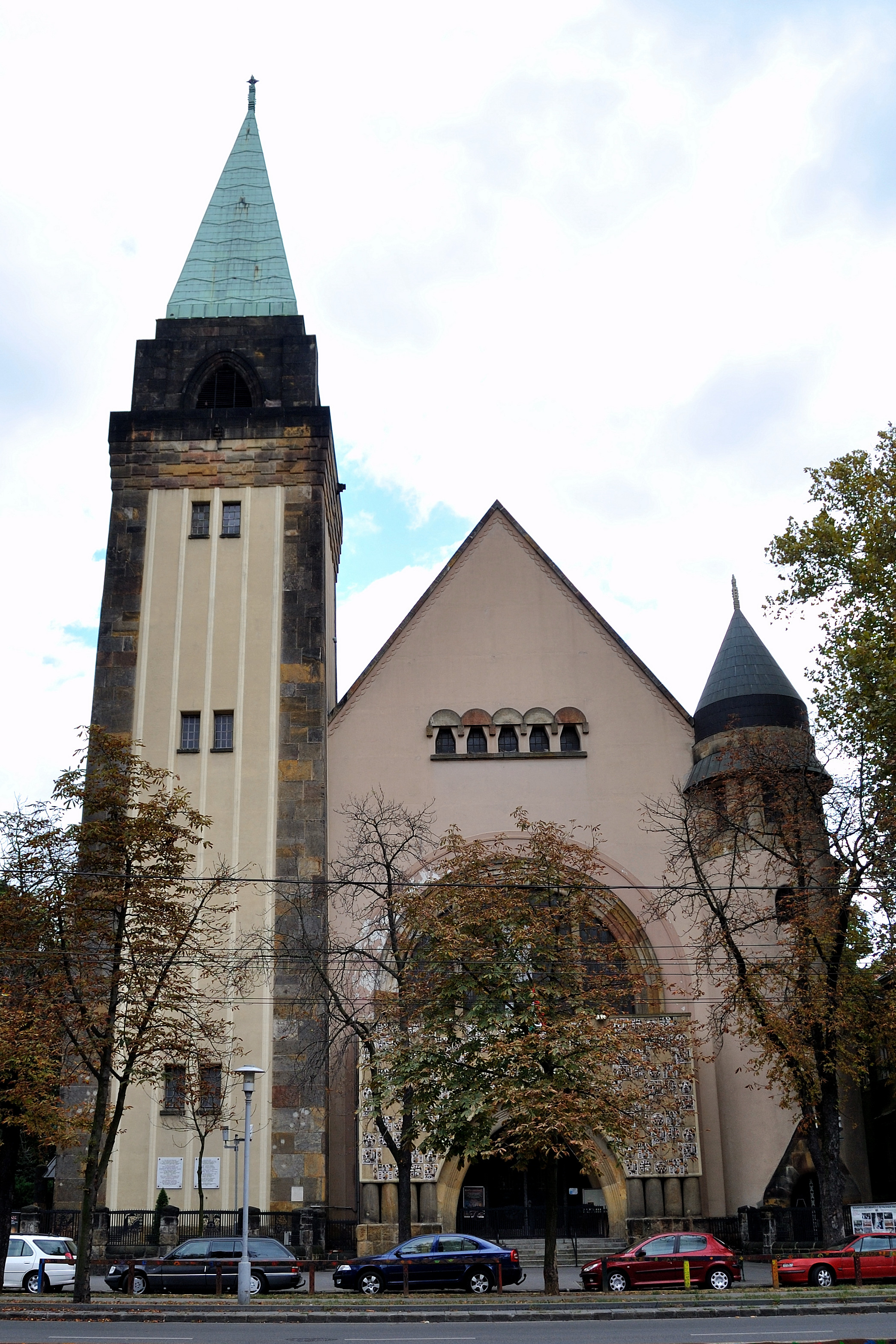
The church exterior

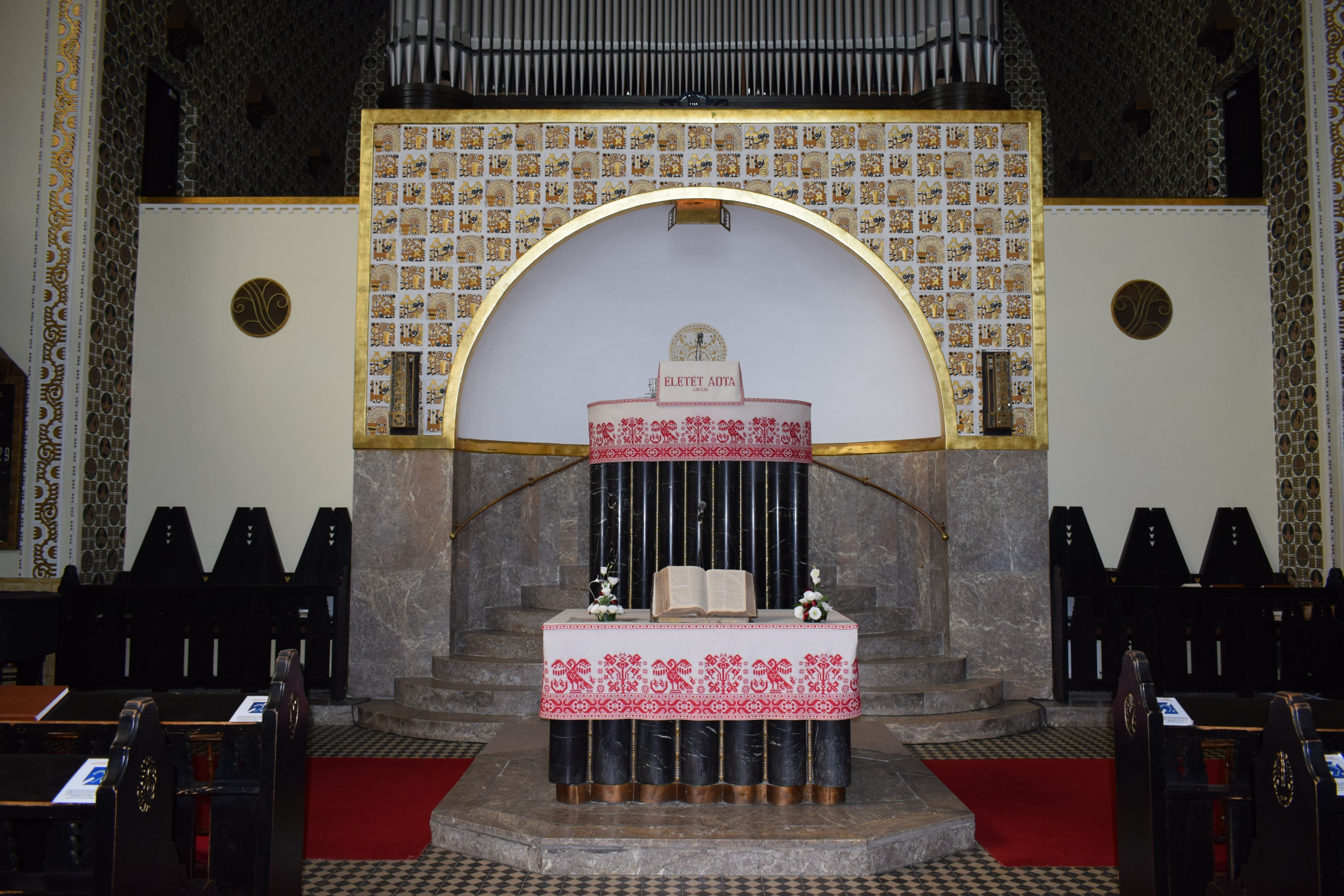
Pulpit and altar

The Reformed Church of Fasor or Fasor Reformed Church (Fasori református templom) is an Art Nouveau Protestant church in District VII of Budapest, designed by Aladár Árkay in 1910–1912. It is part of the Reformed Church in Hungary.

Most of the funds came from Adolf Laky earning him a bust in the church garden. The church has a facade covered in Zsolnay majolica tiles bearing designs that echo Hungarian folk art. Folk art motifs are repeated throughout the church. The stained glass windows were designed by Miksa Róth. The floor plan is in the shape of a Greek Cross, with galleries on three sides and an organ over the altar.
