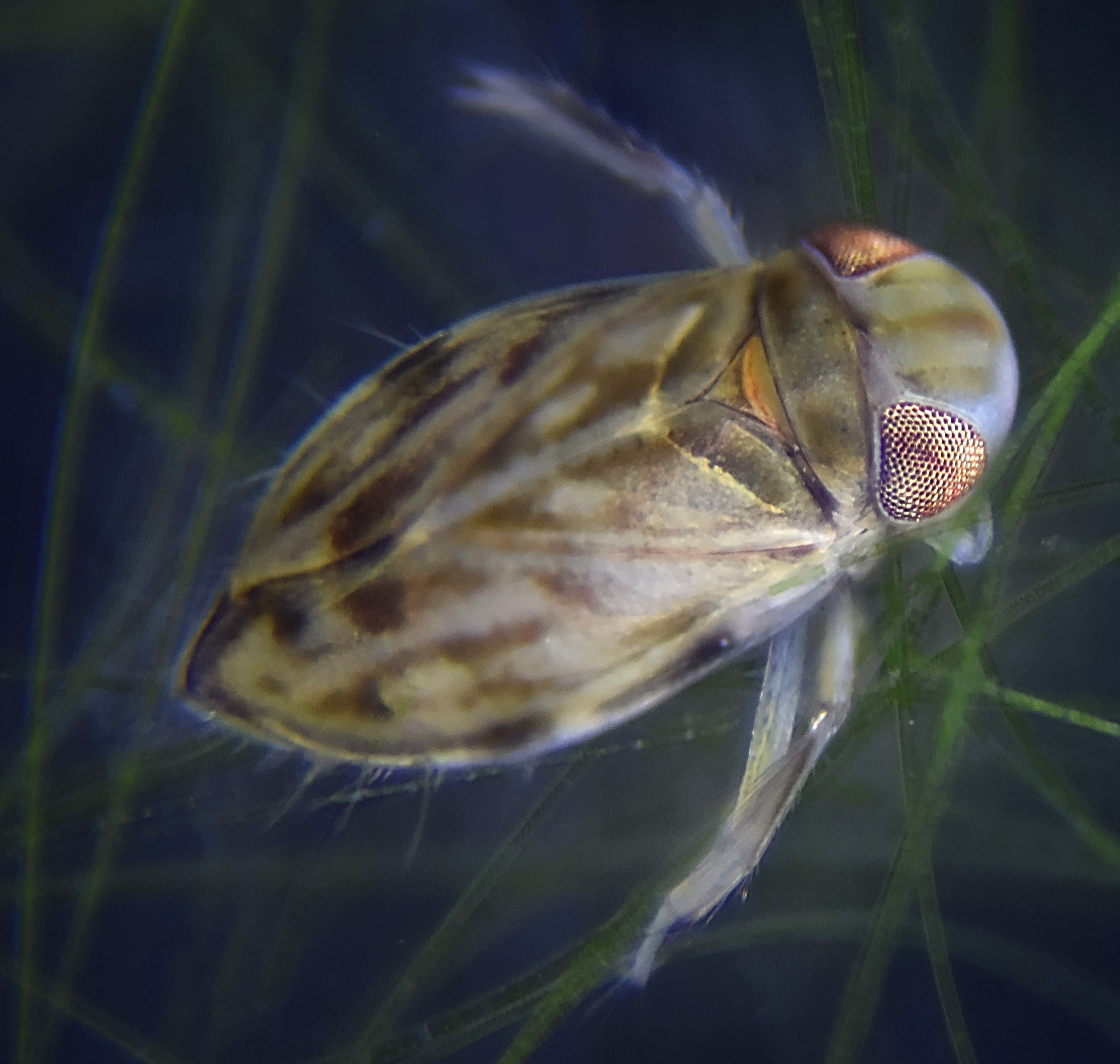
- Micronecta scholtzi

Scientific classification
- Domain: Eukaryota
- Kingdom: Animalia
- Phylum: Arthropoda
- Class: Insecta
- Order: Hemiptera
- Suborder: Heteroptera
- Infraorder: Nepomorpha
- Family: Micronectidae; Jaczewski, 1924

Subfamilies and generaa
- Micronectinae Jaczewski, 1924; Austronecta Tinerella, 2013; Micronecta Kirkaldy, 1897; Monogobia Nieser & P.P. Chen, 2006; Papuanecta Tinerella, 2008; Synaptonecta Lundblad, 1933; Tenagobia Bergroth, 1899; Synaptogobiinae Nieser & Chen, 2006; Synaptogobia Nieser & Chen, 2006

= Micronectidae =

Family of true bugs

Micronectidae is a family of water boatmen often referred to as pygmy water boatmen. They were originally classified as a subfamily under Corixidae but were raised to family level by Nieser (2002).

There are two subfamilies, Micronectinae with six genera and Synaptogobiinae with one genus.

== Subfamilies and genera ==
- Micronectinae
  - Austronecta Tinerella, 2013
  - Micronecta Kirkaldy, 1897
  - Monogobia Nieser & Chen, 2006
  - Papuanecta Tinerella, 2008
  - Synaptonecta Lundblad, 1933
  - Tenagobia Bergroth, 1899
- Synaptogobiinae
  - Synaptogobia Nieser & Chen, 2006

Data sources: i = ITIS, c = Catalogue of Life, g = GBIF, b = Bugguide.net
