= Čečejovce =

Municipality of Slovakia

Čečejovce Csécs
- Municipality
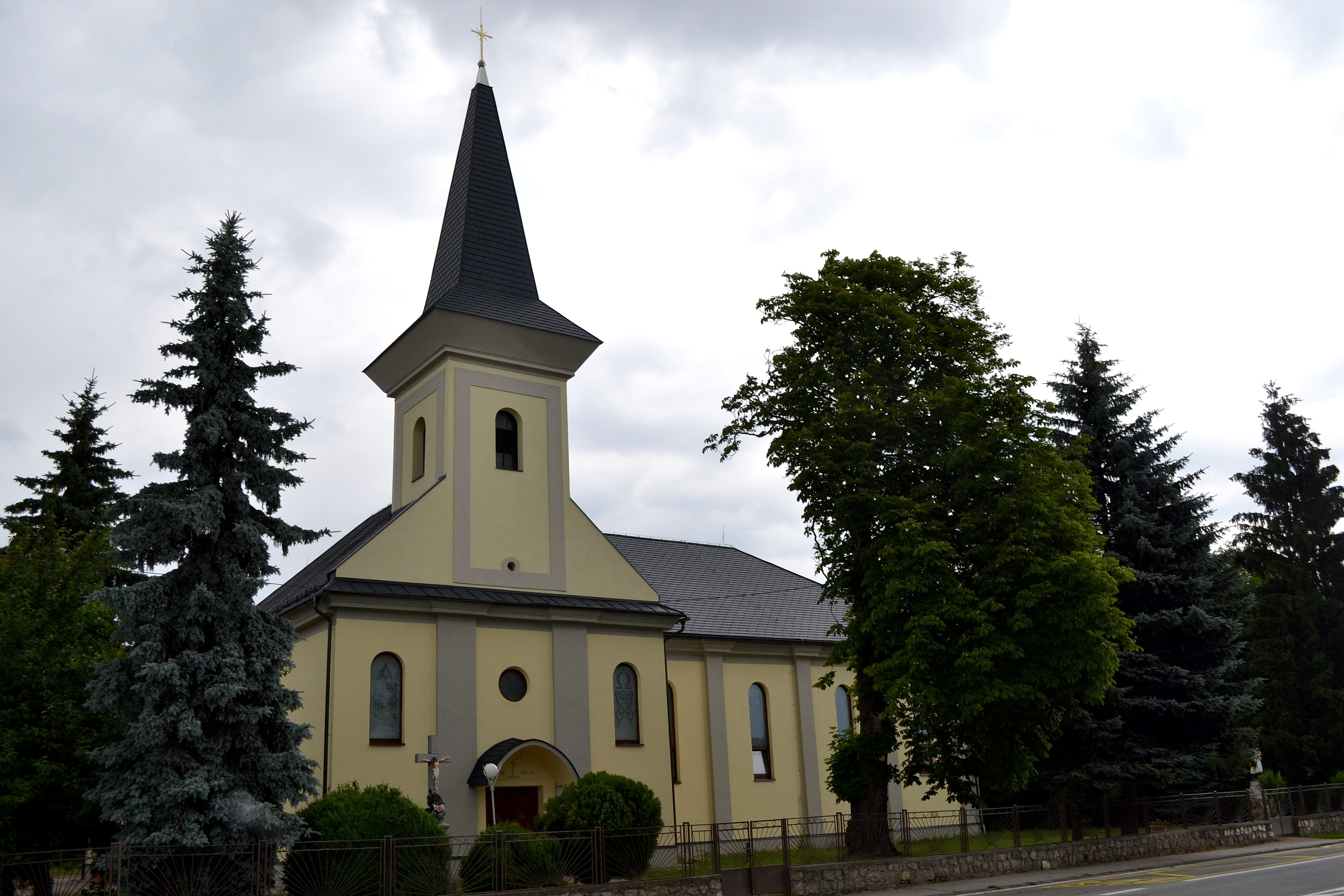
- Church of Saint John, the Apostle

- Flag

- Location of Čečejovce in the Košice Region Location of Čečejovce in Slovakia
- Coordinates: 48.60°N 21.07°E
- Country: Slovakia
- Region: Košice Region
- District: Košice-okolie District
- First mentioned: 1317

Area
  - Total: 24.52 km^{2} (9.47 sq mi)
- Elevation: 210 m (690 ft)

Population (2025)
  - Total: 2,129
- Time zone: UTC+1 (CET)
  - Summer (DST): UTC+2 (CEST)
- Postal code: 447 1
- Area code: +421 55
- Vehicle registration plate (until 2022): KS
- Website: www.cecejovce.sk

Čečejovce (Hungarian: Csécs) is a village and municipality in Košice-okolie District in the Košice Region of eastern Slovakia.

== History ==
The first written document of the village comes from the year 1317 where the settlement is named as "CECH". According to the tools made of stone 35 000 years B. C. and found in the territory of the village it can be made out, that the history of the village is much older and goes back as far as the Older Stone Age. The revealed foundations of ancient Neolithic settlements in various parts of the village's territory (the oldest comes from the period 5 000 years B. C.) prove the existence of numerous settlements with constructed dwellings already in the Stone Age when a considerable part of the territory was still covered by forests.

The Perényi's family was the first owner of the village known from the written document in 1402. Later, the Pédery and the Szirmay families are also named among the other possessors.

According to the records from 1427 the estimated number of inhabitants of the village was 350. Although the village itself wasn't occupied by Turks, it was almost completely unpopulated for fear of Turkish invasions. In 1715 there were only 4 families living here. After withdrawal of the Turks, the possessor of the village Szirmay let Hungarian families settle here. Afterwards Slovak, Polish, and Ruthenian settlers also came to the area.

The oldest building of the village, which stands on its place even today, is a stone church from the age of the Árpáds built in Early Gothic style with the elements of Roman style. The church, which was originally Roman Catholic, belongs to the Reformed Church since the time of Rákóczi's uprising in 1703.

A baroque manor house built in the middle of the 18th century stands close to the Catholic church. The facade of the manor house was remodeled in a neo-classical style at the beginning of the 19th century and is currently under reconstruction. Its main entrance gate from the 19th century has been preserved in its original form until now.

Opposite the manor house there is a Memorial of World War I and II with the names of war victims from the village written on the stone column. The St. Stefan's Crown on the top of the memorial has its own history. The pyramid shape Millennia Monument, which has a message for the next generations inside, is just opposite.

== Geography ==
The municipality lies at an altitude of 210 metres (690 ft) and covers an area of 24.52 km^{2} (9.47 sq mi) (2025).

== Population ==
Population statistic (10 years)
Year	1995	2005	2015	2025
Count	1875	1942	2131	2129
Difference		+3.57%	+9.73%	−0.09%

Population statistic
Year	2024	2025
Count	2119	2129
Difference		+0.47%

It has a population of 2129 people (31 December 2025).

=== Ethnicity ===
Census 2021 (1+ %)
Ethnicity	Number	Fraction
Slovak	1723	81.54%
Hungarian	567	26.83%
Not found out	114	5.39%
Total	2113	

In year 2021 was 2113 people by ethnicity 1723 as Slovak, 567 as Hungarian, 114 as Not found out, 20 as Romani, 7 as Rusyn, 6 as German, 5 as Czech, 4 as Russian, 3 as Ukrainian, 3 as Other, 2 as Croatian, 1 as Austrian and 1 as Polish.

Note on population: The difference values of population numbers in the table "Population statistic" and in the sections "Ethnicity" & "Religion" is caused by the use of various statistical methods.

=== Religion ===
Census 2021 (1+ %)
Religion	Number	Fraction
Roman Catholic Church	1482	70.14%
None	235	11.12%
Not found out	166	7.86%
Calvinist Church	121	5.73%
Greek Catholic Church	47	2.22%
Evangelical Church	26	1.23%
Total	2113	

In year 2021 was 2113 people by religion 1482 from Roman Catholic Church, 235 from None, 166 from Not found out, 121 from Calvinist Church, 47 from Greek Catholic Church, 26 from Evangelical Church, 8 from Apostolic Church, 6 from Ad hoc movements, 4 from Eastern Orthodox Church, 4 from Other, 3 from Paganism and natural spirituality, 3 from Other and not ascertained christian church, 2 from Jehovah's Witnesses, 2 from Christian Congregations in Slovakia, 2 from Seventh-day Adventist Church, 1 from Jewish community and 1 from Buddhism.

== Genealogical resources ==
The records for genealogical research are available at the state archive "Statny Archiv in Kosice, Slovakia"

- Roman Catholic church records (births/marriages/deaths): 1788-1897 (parish A)
- Greek Catholic church records (births/marriages/deaths): 1870-1902 (parish B)

== See also ==
- List of municipalities and towns in Slovakia
