= William Edward China =

English entomologist (1895–1979)

William Edward China CBE (7 December 1895 – 17 September 1979) was an English entomologist who specialized in Hemiptera, the true bugs. He served as Keeper of Entomology at the British Museum (Natural History) from 1955 to 1960.

China was born in London and educated at Cambridge. His education was interrupted by the First World War, during which he served in the army in France and then in the Royal Air Force. He obtained a degree in zoology from Cambridge after the war and then joined the British Museum (Natural History) in 1922. At this time, he took charge of the Hemipteran collections, in addition to the Orthoptera and Neuropterida collections. He obtained a D.Sc. from Cambridge University in 1948.

He later succeeded Norman Denbigh Riley as Keeper of Entomology in 1955. He specialized in Hemipteran systematics, publishing nearly 265 papers, describing 98 genera and nearly 248 species. During World War II, he contributed to the movement of specimens out of London. He retired in 1966 to Cornwall after working in part-retirement from 1960.
