= John Scott (entomologist) =

English entomologist (1823–1888)

John Scott (21 September 1823 – 30 August 1888) was an English entomologist. He was born, and died, in Morpeth. His collection of specimens is held at the Natural History Museum, London.
