= John William Douglas =

English entomologist

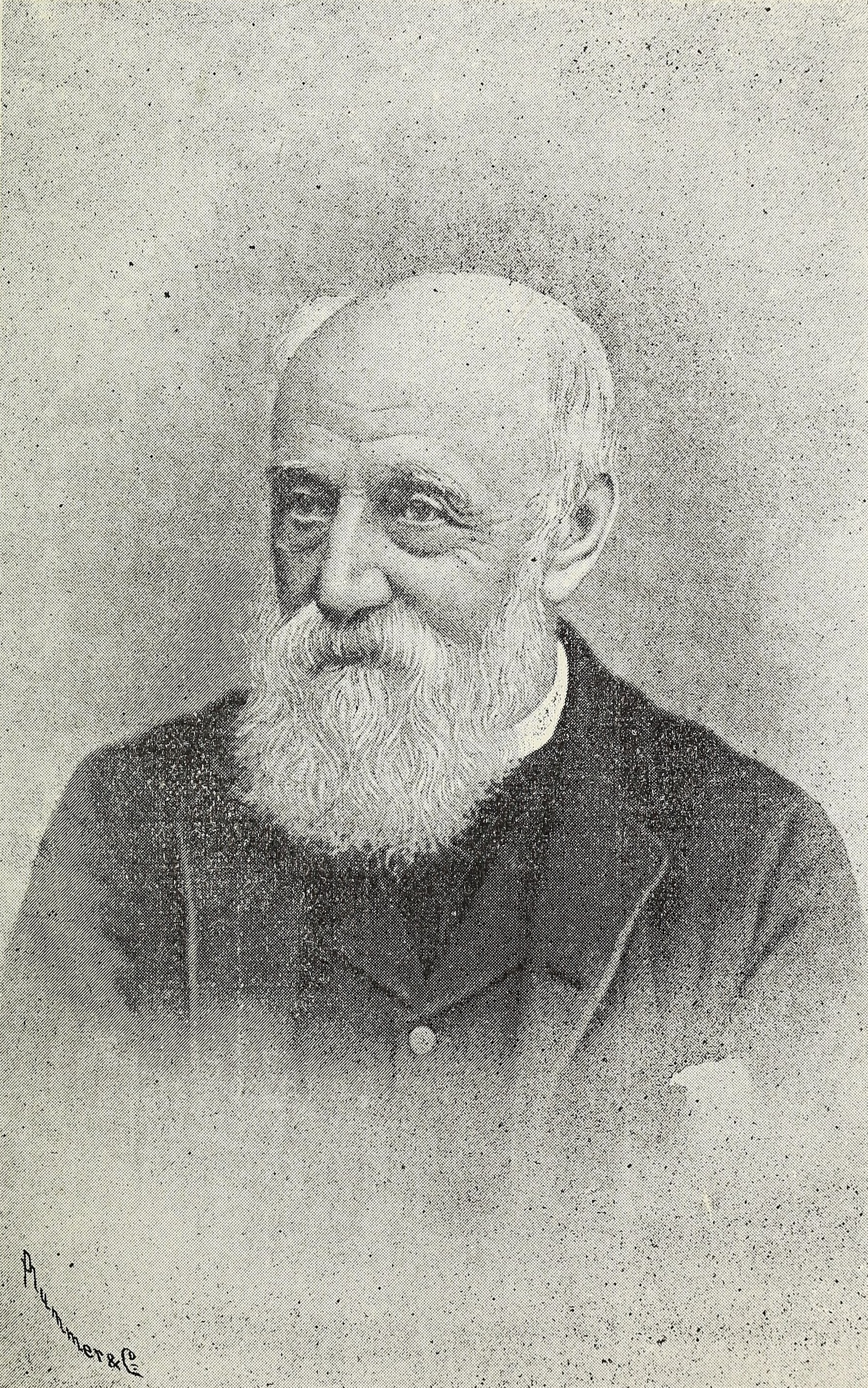
Portrait of John William Douglas, published in The British Naturalist

John William Douglas (15 November 1814 – 28 July 1905) was an English entomologist, chiefly interested in microlepidoptera. He was popularly known as "Jolly" Douglas for his ability to produce jocular doggerel in the style of Longfellow's Hiawatha.

== Biography ==
John William Douglas was born 1814 in Putney. His father came from Edinburgh. In a schoolboy prank gone wrong, a fellow student dropped a match into his pocket which contained crackers resulting in serious injury to his leg. Two years largely confined in bed forced him to take up botanical drawing and when he was able to walk again took up work at Kew as a botanical illustrator. He became interested in insects whilst working at Kew Gardens and published many papers and books on entomology. His most important work was The Natural History of the Tineina with the German Philipp Christoph Zeller, Englishman Henry Tibbats Stainton and a Swiss, Heinrich Frey. The Natural History of the Tineina appeared in English, French, German and Latin editions. Although his main interest was the Lepidoptera, Douglas was joint author of the work British Hemiptera Vol.1. Hemiptera-Heteroptera (1865). He was a president of the Royal Entomological Society (1860–61) and editor of The Entomologist's Monthly Magazine. Douglas was a keen promoter of entomology, especially among the young. He died in 1905 in Garlesden.

The entomologist Edward Newman incorporated into verse, Douglas the wise entomologist who lived in a place called Kingswood near Blackheath Station, in his The insect hunters (1857).

== Works ==
- The World of Insects. London, 1856.
- with John Scott. The British Hemiptera. (Vol. I, Ray. Soc. London, 1865)
- with HT Stainton, PC Zeller, JW Douglas and Frey, H The Natural History of the Tineina 13 volumes, 2000 pages English French, German and Latin editions.(text additions, synonymies and translations by Alexander Henry Haliday).1855-1873. Stainton, Henry Tibbats; Zeller, Philipp Christoph (1855). Vol. I.

=== Collections ===
John William Douglas' British Coleoptera and Hemiptera British Macrolepidoptera and Microlepidoptera are in the Natural History Museum, London.
