= Géza Horváth =

Hungarian entomologist (1847–1937)

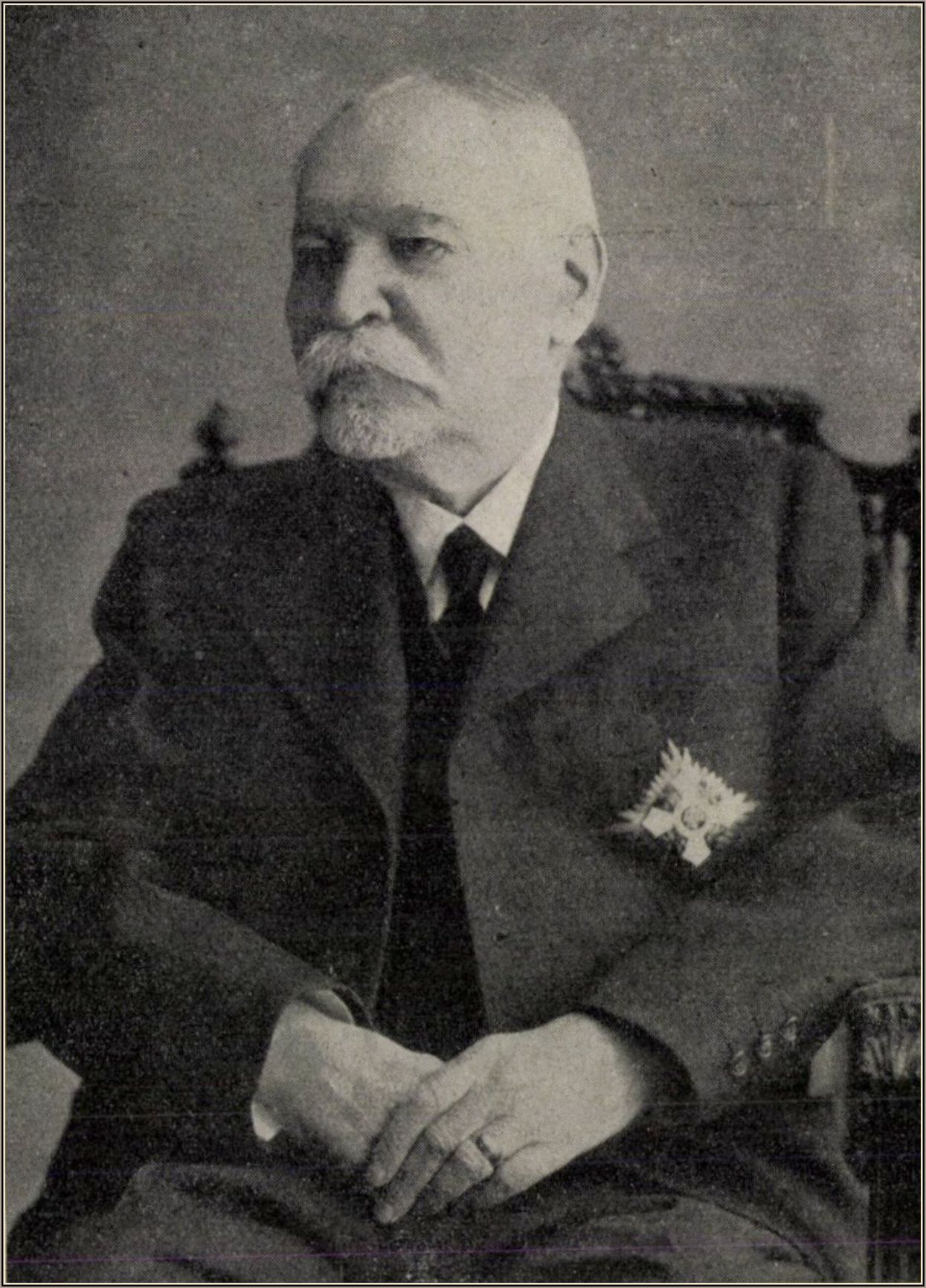
- Born: 23 November 1847; Csécs, Kingdom of Hungary (now Čečejovce, Slovakia)
- Died: 8 September 1937 (aged 89); Budapest, Kingdom of Hungary
- Scientific career
- Fields: Entomology

Géza Horváth (Hungarian pronunciation: [ˈhorvaːt ˈgeːzɒ]; 23 November 1847 – 8 September 1937) was a Hungarian medical doctor and entomologist internationally recognized for his work on bugs (Hemiptera). He also contributed extensively to the study of Hungarian scale insect fauna. He published over 350 papers in his lifetime.

== Biography ==
Horváth was born in Csécs, then a part of northern Hungary, and studied to the Kassa Gymnasium, where his teachers included Ludwig Heinrich Jeitteles. He then went to the University of Vienna and graduated in medicine. He returned to work at the Hungarian National Museum. He was made director of the newly established National Phylloxera Research Station in Budapest in 1880, where he did research on aphids, phylloxera, and psyllids along with others like Károly Sajó. He continued as director after being renamed to the State Entomological Station and broadened its focus to other kinds of noxious insects.

In 1896, he returned to the Hungarian National Museum, where he was director of its Zoology Department until he retired. He remained active in entomology after retirement, and was president of the 10th International Zoological Conference when Budapest hosted it in 1927 (his 80th year).

A species of lizard, Iberolacerta horvathi, is named in his honor. A species of millipede, Cylindroiulus horvathi, was named in his honor by Karl Wilhelm Verhoeff (1897:467).
