= Kamenica =

Kamenica (Cyrillic: Каменица) is a Slavic toponym, from the word kamen 'stone' and the suffix -ica. It may refer to:

== Albania ==
- Kamenica Tumulus (Tuma e Kamenicës), a Neolithic tumulus close to Kamenicë, Korçë
- Kamenicë, Korçë, a settlement in Korçë County
- Kamicë-Flakë (Kamenicë), a settlement in the Qendër municipality, Malësi e Madhe District, Shkodër County, northern Albania

== Bosnia and Herzegovina ==
=== Federation of Bosnia and Herzegovina ===
- Kamenica (Drvar), a settlement near Drvar
- Kamenica (Ilijaš), a settlement near Ilijaš
- Kamenica (Maglaj), a village in the municipality of Maglaj
- Kamenica (Vogošća), a settlement near Vogošća
- Kamenica (Zavidovići), a village near Zavidovići
- Kamenica, Konjic, village near Glavatičevo
- Kamenica (Krivaja), mountain stream on Konjuh, right tributary of the Krivaja

=== Republika Srpska ===
- Kamenica (Pale), a settlement near Pale
- Kamenica (Teslić), a village near Teslić
- Kamenica (Čelinac), a settlement near Čelinac
- Kamenica (Višegrad), a settlement near Višegrad
- Kamenica Donja, a settlement near Zvornik
- Kamenica Gornja, a settlement near Zvornik

== Bulgaria ==
- Kamenitsa (disambiguation)

== Croatia ==
- Kamenica, Varaždin County, a village near Lepoglava
- Kamenica, Zagreb County, a village near Preseka
- Kamenica, Koprivnica-Križevci County, a village near Sokolovac
- Kamenica Skradnička, a village near Tounj
- Križ Kamenica, a village near Brinje

== Germany ==
- Kamenz, a Lusatian town in eastern Saxony
- Chemnitz (from Sorbian: Kamjenica), the third-largest city in Saxony

== Kosovo ==
- Kamenica, Kosovo (Kamenicë), a town and municipality
- Kamenica, Leposavić, a village in Leposavić Municipality
- Kamenica, Zvečan, a village in Zvečan Municipality

== North Macedonia ==
- Makedonska Kamenica, a town and municipality

== Serbia ==
- Kamenica (Aleksinac), a village in the municipality of Aleksinac
- Kamenica (Bojnik), a village in the municipality of Bojnik
- Kamenica (Dimitrovgrad), a village in the municipality of Dimitrovgrad
- Kamenica (Gornji Milanovac), a village in the municipality of Gornji Milanovac
- Kamenica (Koceljeva), a village in the municipality of Koceljeva
- Kamenica (Kragujevac), a village in the municipality of Kragujevac
- Kamenica (Kraljevo), a village in Kraljevo municipality
- Kamenica (Loznica), a village in the municipality of Loznica
- Kamenica (Niš), a village in the city municipality of Pantelej, city of Niš
- Kamenica (Užice), a village in the municipality of Užice
- Kamenica (Valjevo), a village in the municipality of Valjevo
- Sremska Kamenica, a suburb of Novi Sad
- Mala Kamenica, a village in the municipality of Negotin
- Velika Kamenica, a village in the municipality of Kladovo
- Donja Kamenica, a village in the municipality of Knjaževac
- Gornja Kamenica, a village in the municipality of Knjaževac

== Slovakia ==
- Kamenica, a village in the Sabinov district in the Prešov Region
- Kamenica nad Cirochou, a village in the Humenné district in the Prešov Region
- Kamenica nad Hronom, a municipality and village in the Nitra Region
- Nižná Kamenica, a village and municipality in the Košice Region
- Vyšná Kamenica, a village and municipality in the Košice Region

== Slovenia ==
- Kamenica, Metlika, a village in the Municipality of Metlika, southeastern Slovenia
- Kamenica, Sevnica, a village in the Municipality of Sevnica, central Slovenia

== Other uses ==
- Kamenica (West Morava), a river in western Serbia, tributary of West Morava River
- Kamenica Church, a medieval Eastern Orthodox church in Donja Kamenica, Knjaževac Municipality
- Kasim Kamenica (born 1954), Bosnian Croatian handball coach and former handball player

== See also ==
- Kamenice (disambiguation)
- Kamenitsa (disambiguation)
- Kamenitza
- Kamenitza (Geomorphology) are closed depressions that develop on rock surfaces in karst regions formed by dissolution weathering.
- Kamienica (disambiguation)
- Kamenicky (disambiguation)
- Kamenica Sasa (disambiguation)
