= Kamenice =

Kamenice or Kamenicë may refer to:

== Municipalities and settlements ==
=== Albania ===
- Kamenicë, Korçë, a settlement in the Korçë Municipality, Korçë County
- Kamenicë, Fier, a settlement in the Divjakë Municipality, Fier County

=== Bosnia and Herzegovina ===
- Kamenice (Breza), a settlement in the municipality of Breza
- Kamenice (Jajce), a settlement in the municipality of Jajce

=== Czech Republic ===
- Kamenice (Jihlava District), a market town in the Vysočina Region
- Kamenice (Prague-East District), a municipality and village in the Central Bohemian Region
- Kamenice, a village and part of Březová (Sokolov District) in the Karlovy Vary Region
- Kamenice, a village and part of Dobré in the Hradec Králové Region
- Kamenice, a village and part of Dobšín in the Central Bohemian Region
- Kamenice, a village and part of Herálec (Havlíčkův Brod District) in the Vysočina Region
- Kamenice, a village and part of Klučenice in the Central Bohemian Region
- Kamenice, a village and part of Konecchlumí in the Hradec Králové Region
- Kamenice, a village and part of Nedrahovice in the Central Bohemian Region
- Kamenice, a village and part of Zákupy in the Liberec Region
- Kamenice nad Lipou, a town in the Vysočina Region
- Česká Kamenice, a town in the Ústí nad Labem Region
- Pustá Kamenice, a municipality and village in the Pardubice Region
- Srbská Kamenice, a municipality and village in the Ústí nad Labem Region
- Trhová Kamenice, a market town in the Pardubice Region

== Rivers ==
- Kamenice (Elbe), tributary of the Elbe river
- Kamenice (Jizera), tributary of the Jizera river
- Kamenice (Nežárka), tributary of the Nežárka river

== See also ==
- Kamenica (disambiguation)
- Chemnitz
