= Kamenitsa =

Kamenitsa (Bulgarian: Каменица, also transcribed as Kamenitza or Kamenica, from the word kamen – "stone" and the suffix -itsa) is the name of several locations in Bulgaria:

- Kamenitsa, Blagoevgrad Province, a village in Strumyani Municipality, in Blagoevgrad Province
- Kamenitsa, Sofia Province, a village in Mirkovo Municipality, in Sofia Province
- Kamenitsa Peak (Pirin) in the Pirin Mountains
- Kamenitsa Peak (Balkan Mountains) in the Balkan Mountains
- Kamenitsa (Vit), a river in northern Bulgaria, tributary of the Vit
- Kamenitsa (Rilska River), a river in western Bulgaria, tributary of Rilska River
- Kamenitsa (region), a region in western Bulgaria
- Kamenitsa Basin, a basin in western Bulgaria
- Kamenitsa (neighbourhood), a residential neighbourhood of Plovdiv
- the former village of Kamenitsa, today a part of Velingrad
- Kamenitsa (village), a small village in Peloponnese, Arcadia, Greece

== See also ==
- Kamenitza
- Kamenitza (Geomorphology) are closed depressions that develop on rock surfaces in karst regions formed by dissolution weathering.
- Kamenica (disambiguation)
- Kamenicky (disambiguation)
