= Kamienica =

Kamienica may refer to:

- Kamienica (architecture), a type of tenement building especially prevalent in Poland
- Kamienica (river), a river in south-western Poland
- Kamienica, Kłodzko County in Lower Silesian Voivodeship (south-west Poland)
- Kamienica, Jawor County in Lower Silesian Voivodeship (south-west Poland)
- Kamienica, Gmina Dobrzyń nad Wisłą in Kuyavian-Pomeranian Voivodeship (north-central Poland)
- Kamienica, Tuchola County in Kuyavian-Pomeranian Voivodeship (north-central Poland)
- Kamienica, Gmina Skępe in Kuyavian-Pomeranian Voivodeship (north-central Poland)
- Kamienica, Podlaskie Voivodeship (north-east Poland)
- Kamienica, Pomeranian Voivodeship (north Poland)
- Kamienica, Bytów County in Pomeranian Voivodeship
- Kamienica, Limanowa County in Lesser Poland Voivodeship (south Poland)
- Kamienica, Miechów County in Lesser Poland Voivodeship (south Poland)
- Kamienica, Masovian Voivodeship (east-central Poland)
- Kamienica, Konin County in Greater Poland Voivodeship (west-central Poland)
- Kamienica, Wągrowiec County in Greater Poland Voivodeship (west-central Poland)
- Kamienica, Silesian Voivodeship (south Poland)
- Kamienica, Opole Voivodeship (south-west Poland)
- Kamienica, Bielsko-Biała (district of Bielsko-Biała, south Poland)

== See also ==
- Kamenica (disambiguation)
- Kamenitsa (disambiguation)
- Kamenitza
- Kamenicky (disambiguation)
