= Kamenica Sasa =

Kamenica Sasa may also refer to:

- ŽFK Kamenica Sasa, a Macedonian women's association football club
- FK Sasa, a Macedonian men's association football club

== See also ==
- Kamenica (disambiguation)
