= Mollaj =

- Administrative unit
- Location within Albania
- Coordinates: 40°34′N 20°44′E
- Country: Albania
- County: Korçë
- Municipality: Korçë

Population (2011)
  - Administrative unit: 3,438
- Time zone: UTC+1 (CET)
  - Summer (DST): UTC+2 (CEST)
- Postal Code: 7017
- Area Code: (0)863

Mollaj is a village and a former municipality in the Korçë County, southeastern Albania. At the 2015 local government reformed it became a subdivision of the municipality Korçë. The population at the 2011 census was 3,438. The municipal unit consists of the villages Mollaj, Floq, Pulahë, Ujë Bardhë and Kamenicë.
