= Mirkovo =

Mirkovo Мирково
- Location of Mirkovo
- Coordinates: 42°42′N 23°59′E
- Country: Bulgaria
- Provinces (Oblast): Sofia

Government
  - Mayor: Tsvetanka Yotina
- Elevation: 715 m (2,346 ft)

Population (2008)
  - Total: 1,700
- Time zone: UTC+2 (EET)
  - Summer (DST): UTC+3 (EEST)
- Postal Code: 2086
- Area code: 07182

Mirkovo (Bulgarian: Мирково, pronounced [ˈmirkovo]) is a village in western Bulgaria, part of Sofia Province. It is the administrative centre of Mirkovo Municipality, which lies in the central eastern part of Sofia Province. The village is located in the eastern part of the Zlatitsa–Pirdop Valley, 63 kilometres east of the capital Sofia, at the southern foot of the 1,787-metre Etropolska Baba Peak in the Etropole part of the Balkan Mountains.

The surrounding area has been inhabited since the Neolithic, with the Thracians and Romans populating it in Antiquity and the Slavs and Bulgars in the Middle Ages, when it was part of the First Bulgarian Empire and Second Bulgarian Empire. The village itself, however, was first mentioned in Ottoman registers in 1430 and 1751 as Mirkuva; the name is thought to originate from the South Slavic personal name Mirko with the placename suffix -ovo. A monastical school was established in 1825, during the Bulgarian National Revival, and the locals took an active part in the Liberation of Bulgaria, participating in hajduk bands and assisting the Russian forces as opalchentsi in the Russo-Turkish War of 1877-78. The village Bulgarian Orthodox church of Saint Greatmartyr Demetrius was built in 1834 by the masters Minko and Delo.

The village of Mirkovo bears traces of ancient settlements. In the "Mogila" area, 3.5 km south of Mirkovo, remains of a Neolithic settlement have been discovered. In the areas of "Deninata Plocha," "Ortova," "Usta," "Yalamovoto Tepe," and "Hriskovata Plocha," remnants of Thracian settlements have been found. The "Aramudere" area within the village's territory conceals a tomb from Roman times. Near the village, in the "Taushanitsa" locality, an early Christian sanctuary is located. Valuable medieval monuments have also been uncovered near Mirkovo, including the church of "St. George" from the 12th-13th century, as well as remnants of a fortress guarding the pass to Etropole in the "Gradishte" area.

The earliest mentions of the village of Mirkovo (or Mirkova) are found in Ottoman records from 1430 and 1751.

In 1825, during the Bulgarian Revival, a kiln school was established in the village. Residents of Mirkovo participated in the squads of Panayot Hitov, Hristo Botev, and Georgi Benkovski. Thirty-eight people from Mirkovo joined the Russo-Turkish Liberation War.

In 1878, Ivan Radov Maslev opened the first brewery in Bulgaria in the village, and in 1883, the factory was relocated to Sofia on "Solni Pazar."

In 1884, the "Mirkovo Scientific Society 'Iskra'" was founded, and in 1908, the "Prosveta" community center was established. In 1909, they merged into the "Hristo Botev" community center.

In 1890, Todor Vlaykov and Todor Yonchev founded the first Bulgarian cooperative in Mirkovo – the Mirkovo Credit, Savings, and Agricultural Society "Oralo"; in 1914, the "Pchela" credit cooperative was established as the successor to "Oralo."

== Gallery ==
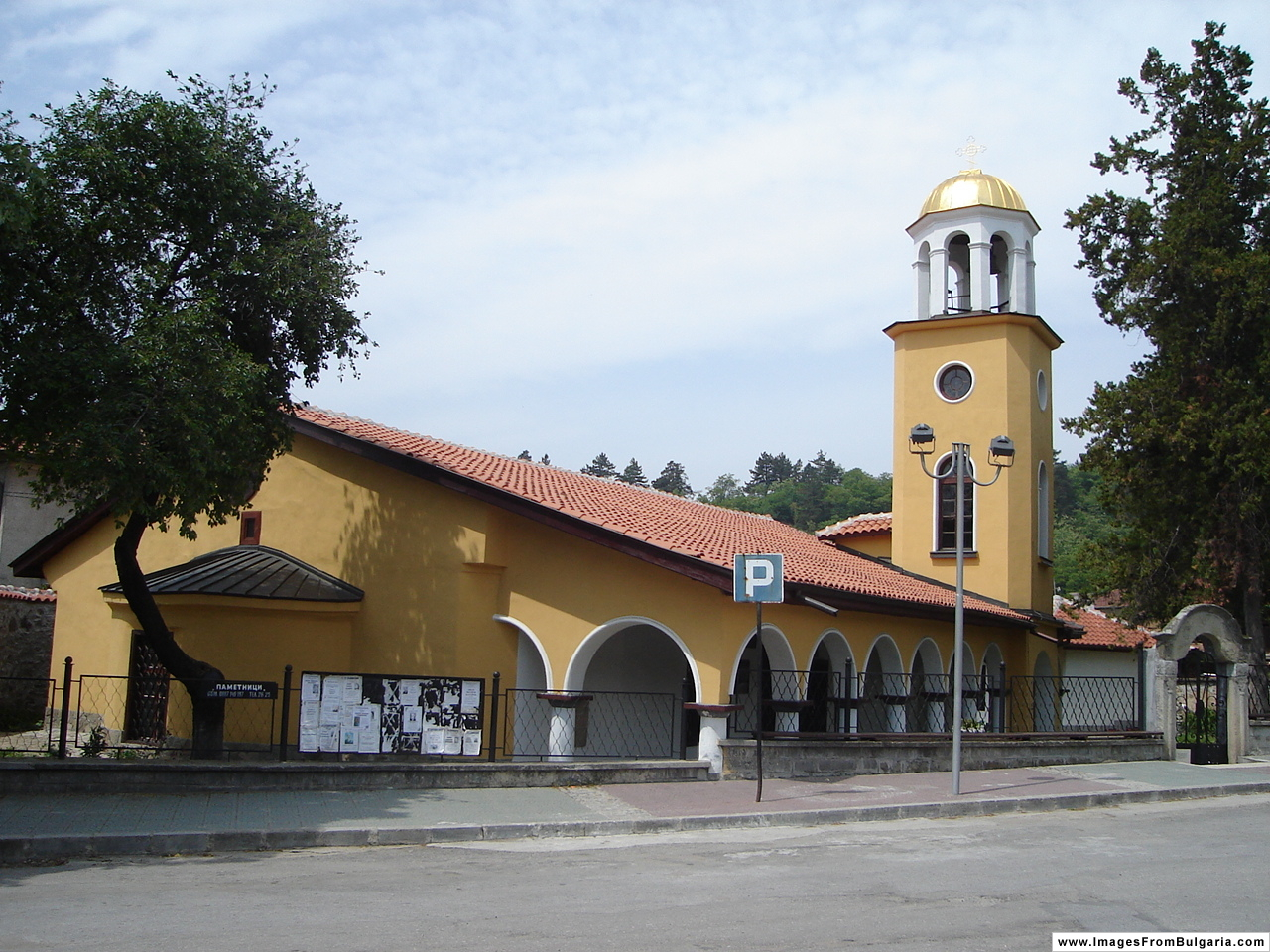
Church of Saint Greatmartyr Demetrius (1834)

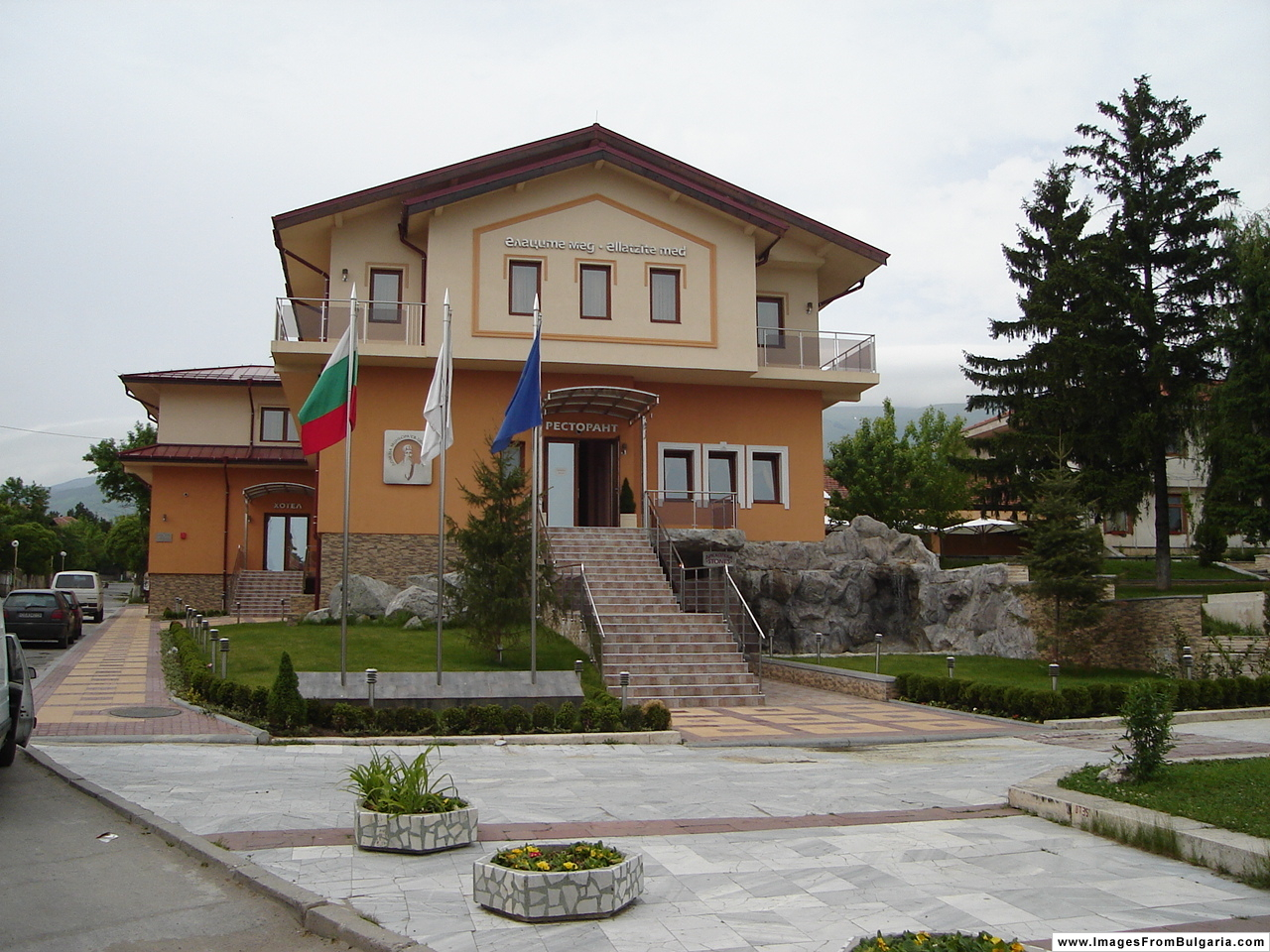
Hotel in the village centre

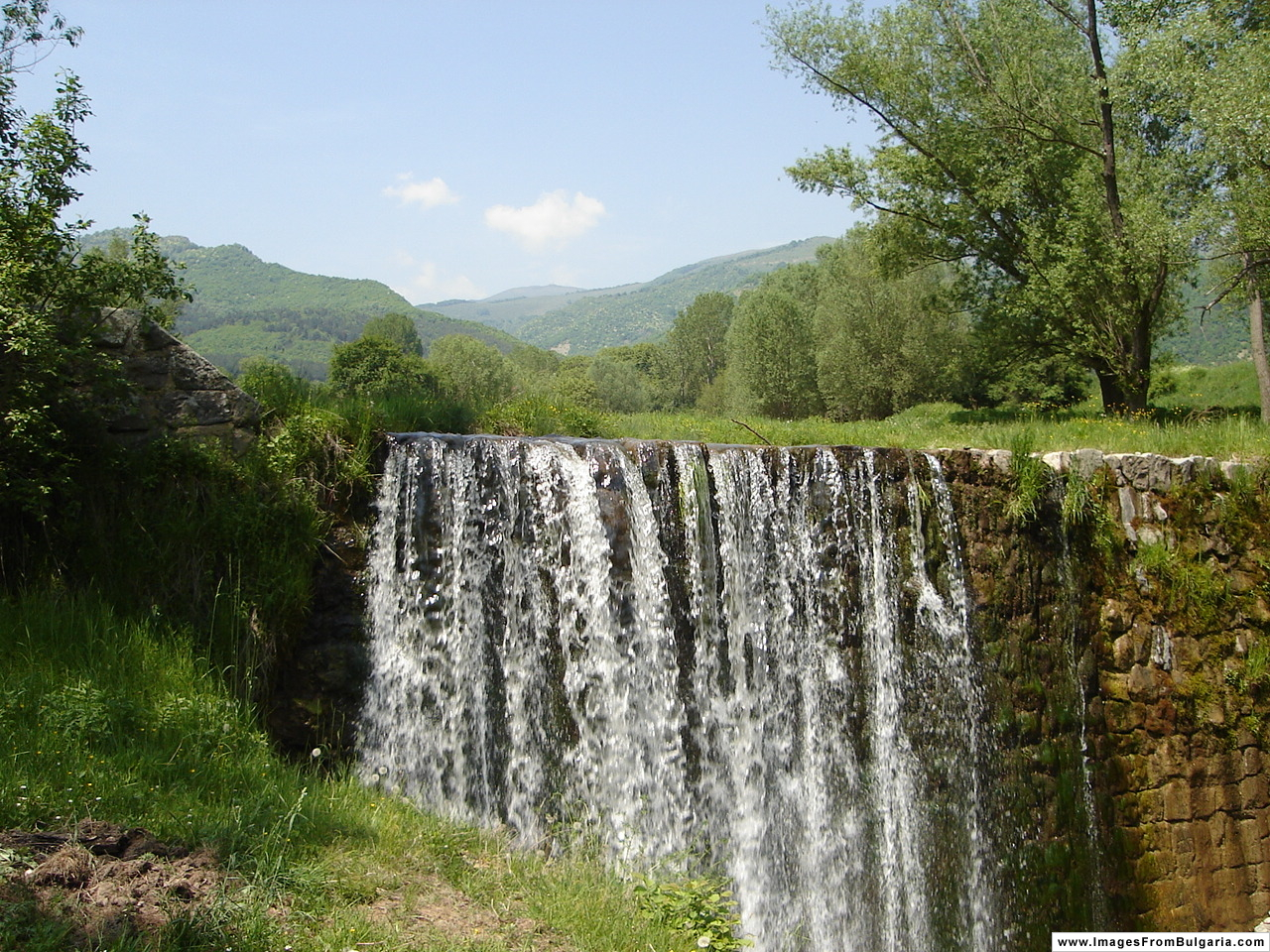
Small waterfall

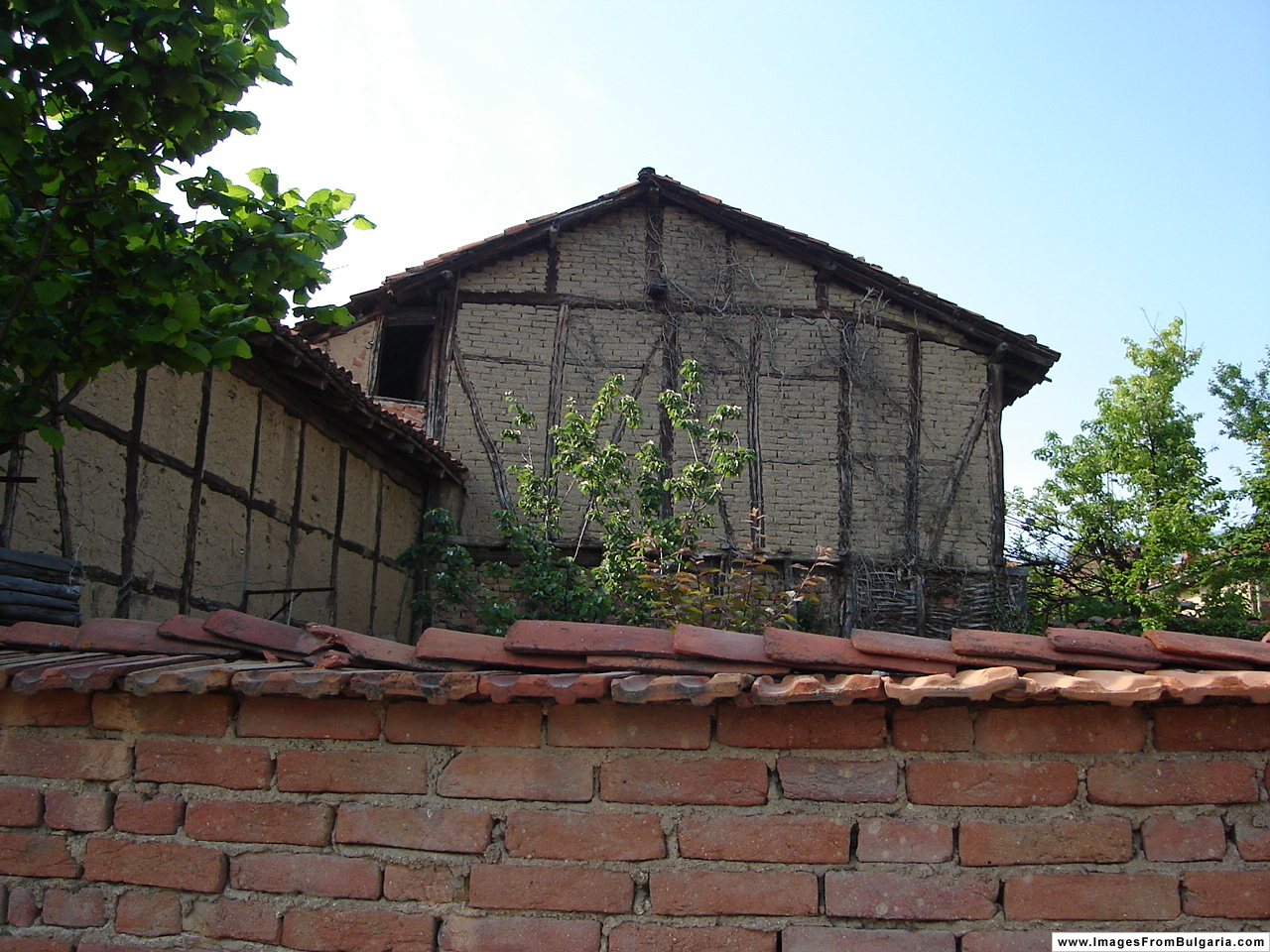
Old timber-framed farm buildings
