= Vyšná Kamenica =

Village and municipality in Slovakia

Vyšná Kamenica Felsőkemence
- Municipality
- Flag

- Location of Vyšná Kamenica in the Košice Region Location of Vyšná Kamenica in Slovakia
- Coordinates: 48.78°N 21.48°E
- Country: Slovakia
- Region: Košice Region
- District: Košice-okolie District
- First mentioned: 1427

Area
  - Total: 11.33 km^{2} (4.37 sq mi)
- Elevation: 354 m (1,161 ft)

Population (2025)
  - Total: 408
- Time zone: UTC+1 (CET)
  - Summer (DST): UTC+2 (CEST)
- Postal code: 444 6
- Area code: +421 55
- Vehicle registration plate (until 2022): KS
- Website: www.vysnakamenica.sk

Vyšná Kamenica (Hungarian: Felsőkemence) is a village and municipality in Košice-okolie District in the Kosice Region of eastern Slovakia.

== History ==
In historical records the village was first mentioned in 1427.

== Geography ==
The municipality lies at an altitude of 354 metres (1,161 ft) and covers an area of 11.33 km^{2} (4.37 sq mi) (2025).

== Transport ==
The nearest railway station is at Ruskov.

== Population ==
Population statistic (10 years)
Year	1995	2005	2015	2025
Count	227	253	276	408
Difference		+11.45%	+9.09%	+47.82%

Population statistic
Year	2024	2025
Count	393	408
Difference		+3.81%

It has a population of 408 people (31 December 2025).

=== Ethnicity ===
Census 2021 (1+ %)
Ethnicity	Number	Fraction
Slovak	327	98.79%
Hungarian	5	1.51%
Czech	4	1.2%
Total	331	

In year 2021 was 331 people by ethnicity 327 as Slovak, 5 as Hungarian, 4 as Czech, 2 as Not found out, 1 as Ukrainian, 1 as Romani, 1 as Rusyn and 1 as Moravian.

Note on population: The difference values of population numbers in the table "Population statistic" and in the sections "Ethnicity" & "Religion" is caused by the use of various statistical methods.

=== Religion ===
Census 2021 (1+ %)
Religion	Number	Fraction
Evangelical Church	150	45.32%
Roman Catholic Church	103	31.12%
None	49	14.8%
Greek Catholic Church	18	5.44%
Calvinist Church	7	2.11%
Total	331	

In year 2021 was 331 people by religion 150 from Evangelical Church, 103 from Roman Catholic Church, 49 from None, 18 from Greek Catholic Church, 7 from Calvinist Church, 2 from Not found out and 2 from Other.
