= Kamenica (Užice) =

Coordinates: 43°53′25″N 19°55′02″E

- Village
- Interactive map of Kamenica
- Country: Serbia

Population (2022)
  - Total: 174
- Time zone: UTC+1 (CET)
  - Summer (DST): UTC+2 (CEST)

Kamenica (Serbian Cyrillic: Каменица) is a village located in the Užice municipality of Serbia. According to the 2022 census, the village has a population of 174 people. In the 2011 census, the village had a population of 220.
