= Dobšín =

- Municipality
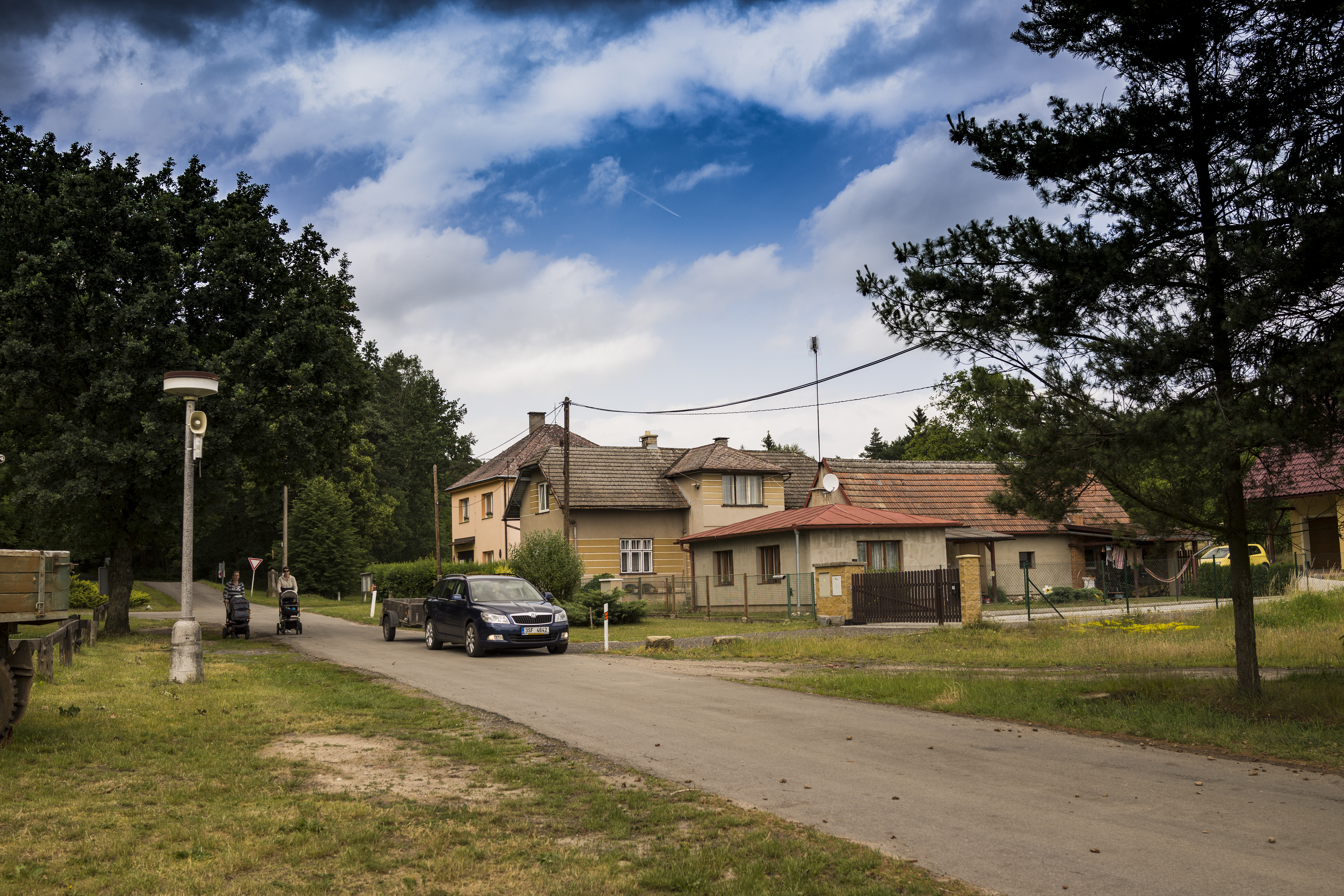
- A street in Dobšín

- Flag Coat of arms

- Location in the Czech Republic
- Coordinates: 50°29′0″N 15°7′0″E
- Country: Czech Republic
- Region: Central Bohemian
- District: Mladá Boleslav
- First mentioned: 1556

Area
  - Total: 3.54 km^{2} (1.37 sq mi)
- Elevation: 315 m (1,033 ft)

Population (2026-01-01)
  - Total: 310
  - Density: 88/km^{2} (230/sq mi)
- Time zone: UTC+1 (CET)
  - Summer (DST): UTC+2 (CEST)
- Postal code: 294 04
- Website: dobsin.cz

Dobšín is a municipality and village in Mladá Boleslav District in the Central Bohemian Region of the Czech Republic. It has about 300 inhabitants.

== Administrative division ==
Dobšín consists of two municipal parts (in brackets population according to the 2021 census):

- Dobšín (107)
- Kamenice (178)

== Demographics ==
Historical population
Year	Pop.	±%
1869	336	—
1880	366	+8.9%
1890	331	−9.6%
1900	330	−0.3%
1910	318	−3.6%
1921	300	−5.7%
1930	287	−4.3%
1950	224	−22.0%
1961	258	+15.2%
1970	232	−10.1%
1980	225	−3.0%
1991	206	−8.4%
2001	209	+1.5%
2011	228	+9.1%
2021	285	+25.0%
Source: Censuses
