= Mirkovo Municipality =

Coordinates: 42°42′0″N 23°58′59″E

Mirkovo Municipality Община Мирково
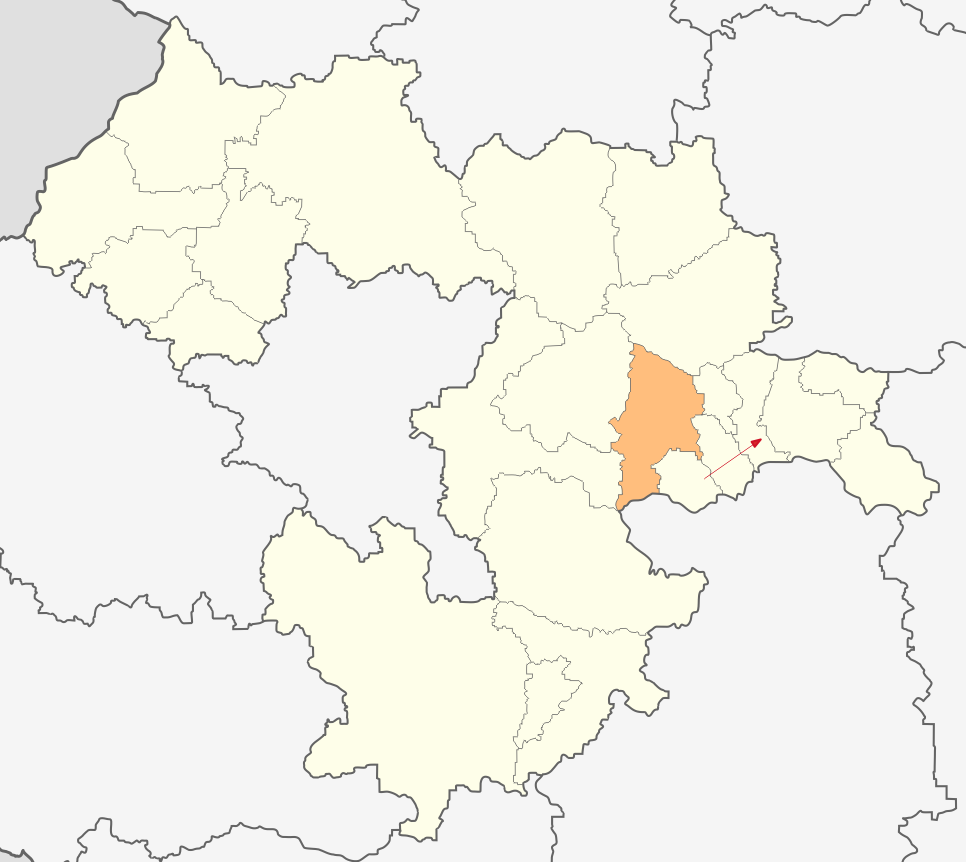
- Country: Bulgaria
- Province: Sofia Province
- Seat: Mirkovo

Area
  - Total: 207.9 km^{2} (80.3 sq mi)

Population (2024)
  - Total: 2,188
  - Density: 10.52/km^{2} (27.26/sq mi)
- Website: www.mirkovo.bg

Mirkovo Municipality (Bulgarian: Община Мирково) is a municipality in Sofia Province, central western Bulgaria. Covering a territory of 207.9 km^{2}, it is the 13th largest of the 22 municipalities in the province and takes 2.94% of its total area.

== Geography ==
The relief of the municipality is varied. To the north lies the main ridge of the Balkan Mountains. In the central part are the westernmost reaches of the Zlatitsa–Pirdop Valley, part of the chain of the eleven Sub-Balkan valleys. To the south are the northern slopes of the Sredna Gora mountain range. The highest point of the municipality is a summit of Mara Gidia (1,790 m) in the Balkan Mountains.

The municipality is drained by several right tributaries of the river Topolnitsa, a left tributary of the Maritsa of the Aegean Sea basin.

== Transport ==
Mirkovo Municipality is traversed by three roads of the national network with a total length of 28.5 km: a 16.3 km section of the first class I-6 road Gyueshevo–Sofia–Karlovo–Burgas, a 7.8 km stretch of the third class III-6004 road, and the first 4.4 km of the third class III-6006 road. A 14.3 km section of railway line No. 3 Sofia–Karlovo–Sliven–Karnobat–Varna runs through the municipality.

== Demography ==
Historical population
Year	Pop.	±%
1934	6,916	—
1946	6,977	+0.9%
1956	6,199	−11.2%
1965	5,453	−12.0%
1975	4,847	−11.1%
1985	4,106	−15.3%
1992	3,534	−13.9%
2001	3,179	−10.0%
2011	2,540	−20.1%
2021	2,339	−7.9%
Source: National Statistics Institute

As of 2024 the population of Mirkovo Municipality is 2,188, spread in 11 villages:

- Benkovski
- Brestaka
- Bunovo
- Ilinden
- Kamenitsa
- Mirkovo
- Plazishte
- Prespa
- Smolsko
- Hvarchil
- Cherkovishte

== Gallery ==
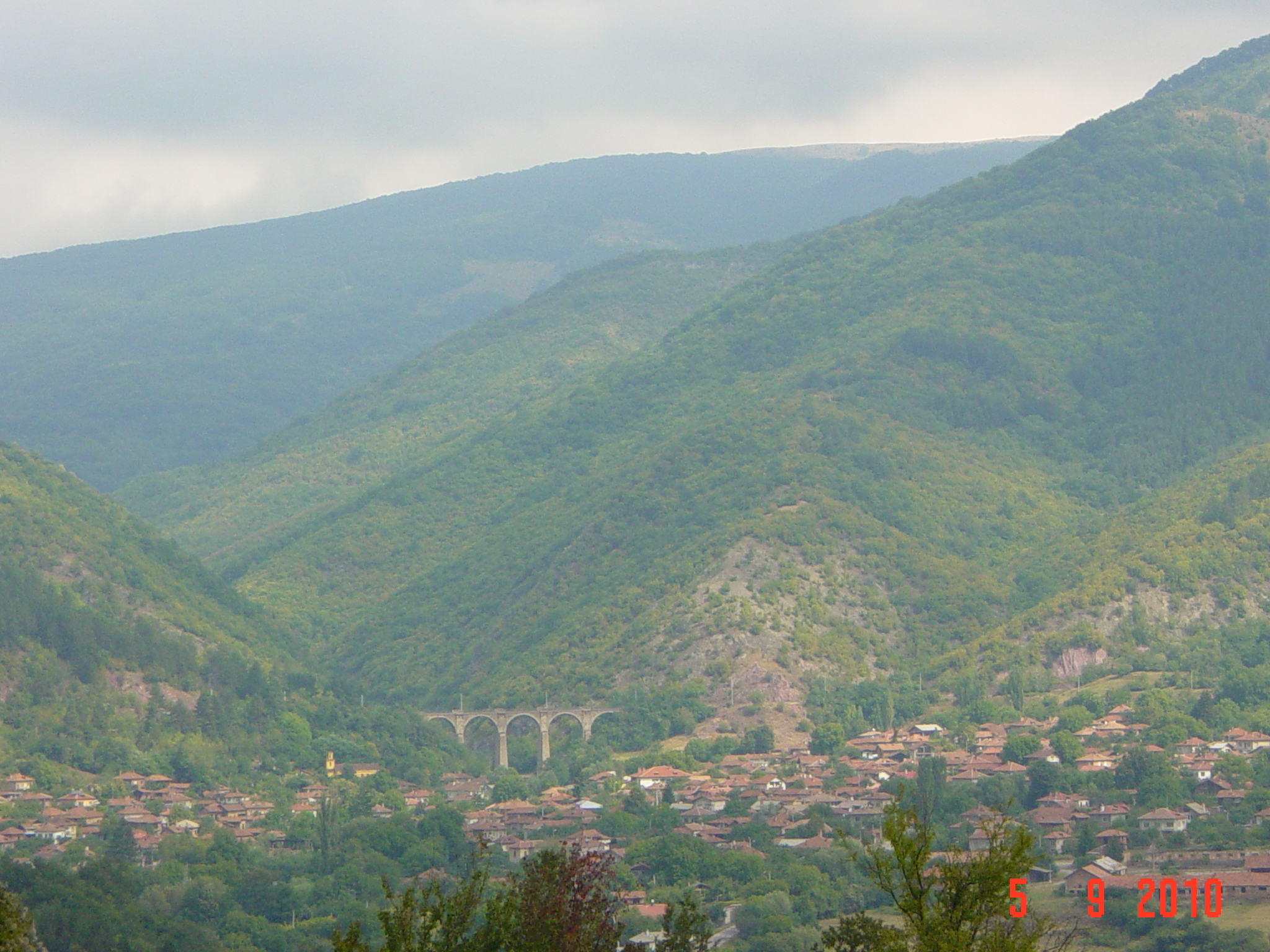
A view of Bunovo

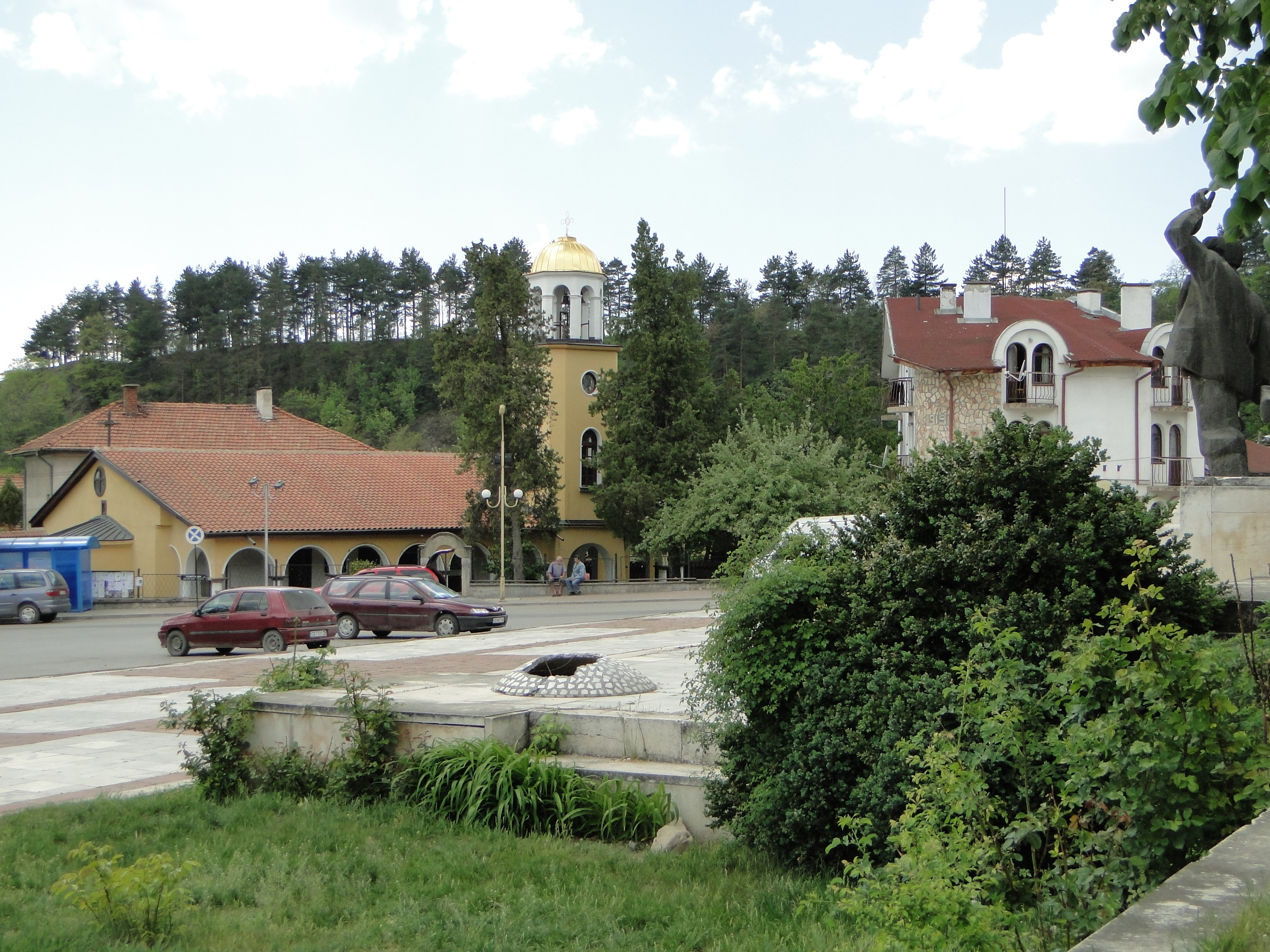
Mirkovo

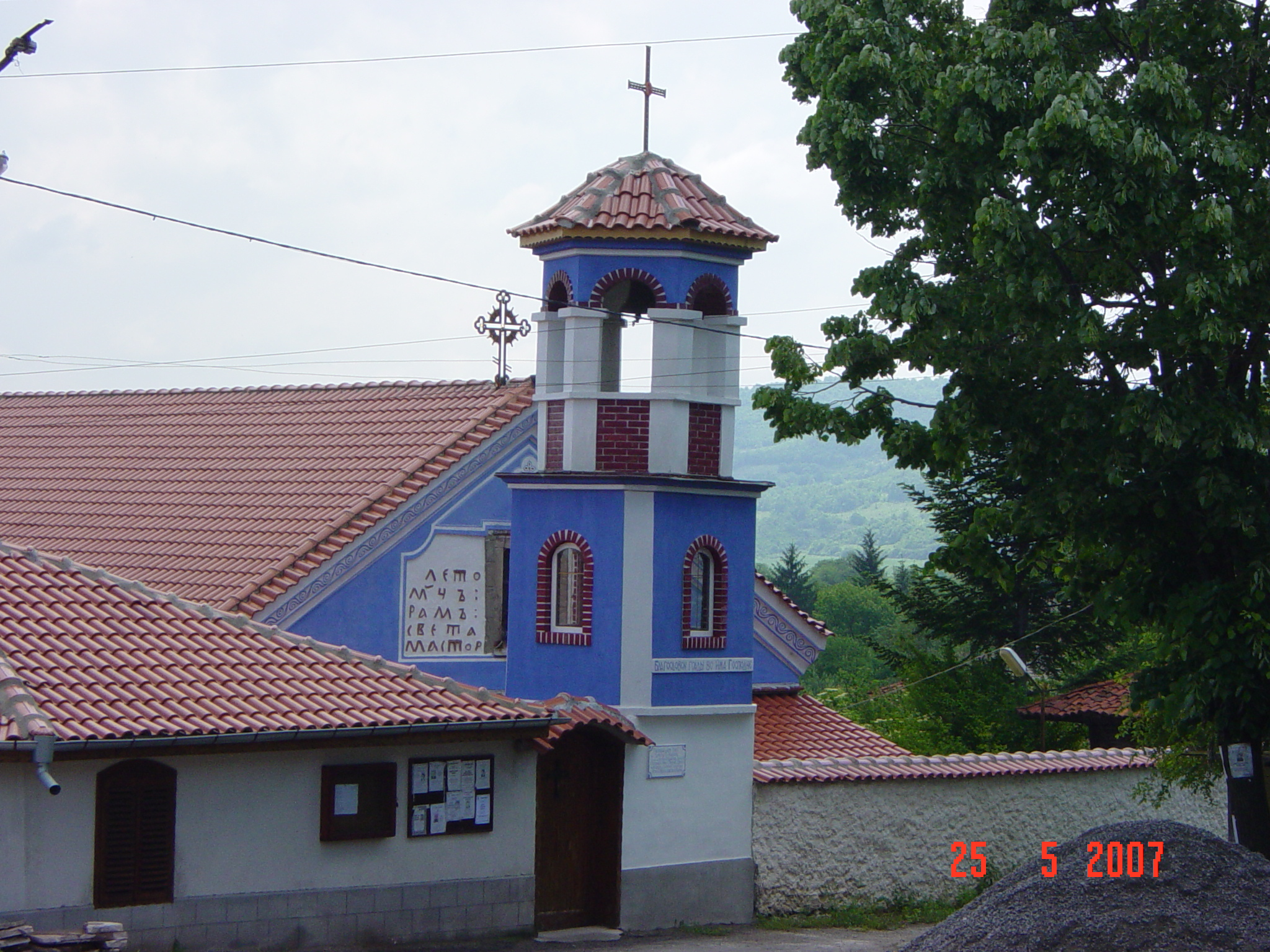
A church in Smolsko

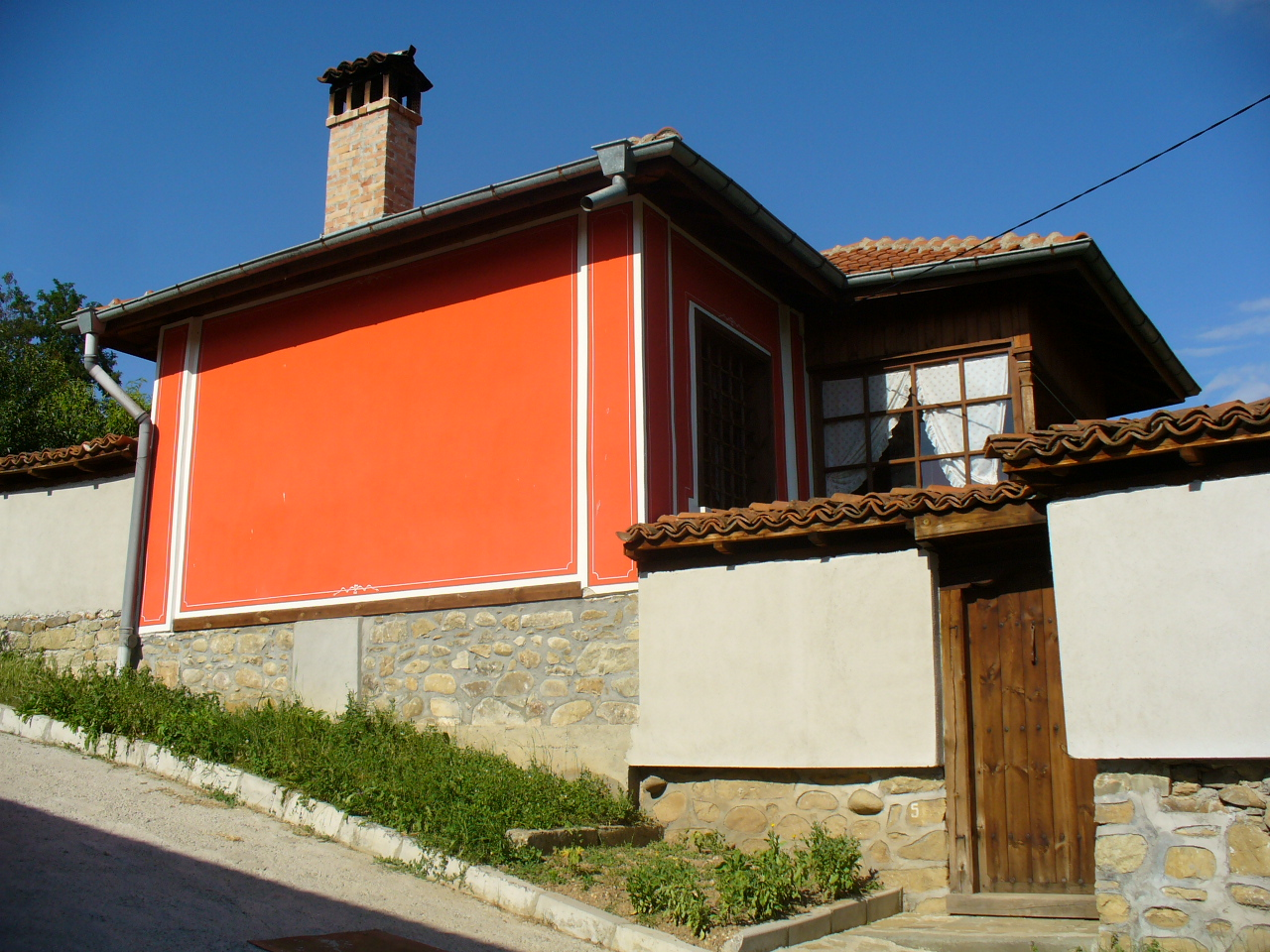
A house in Benkovski
