= Konecchlumí =

- Municipality
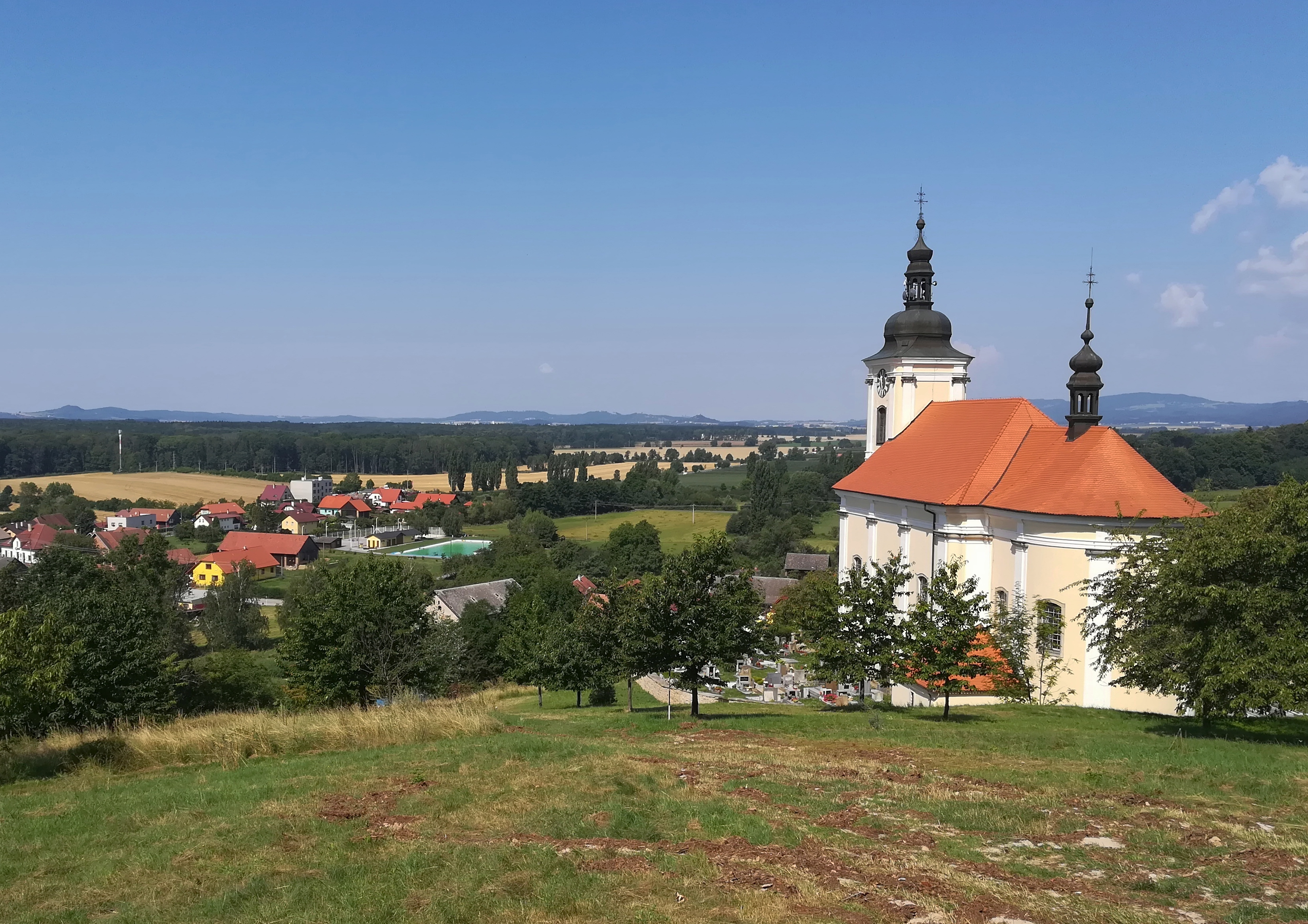
- Konecchlumí with the Church of Saints Peter and Paul

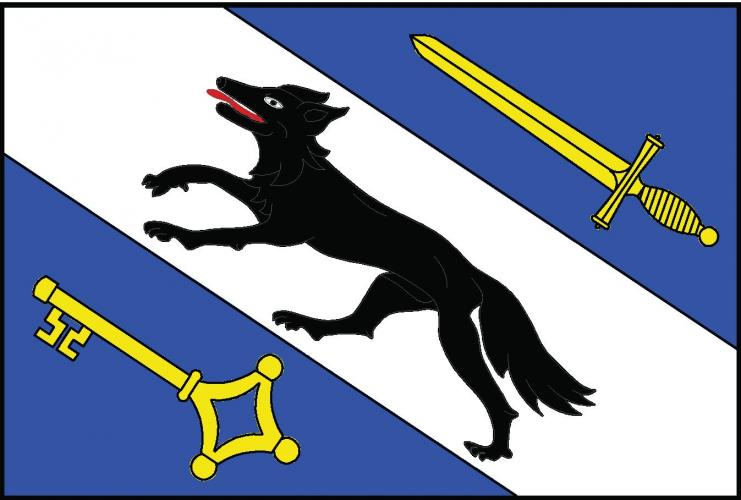
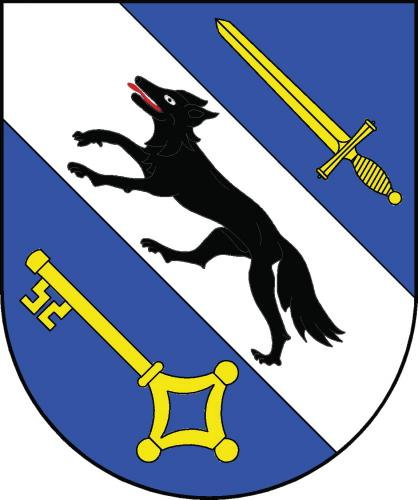
- Flag Coat of arms

- Location in the Czech Republic
- Coordinates: 50°24′8″N 15°28′49″E
- Country: Czech Republic
- Region: Hradec Králové
- District: Jičín
- First mentioned: 1226

Area
  - Total: 7.16 km^{2} (2.76 sq mi)
- Elevation: 283 m (928 ft)

Population (2026-01-01)
  - Total: 424
  - Density: 59.2/km^{2} (153/sq mi)
- Time zone: UTC+1 (CET)
  - Summer (DST): UTC+2 (CEST)
- Postal code: 507 05
- Website: www.konecchlumi-obec.cz

Konecchlumí (Czech pronunciation: [ˈkonɛtsxlumiː]) is a municipality and village in Jičín District in the Hradec Králové Region of the Czech Republic. It has about 400 inhabitants.

== Administrative division ==
Konecchlumí consists of two municipal parts (in brackets population according to the 2021 census):

- Konecchlumí (299)
- Kamenice (126)

== Demographics ==
Historical population
Year	Pop.	±%
1869	741	—
1880	764	+3.1%
1890	711	−6.9%
1900	645	−9.3%
1910	641	−0.6%
1921	597	−6.9%
1930	585	−2.0%
1950	441	−24.6%
1961	418	−5.2%
1970	370	−11.5%
1980	317	−14.3%
1991	315	−0.6%
2001	318	+1.0%
2011	365	+14.8%
2021	425	+16.4%
Source: Censuses
