= Nedrahovice =

- Municipality
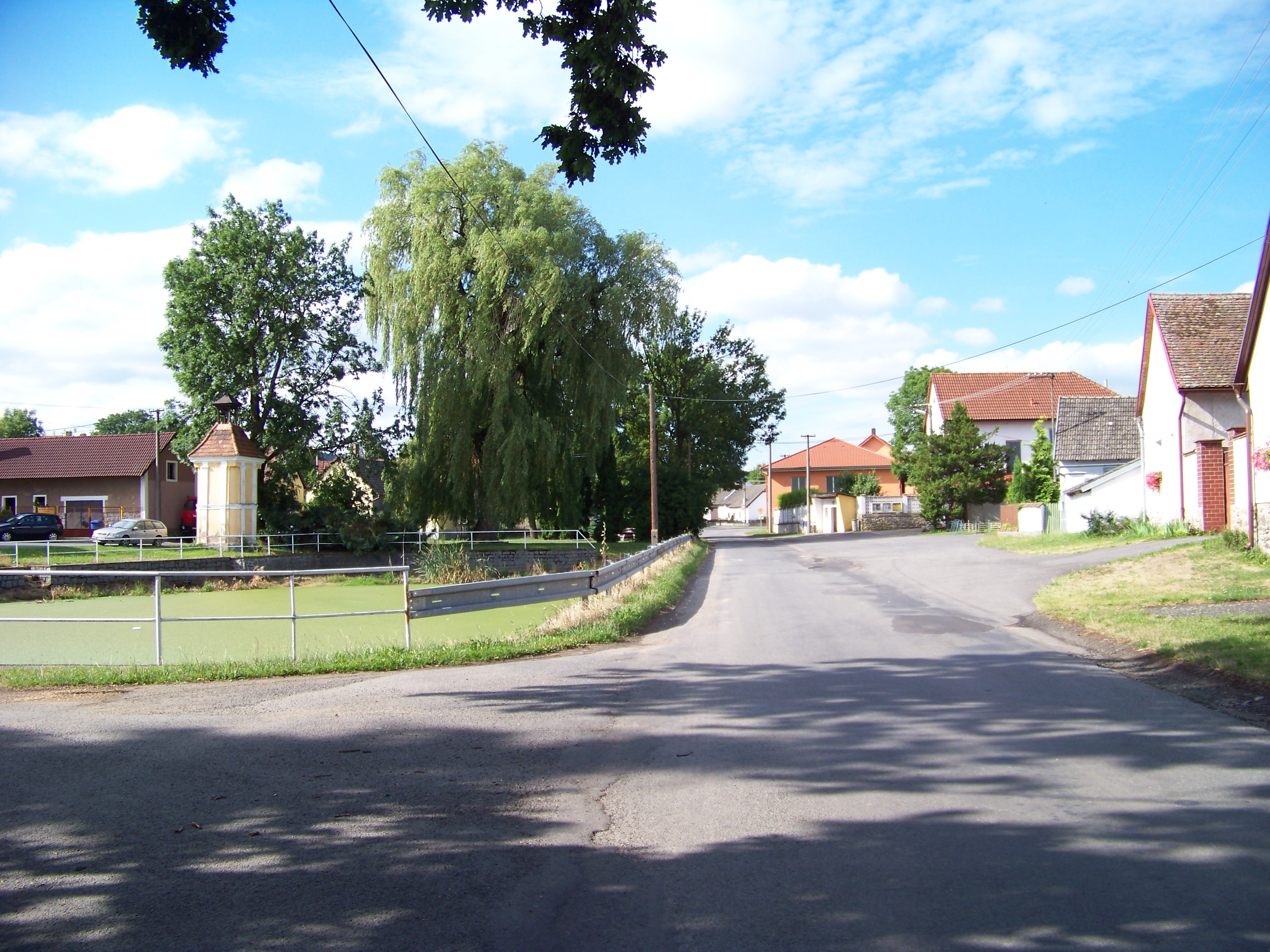
- Centre of Nedrahovice

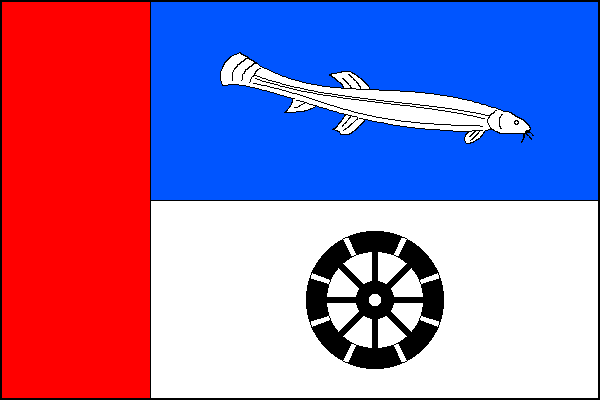
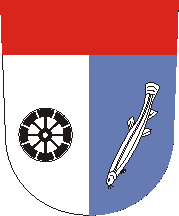
- Flag Coat of arms

- Location in the Czech Republic
- Coordinates: 49°36′33″N 14°27′21″E
- Country: Czech Republic
- Region: Central Bohemian
- District: Příbram
- First mentioned: 1366

Area
  - Total: 16.44 km^{2} (6.35 sq mi)
- Elevation: 387 m (1,270 ft)

Population (2026-01-01)
  - Total: 475
  - Density: 28.9/km^{2} (74.8/sq mi)
- Time zone: UTC+1 (CET)
  - Summer (DST): UTC+2 (CEST)
- Postal code: 264 01
- Website: www.nedrahovice.cz

Nedrahovice is a municipality and village in Příbram District in the Central Bohemian Region of the Czech Republic. It has about 500 inhabitants.

== Administrative division ==
Nedrahovice consists of eight municipal parts (in brackets population according to the 2021 census):

- Nedrahovice (199)
- Bor (53)
- Kamenice (59)
- Nedrahovické Podhájí (47)
- Radeč (38)
- Rudolec (16)
- Trkov (11)
- Úklid (40)

== Etymology ==
The name is derived from the personal name Nedrah, meaning "the village of Nedrah's people".

== Geography ==
Nedrahovice is located about 34 kilometres (21 mi) east of Příbram and 47 km (29 mi) south of Prague. It lies on the border between the Vlašim Uplands and Benešov Uplands. The highest point is a nameless hill at 566 m (1,857 ft) above sea level. The stream Sedlecký potok flows through the municipality. The municipal territory is rich in fishponds.

== History ==
The first written mention of Nedrahovice is from 1366, when a fortress probably already stood there. From the mid-16th century until 1621, the village was owned by the Czernin family. They had rebuilt the fortress into a castle. The castle was destroyed by a fire in 1795.

== Demographics ==
Historical population

| Year | Pop. | ±% |
|---|---|---|
| 1869 | 1,074 | — |
| 1880 | 1,013 | −5.7% |
| 1890 | 1,034 | +2.1% |
| 1900 | 994 | −3.9% |
| 1910 | 963 | −3.1% |

| Year | Pop. | ±% |
|---|---|---|
| 1921 | 919 | −4.6% |
| 1930 | 819 | −10.9% |
| 1950 | 672 | −17.9% |
| 1961 | 614 | −8.6% |
| 1970 | 532 | −13.4% |

| Year | Pop. | ±% |
|---|---|---|
| 1980 | 498 | −6.4% |
| 1991 | 452 | −9.2% |
| 2001 | 469 | +3.8% |
| 2011 | 449 | −4.3% |
| 2021 | 463 | +3.1% |

Source: Censuses

== Transport ==
There are no railways or major roads passing through the municipality.

== Sights ==
There are no protected cultural monuments in the municipality.
