= Klučenice =

- Municipality
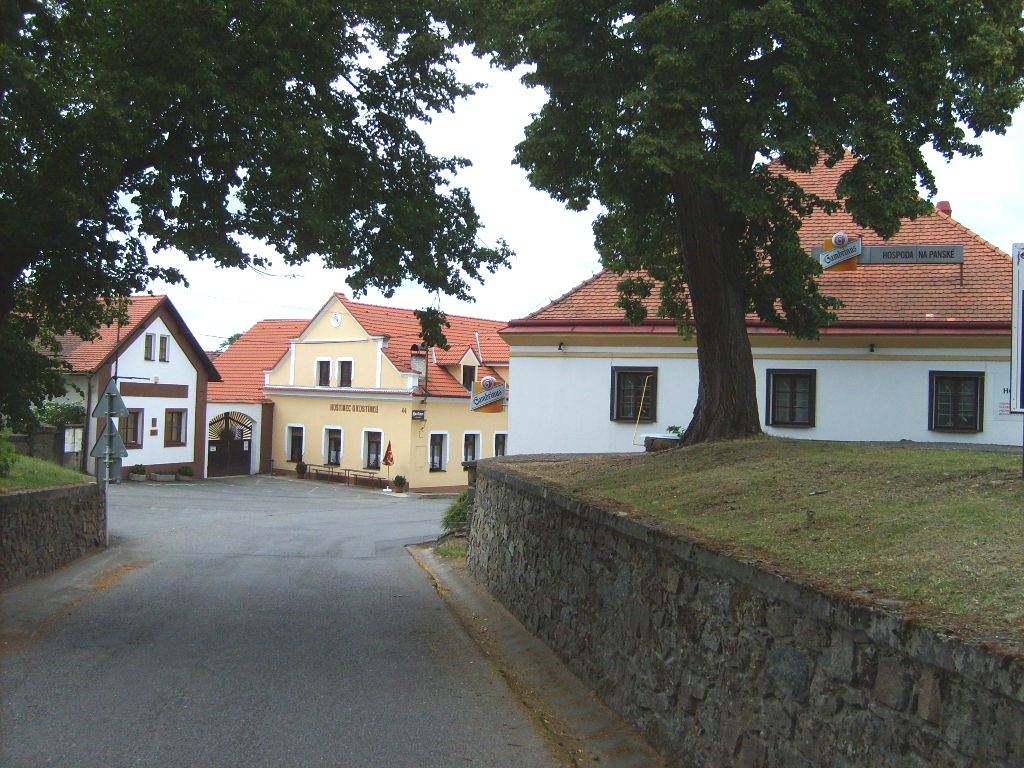
- Centre of Klučenice

- Flag Coat of arms

- Location in the Czech Republic
- Coordinates: 49°33′12″N 14°12′43″E
- Country: Czech Republic
- Region: Central Bohemian
- District: Příbram
- First mentioned: 1334

Area
  - Total: 25.66 km^{2} (9.91 sq mi)
- Elevation: 457 m (1,499 ft)

Population (2026-01-01)
  - Total: 481
  - Density: 18.7/km^{2} (48.5/sq mi)
- Time zone: UTC+1 (CET)
  - Summer (DST): UTC+2 (CEST)
- Postal code: 262 56
- Website: www.obecklucenice.cz

Klučenice is a municipality and village in Příbram District in the Central Bohemian Region of the Czech Republic. It has about 500 inhabitants.

== Administrative division ==
Klučenice consists of seven municipal parts (in brackets population according to the 2021 census):

- Klučenice (274)
- Kamenice (8)
- Kosobudy (39)
- Koubalova Lhota (25)
- Planá (18)
- Voltýřov (47)
- Zadní Chlum (31)

== Etymology ==
The name is derived from the old Czech adjective klučená (země), meaning 'overturned (soil)'.

== Geography ==
Klučenice is located about 21 kilometres (13 mi) southeast of Příbram and 56 km (35 mi) south of Prague. It lies in the Benešov Uplands. The highest point is the hill Hrby at 627 m (2,057 ft) above sea level. The western municipal border is formed by the Vltava River, respectively by the Orlík Reservoir, built on the Vltava.

== History ==
The first written mention of Klučenice is from 1334.

== Demographics ==
Historical population

Year	Pop.	±%
1869	1,826	—
1880	1,853	+1.5%
1890	1,639	−11.5%
1900	1,620	−1.2%
1910	1,522	−6.0%

Year	Pop.	±%
1921	1,462	−3.9%
1930	1,227	−16.1%
1950	864	−29.6%
1961	775	−10.3%
1970	647	−16.5%

Year	Pop.	±%
1980	566	−12.5%
1991	528	−6.7%
2001	474	−10.2%
2011	464	−2.1%
2021	442	−4.7%

Source: Censuses

== Transport ==
There are no railways or major roads passing through the municipality.

== Sights ==
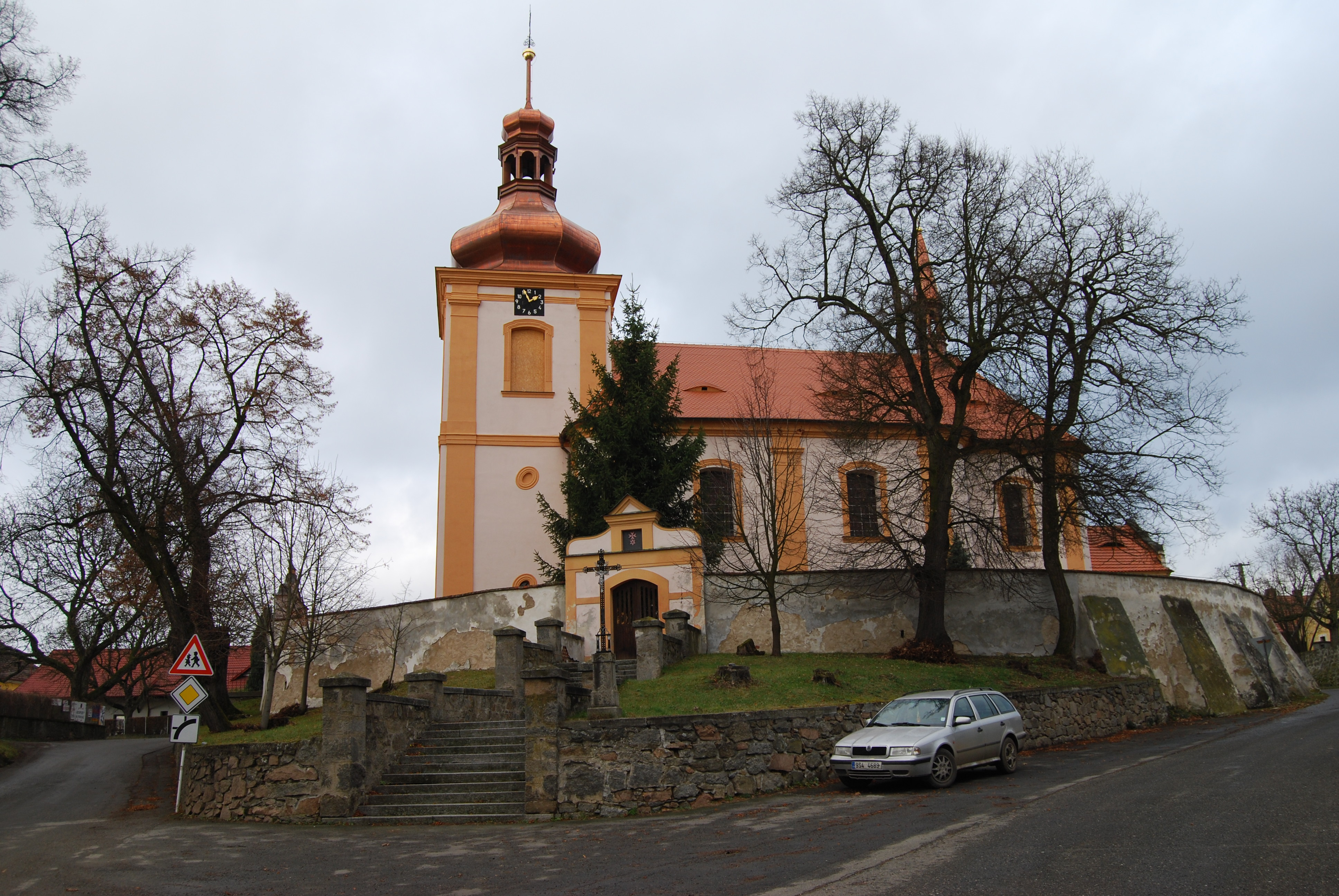
Church of Saints John the Baptist and Anthony the Hermit

The main landmark of Klučenice is the Church of Saints John the Baptist and Anthony the Hermit. The original church was first mentioned in 1384, but was burned down in 1721. The current Baroque church was built on its site in 1723–1725.
