= Nižná Kamenica =

Village and municipality in Slovakia

Nižná Kamenica Alsókemence
- Municipality
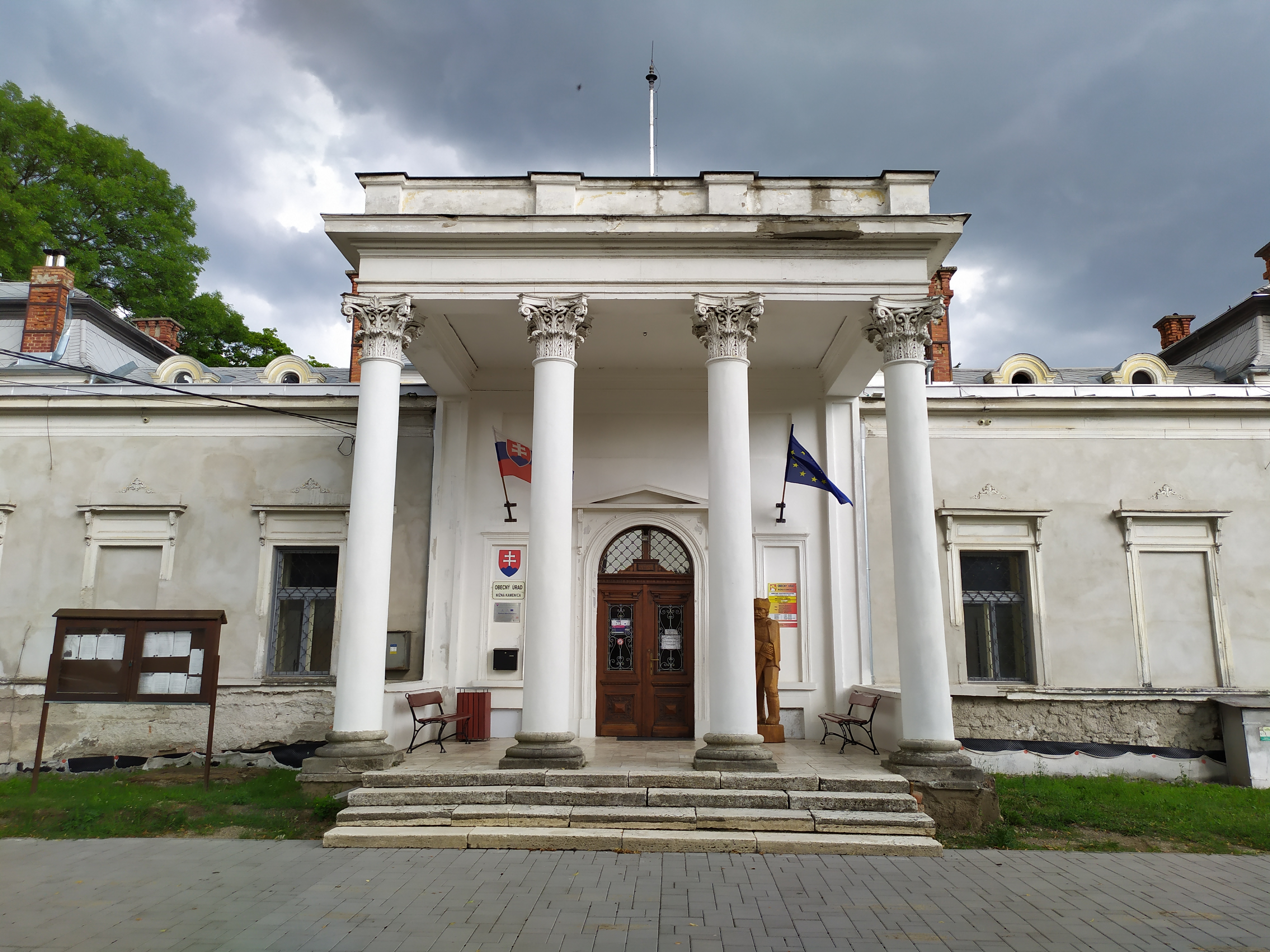
- A manor belonging to the Forgáčov family in Nižná Kamenica.

- Flag

- Location of Nižná Kamenica in the Košice Region Location of Nižná Kamenica in Slovakia
- Coordinates: 48.77°N 21.48°E
- Country: Slovakia
- Region: Košice Region
- District: Košice-okolie District
- First mentioned: 1427

Government
  - Mayor: Daniela Lukačova (SMER-SD, Hlas-SD, SME-RODINA)

Area
  - Total: 13.32 km^{2} (5.14 sq mi)
- Elevation: 302 m (991 ft)

Population (2025)
  - Total: 733
- Time zone: UTC+1 (CET)
  - Summer (DST): UTC+2 (CEST)
- Postal code: 444 5
- Area code: +421 55
- Vehicle registration plate (until 2022): KS
- Website: www.niznakamenica.sk

Nižná Kamenica (Hungarian: Alsókemence) is a village and municipality in Košice-okolie District in the Kosice Region of eastern Slovakia.

== History ==
In historical records, the village was first mentioned in 1347.

== Geography ==
The municipality lies at an altitude of 302 metres (991 ft) and covers an area of 13.32 km^{2} (5.14 sq mi) (2025).

== Population ==
Population statistic (10 years)
Year	1995	2005	2015	2025
Count	472	490	563	733
Difference		+3.81%	+14.89%	+30.19%

Population statistic
Year	2024	2025
Count	718	733
Difference		+2.08%

It has a population of 733 people (31 December 2025).

=== Ethnicity ===
Census 2021 (1+ %)
Ethnicity	Number	Fraction
Slovak	616	98.71%
Total	624	

In year 2021 was 624 people by ethnicity 616 as Slovak, 5 as Not found out, 4 as Czech, 2 as Ukrainian, 2 as Romanian, 2 as Hungarian, 1 as Jewish, 1 as Rusyn and 1 as Polish.

Note on population: The difference values of population numbers in the table "Population statistic" and in the sections "Ethnicity" & "Religion" is caused by the use of various statistical methods.

=== Religion ===
Census 2021 (1+ %)
Religion	Number	Fraction
Evangelical Church	218	34.94%
Roman Catholic Church	206	33.01%
None	84	13.46%
Greek Catholic Church	44	7.05%
Not found out	32	5.13%
Jehovah's Witnesses	12	1.92%
Calvinist Church	10	1.6%
Total	624	

In year 2021 was 624 people by religion 218 from Evangelical Church, 206 from Roman Catholic Church, 84 from None, 44 from Greek Catholic Church, 32 from Not found out, 12 from Jehovah's Witnesses, 10 from Calvinist Church, 5 from Apostolic Church, 4 from Seventh-day Adventist Church, 3 from Ad hoc movements, 2 from United Methodist Church, 1 from Eastern Orthodox Church, 1 from Paganism and natural spirituality, 1 from Christian Congregations in Slovakia and 1 from Buddhism.
