= Kamenicky =

Kamenicky may refer to:

== Places in the Czech Republic ==
- Kameničky, a municipality and village in the Pardubice Region
- Kameničky, a village and part of Trhová Kamenice in the Pardubice Region
- Kamenický Šenov, a town in the Liberec Region

== Other ==
- Kamenický encoding, a Czech character set encoding
- Kamenický of Kamenice, a Czech noble family originating from Moravia

== See also ==
- Kamenice (disambiguation)
- Kamenica (disambiguation)
