= Pustá Kamenice =

- Municipality
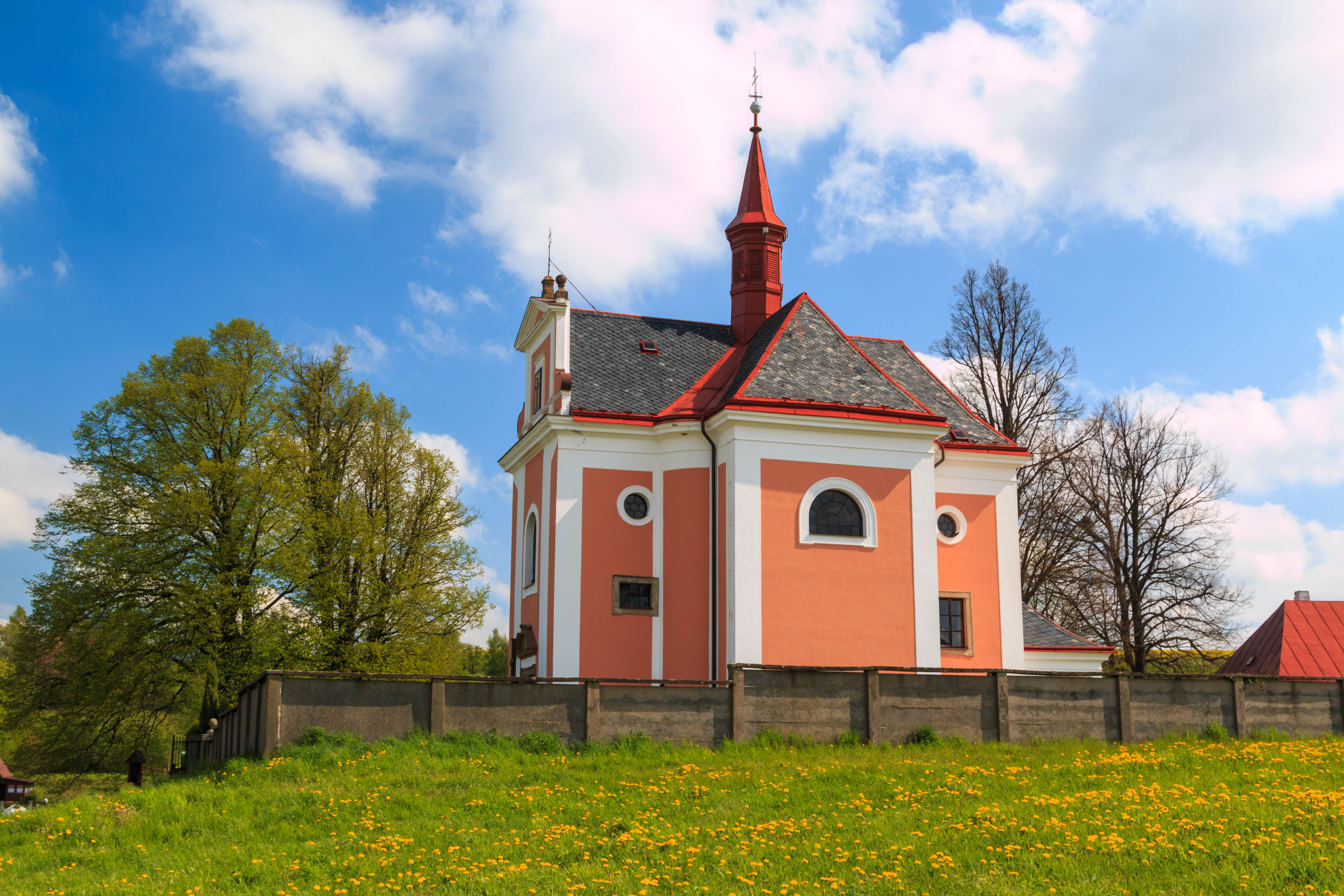
- Church of Saint Anne

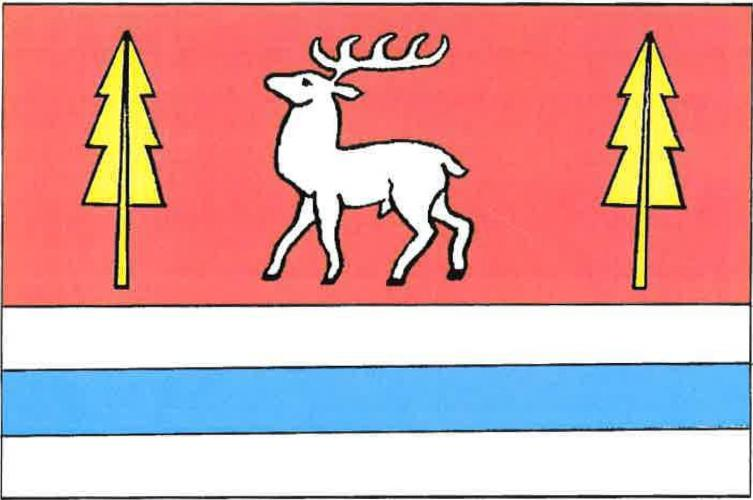
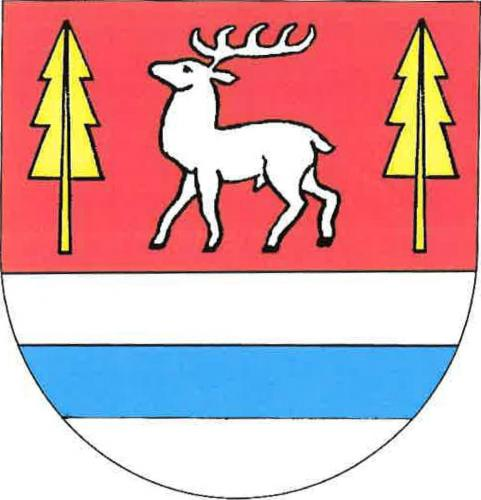
- Flag Coat of arms

- Location in the Czech Republic
- Coordinates: 49°45′22″N 16°5′9″E
- Country: Czech Republic
- Region: Pardubice
- District: Svitavy
- First mentioned: 1392

Area
  - Total: 15.30 km^{2} (5.91 sq mi)
- Elevation: 620 m (2,030 ft)

Population (2026-01-01)
  - Total: 319
  - Density: 20.8/km^{2} (54.0/sq mi)
- Time zone: UTC+1 (CET)
  - Summer (DST): UTC+2 (CEST)
- Postal code: 569 82
- Website: www.pustakamenice.cz

Pustá Kamenice is a municipality and village in Svitavy District in the Pardubice Region of the Czech Republic. It has about 300 inhabitants.

== Etymology ==
The word kamenice was a term for a stone chamber in village dwellings where food was stored. The prefix pustá (meaning 'desolate') probably referred to the desolate landscape around the village. There is also a theory that pustá referred to the time of the Hussite Wars, when the village was completely abandoned, but the prefix was documented already before the Hussite Wars.

== Geography ==
Pustá Kamenice is located about 27 kilometres (17 mi) west of Svitavy and 38 km (24 mi) southeast of Pardubice. Most of the municipal territory lies in the Upper Svratka Highlands, but the village proper lies in a tip of the Iron Mountains. The highest point is the hill Spálený kopec at 766 m (2,513 ft) above sea level. The stream Kamenická voda originates here and flows through the built-up area. The almost entire municipality lies within the Žďárské vrchy Protected Landscape Area.

== History ==
The first written mention of Pustá Kamenice is from 1392, when it was a mining settlement that belonged to the Rychmburk estate. In 1584, the village had a population of 15. In 1651, the population raised to 35. The inhabitants made their living mainly as charcoal burners, but after the surrounding forests were cut down, they switched to agriculture.

== Demographics ==
Historical population

Year	Pop.	±%
1869	786	—
1880	789	+0.4%
1890	692	−12.3%
1900	762	+10.1%
1910	732	−3.9%

Year	Pop.	±%
1921	774	+5.7%
1930	993	+28.3%
1950	461	−53.6%
1961	505	+9.5%
1970	448	−11.3%

Year	Pop.	±%
1980	392	−12.5%
1991	333	−15.1%
2001	347	+4.2%
2011	318	−8.4%
2021	310	−2.5%

Source: Censuses

== Transport ==
The I/34 road (the section from Svitavy to Havlíčkův Brod) runs through the northern part of the municipality.

Pustá Kamenice is located on the railway line Česká Třebová–Skuteč. The municipality is served by two train stops: Pustá Kamenice and Pustá Kamenice zastávka.

== Sights ==
The main landmark of Pustá Kamenice is the Church of Saint Anne. It was built in the early Baroque style in 1680–1690, after the old dilapidated church had to be demolished in 1677. It is an uncommon example of a rural church that is based on the Northern Mannerist architecture.
