= Kamenica (Kraljevo) =

Kamenica Каменица (Serbian)
- Village (Selo)
- Location within Serbia
- Country: Serbia
- Municipality: Kraljevo
- Time zone: UTC+1 (CET)
  - Summer (DST): UTC+2 (CEST)

Kamenica is a village situated in Kraljevo municipality in Serbia.
