= Kamenitza (geomorphology) =

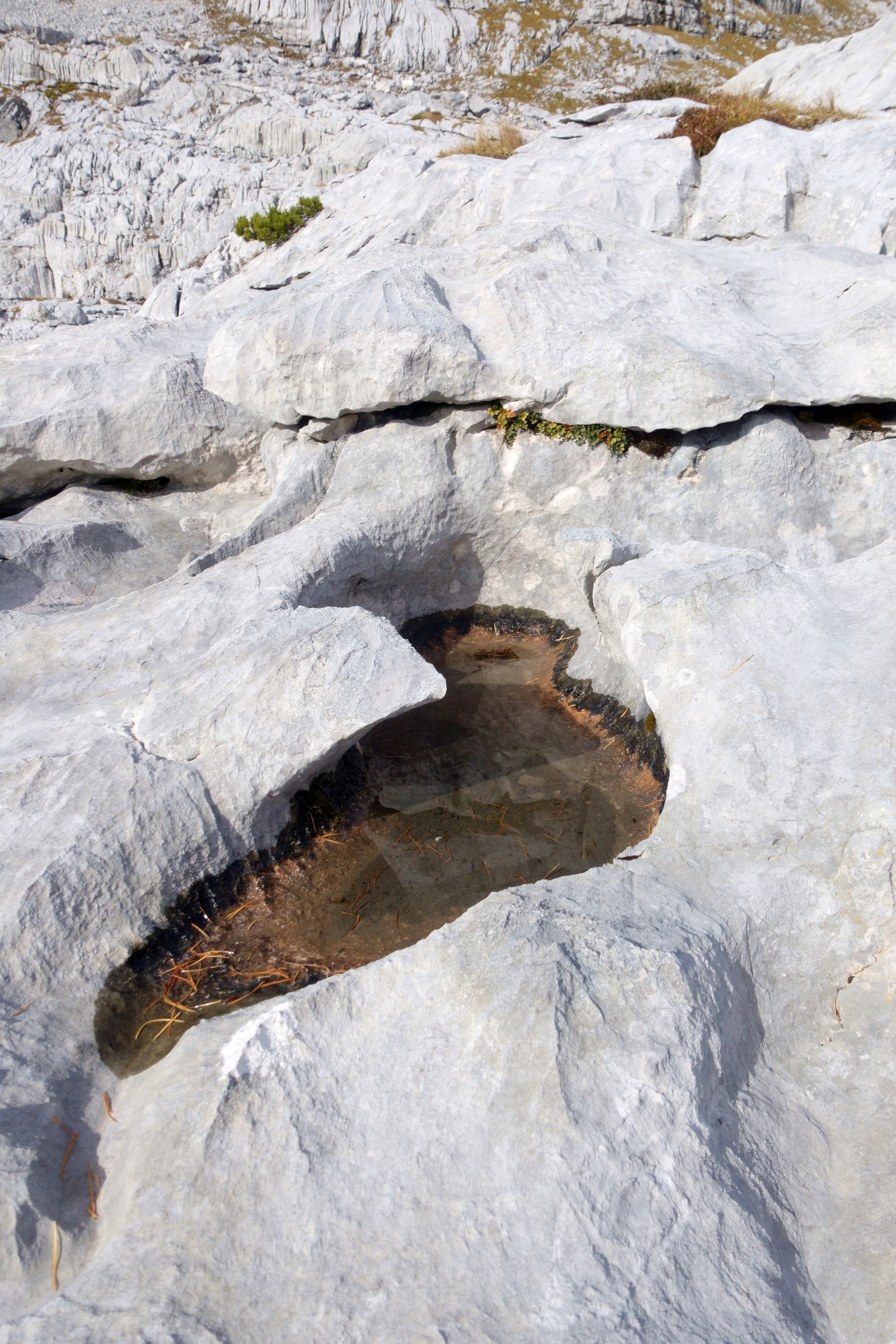
Kamenitza in Totes Gebirge, Austria

Kamenitzas or solution pans are closed depressions that develop on rock surfaces in karst regions formed by dissolution weathering. Usually they form on horizontal, or slightly inclined limestone pavements where water does not flow but collects into the small (many small) depressions. The presence of static water produces small, round, closed pans that are shallow as compared with their depth. Usually they have a diameter of several decimeters, but kamenitzas with a diameter up to 6 m have been documented. Overflow usually creates a solution runnel (karren). This overflow channel often lowers to the extent that it reaches the kamenitza bottom, where further development stops and the pan does not widen any longer. The name kamenitza is of Slavic origin where kamen means pebble. It came from the wrong hypothesis that small pebbles rotating in a water flow are forming the kamenitzas.

== See also ==
- Panhole
