= Kamenicë, Korçë =

Kamenicë
- Village
- Location within Albania
- Coordinates: 40°31′45″N 20°43′48″E
- Country: Albania
- County: Korçë
- Municipality: Korçë
- Administrative unit: Mollaj
- Time zone: UTC+1 (CET)
  - Summer (DST): UTC+2 (CEST)

Kamenicë is a community in Korçë County, southeastern Albania. At the 2015 local government reform it became part of the municipality Korçë.
