= Nižný Klátov =

Village and municipality in Slovakia

Nižný Klátov Alsótőkés
- Municipality
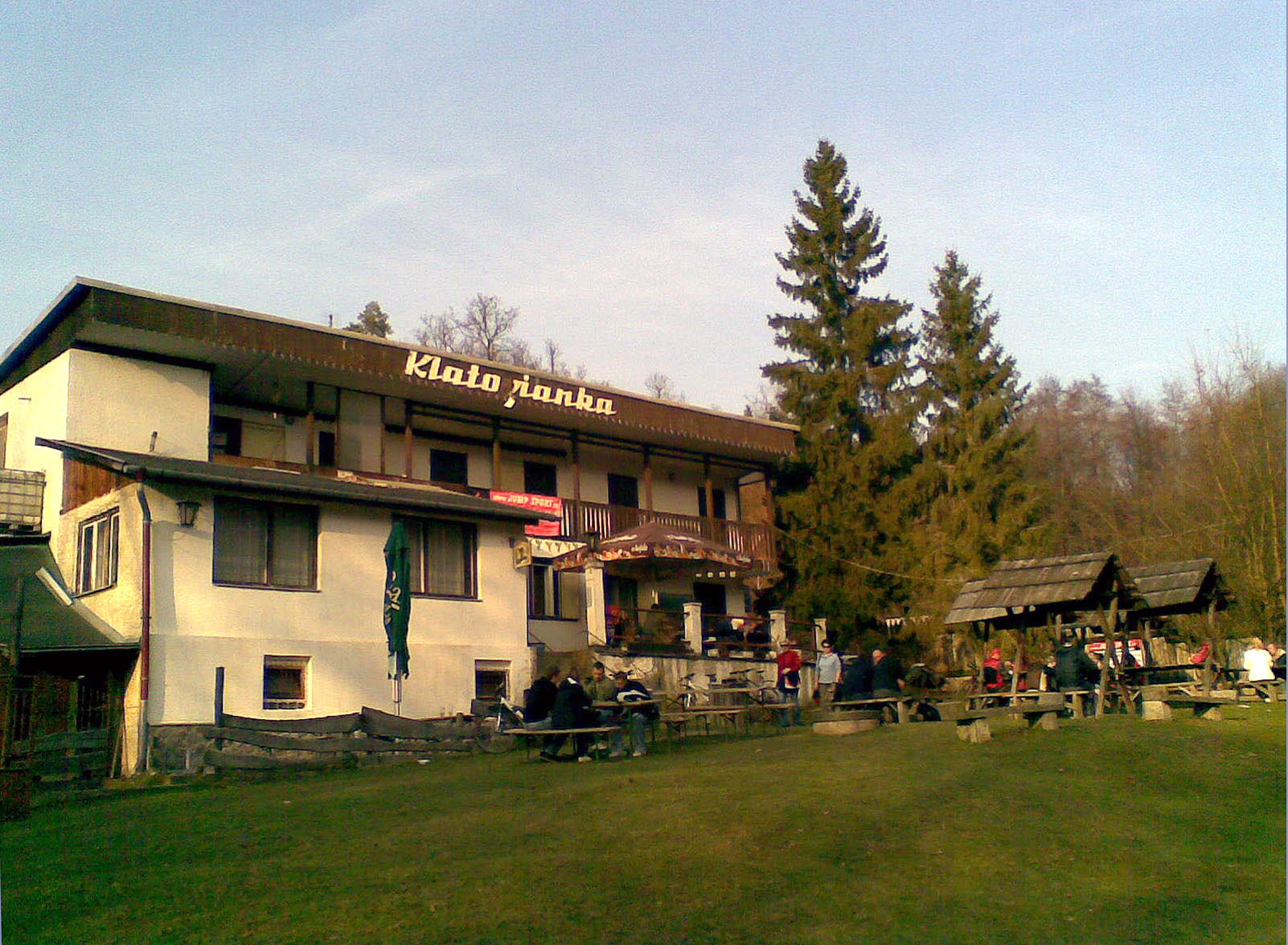

- Flag

- Location of Nižný Klátov in the Košice Region Location of Nižný Klátov in Slovakia
- Coordinates: 48.73°N 21.15°E
- Country: Slovakia
- Region: Košice Region
- District: Košice-okolie District
- First mentioned: 1317

Area
  - Total: 5.96 km^{2} (2.30 sq mi)
- Elevation: 353 m (1,158 ft)

Population (2025)
  - Total: 966
- Time zone: UTC+1 (CET)
  - Summer (DST): UTC+2 (CEST)
- Postal code: 441 2
- Area code: +421 55
- Vehicle registration plate (until 2022): KS
- Website: www.niznyklatov.sk

Nižný Klátov (German: Beckseifen, Beckenseifen; Hungarian: Alsótőkés) (1332/5 Inferior Turastukes, 1397 Al Teukes, 1400 Inferior Bokkenzeifin, 1580 Nieder-Beckseyffen) is a village and municipality in Košice-okolie District in the Košice Region of eastern Slovakia.

== History ==
In historical records the village was first mentioned in 1317 as a German medieval settlement.

== Geography ==
The municipality lies at an altitude of 353 metres (1,158 ft) and covers an area of 5.96 km^{2} (2.30 sq mi) (2025).

== Population ==
Population statistic (10 years)
Year	1995	2005	2015	2025
Count	581	649	778	966
Difference		+11.70%	+19.87%	+24.16%

Population statistic
Year	2024	2025
Count	941	966
Difference		+2.65%

It has a population of 966 people (31 December 2025).

=== Ethnicity ===
Census 2021 (1+ %)
Ethnicity	Number	Fraction
Slovak	830	94.53%
Not found out	43	4.89%
Total	878	

In year 2021 was 878 people by ethnicity 830 as Slovak, 43 as Not found out, 8 as Rusyn, 6 as Hungarian, 5 as Other, 3 as Czech, 3 as Russian and 1 as Croatian.

Note on population: The difference values of population numbers in the table "Population statistic" and in the sections "Ethnicity" & "Religion" is caused by the use of various statistical methods.

=== Religion ===
Census 2021 (1+ %)
Religion	Number	Fraction
Roman Catholic Church	543	61.85%
None	220	25.06%
Not found out	42	4.78%
Greek Catholic Church	24	2.73%
Evangelical Church	13	1.48%
Eastern Orthodox Church	9	1.03%
Total	878	

In year 2021 was 878 people by religion 543 from Roman Catholic Church, 220 from None, 42 from Not found out, 24 from Greek Catholic Church, 13 from Evangelical Church, 9 from Eastern Orthodox Church, 6 from Jehovah's Witnesses, 6 from Ad hoc movements, 4 from Other, 2 from Calvinist Church, 2 from Christian Congregations in Slovakia, 2 from Apostolic Church, 1 from Old Catholic Church, 1 from Paganism and natural spirituality, 1 from Other and not ascertained christian church, 1 from Church of the Brethren and 1 from Buddhism.

== Culture ==
The village has a public library, football ground and a guesthouse.
