= Rovné =

Rovné may refer to:

- Rovné in Humenné District, Slovakia
- Rovné in Rimavská Sobota District, Slovakia
- Rovné in Svidník District, Slovakia
