= Lieskovec =

Lieskovec may refer to:

- Lieskovec, Humenné District, Slovakia
- Lieskovec, Zvolen District, Slovakia
- Lieskovec, a district and manor in Podunajské Biskupice, Bratislava, Slovakia
