= Závadka, Humenné District =

Závadka
- Municipality
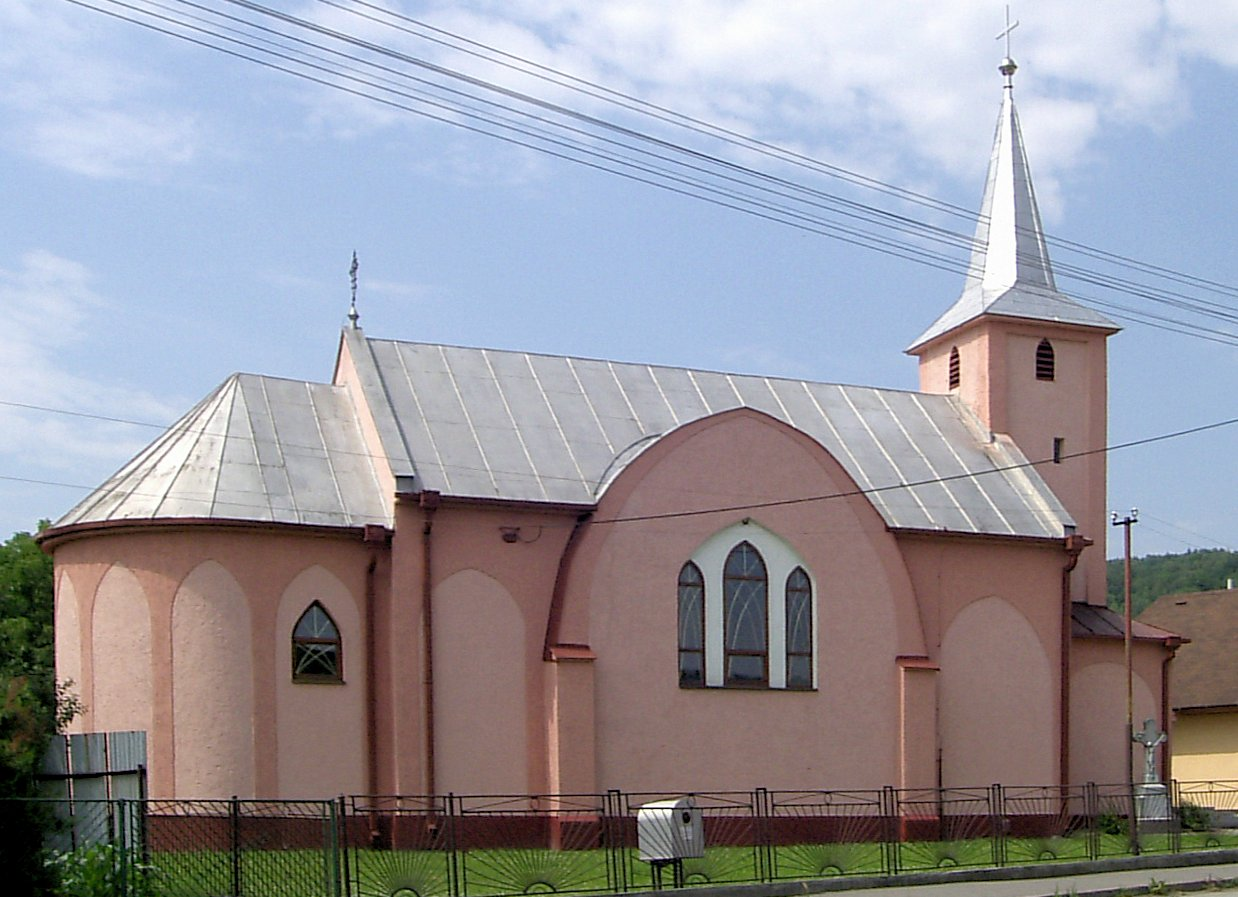

- Flag

- Location of Závadka in the Prešov Region Location of Závadka in Slovakia
- Coordinates: 48.93°N 21.84°E
- Country: Slovakia
- Region: Prešov Region
- District: Humenné District
- First mentioned: 1557

Area
  - Total: 5.70 km^{2} (2.20 sq mi)
- Elevation: 152 m (499 ft)

Population (2025)
  - Total: 546
- Time zone: UTC+1 (CET)
  - Summer (DST): UTC+2 (CEST)
- Postal code: 660 1
- Area code: +421 57
- Vehicle registration plate (until 2022): HE
- Website: www.zavadkahe.sk

Závadka is a village and municipality in Humenné District in the Prešov Region of north-east Slovakia.

== History ==
In historical records the village was first mentioned in 1557.

== Geography ==
The municipality lies at an altitude of 152 metres (499 ft) and covers an area of 5.70 km^{2} (2.20 sq mi) (2025).

== Population ==
Population statistic (10 years)
Year	1995	2005	2015	2025
Count	463	512	533	546
Difference		+10.58%	+4.10%	+2.43%

Population statistic
Year	2024	2025
Count	560	546
Difference		−2.5%

It has a population of 546 people (31 December 2025).

=== Ethnicity ===
Census 2021 (1+ %)
Ethnicity	Number	Fraction
Slovak	533	99.07%
Rusyn	6	1.11%
Total	538	

In year 2021 was 538 people by ethnicity 533 as Slovak, 6 as Rusyn, 3 as Not found out, 2 as Russian, 2 as Austrian, 2 as Other, 1 as Ukrainian, 1 as Romani and 1 as Hungarian.

Note on population: The difference values of population numbers in the table "Population statistic" and in the sections "Ethnicity" & "Religion" is caused by the use of various statistical methods.

=== Religion ===
Census 2021 (1+ %)
Religion	Number	Fraction
Roman Catholic Church	464	86.25%
Greek Catholic Church	40	7.43%
None	27	5.02%
Total	538	

In year 2021 was 538 people by religion 464 from Roman Catholic Church, 40 from Greek Catholic Church, 27 from None, 2 from Not found out, 2 from Evangelical Church, 2 from Ad hoc movements and 1 from Other.
