= Nižná Jablonka =

- Municipality
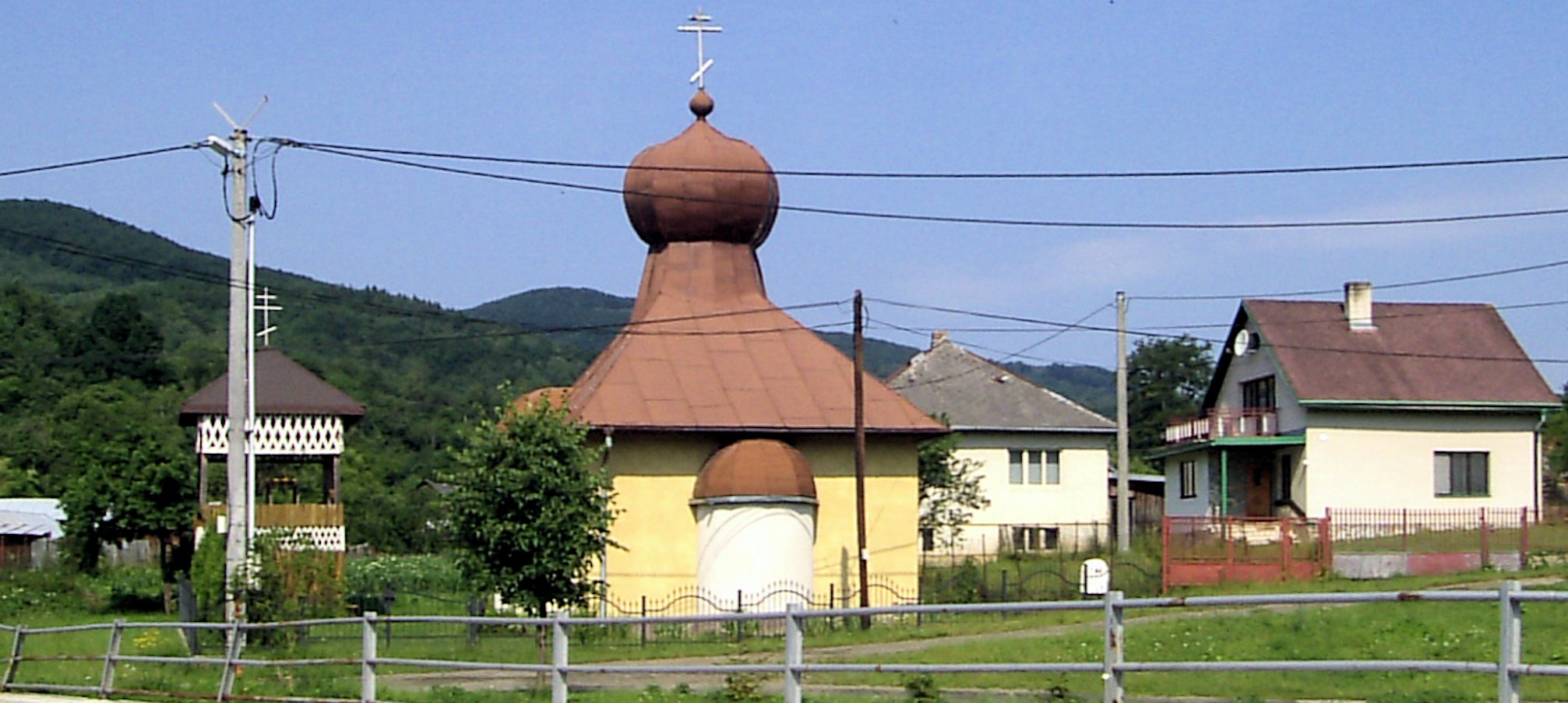

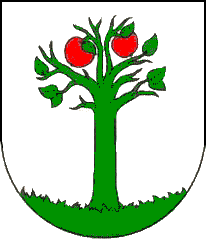
- Flag Coat of arms

- Location of Nižná Jablonka in the Prešov Region Location of Nižná Jablonka in Slovakia
- Coordinates: 49.13°N 22.10°E
- Country: Slovakia
- Region: Prešov Region
- District: Humenné District
- First mentioned: 1436

Area
  - Total: 11.89 km^{2} (4.59 sq mi)
- Elevation: 303 m (994 ft)

Population (2025)
  - Total: 135
- Time zone: UTC+1 (CET)
  - Summer (DST): UTC+2 (CEST)
- Postal code: 673 4
- Area code: +421 57
- Vehicle registration plate (until 2022): HE
- Website: www.niznajablonka.sk

Nižná Jablonka is a village and municipality in Humenné District in the Prešov Region of north-east Slovakia.

== History ==
The village was first mentioned in historical records in 1436.

== Geography ==
The municipality lies at an altitude of 303 metres (994 ft) and covers an area of 11.89 km^{2} (4.59 sq mi) (2025).

== Population ==
Population statistic (10 years)
| Year | 1995 | 2005 | 2015 | 2025 |
|---|---|---|---|---|
| Count | 176 | 180 | 185 | 135 |
| Difference | | +2.27% | +2.77% | −27.02% |

Population statistic
| Year | 2024 | 2025 |
|---|---|---|
| Count | 138 | 135 |
| Difference | | −2.17% |

It has a population of 135 people (31 December 2025).

=== Ethnicity ===
Census 2021 (1+ %)
| Ethnicity | Number | Fraction |
|---|---|---|
| Slovak | 121 | 82.31% |
| Rusyn | 41 | 27.89% |
| Romani | 32 | 21.76% |
| Not found out | 17 | 11.56% |
| Ukrainian | 4 | 2.72% |
| Total | 147 | |

In year 2021 was 147 people by ethnicity 121 as Slovak, 41 as Rusyn, 32 as Romani, 17 as Not found out and 4 as Ukrainian.

Note on population: The difference values of population numbers in the table "Population statistic" and in the sections "Ethnicity" & "Religion" is caused by the use of various statistical methods.

=== Religion ===
Census 2021 (1+ %)
| Religion | Number | Fraction |
|---|---|---|
| Greek Catholic Church | 84 | 57.14% |
| Roman Catholic Church | 20 | 13.61% |
| Eastern Orthodox Church | 20 | 13.61% |
| Not found out | 17 | 11.56% |
| None | 5 | 3.4% |
| Total | 147 | |

In year 2021 was 147 people by religion 84 from Greek Catholic Church, 20 from Roman Catholic Church, 20 from Eastern Orthodox Church, 17 from Not found out, 5 from None and 1 from Evangelical Church.
