= Nižné Ladičkovce =

- Municipality
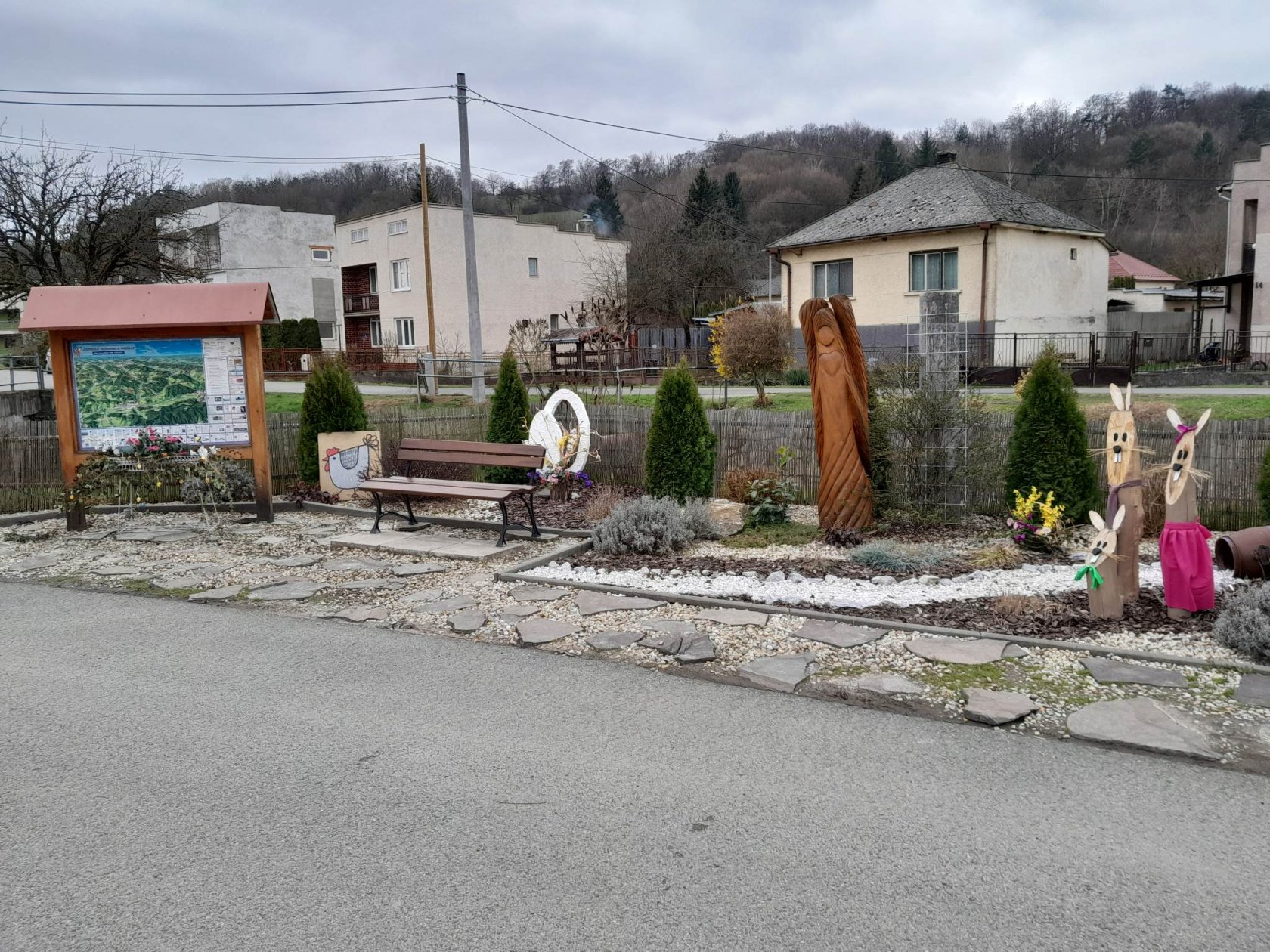

- Flag

- Location of Nižné Ladičkovce in the Prešov Region Location of Nižné Ladičkovce in Slovakia
- Coordinates: 49.02°N 21.92°E
- Country: Slovakia
- Region: Prešov Region
- District: Humenné District
- First mentioned: 1478

Area
  - Total: 8.57 km^{2} (3.31 sq mi)
- Elevation: 198 m (650 ft)

Population (2025)
  - Total: 314
- Time zone: UTC+1 (CET)
  - Summer (DST): UTC+2 (CEST)
- Postal code: 671 1
- Area code: +421 57
- Vehicle registration plate (until 2022): HE
- Website: www.nizneladickovce.sk

Nižné Ladičkovce is a village and municipality in Humenné District in the Prešov Region of north-east Slovakia.

== History ==
In historical records the village was first mentioned in 1478.

== Geography ==
The municipality lies at an altitude of 198 metres (650 ft) and covers an area of 8.57 km^{2} (3.31 sq mi) (2025).

== Population ==
Population statistic (10 years)
Year	1995	2005	2015	2025
Count	340	361	356	314
Difference		+6.17%	−1.38%	−11.79%

Population statistic
Year	2024	2025
Count	321	314
Difference		−2.18%

It has a population of 314 people (31 December 2025).

=== Ethnicity ===
Census 2021 (1+ %)
Ethnicity	Number	Fraction
Slovak	322	98.17%
Rusyn	10	3.04%
Not found out	6	1.82%
Total	328	

In year 2021 was 328 people by ethnicity 322 as Slovak, 10 as Rusyn, 6 as Not found out and 1 as Other.

Note on population: The difference values of population numbers in the table "Population statistic" and in the sections "Ethnicity" & "Religion" is caused by the use of various statistical methods.

=== Religion ===
Census 2021 (1+ %)
Religion	Number	Fraction
Roman Catholic Church	309	94.21%
Greek Catholic Church	7	2.13%
Not found out	5	1.52%
None	5	1.52%
Total	328	

In year 2021 was 328 people by religion 309 from Roman Catholic Church, 7 from Greek Catholic Church, 5 from Not found out, 5 from None, 1 from Eastern Orthodox Church and 1 from Ad hoc movements.
