= Ruská Kajňa =

- Municipality
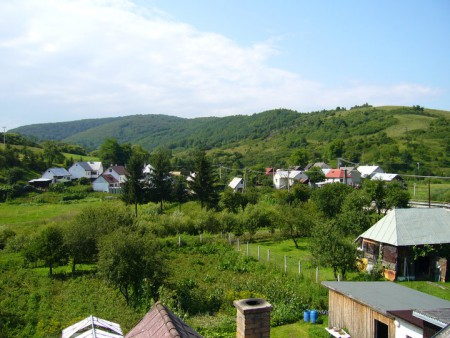

- Flag

- Location of Ruská Kajňa in the Prešov Region Location of Ruská Kajňa in Slovakia
- Coordinates: 49.12°N 21.83°E
- Country: Slovakia
- Region: Prešov Region
- District: Humenné District
- First mentioned: 1582

Area
  - Total: 5.10 km^{2} (1.97 sq mi)
- Elevation: 203 m (666 ft)

Population (2025)
  - Total: 95
- Time zone: UTC+1 (CET)
  - Summer (DST): UTC+2 (CEST)
- Postal code: 940 7
- Area code: +421 57
- Vehicle registration plate (until 2022): HE
- Website: ruska-kajna.webnode.sk

Ruská Kajňa (Rusyn: Руська Кайня is a village and municipality in Humenné District in the Prešov Region of north-east Slovakia.

== Geography ==
The municipality lies at an altitude of 203 metres (666 ft) and covers an area of 5.10 km^{2} (1.97 sq mi) (2025).

== Population ==
Population statistic (10 years)
Year	1995	2005	2015	2025
Count	162	125	112	95
Difference		−22.83%	−10.4%	−15.17%

Population statistic
Year	2024	2025
Count	100	95
Difference		−5%

It has a population of 95 people (31 December 2025).

=== Ethnicity ===
Census 2021 (1+ %)
Ethnicity	Number	Fraction
Slovak	92	85.18%
Rusyn	46	42.59%
Not found out	6	5.55%
Total	108	

In year 2021 was 108 people by ethnicity 92 as Slovak, 46 as Rusyn, 6 as Not found out and 1 as Romani.

Note on population: The difference values of population numbers in the table "Population statistic" and in the sections "Ethnicity" & "Religion" is caused by the use of various statistical methods.

=== Religion ===
Census 2021 (1+ %)
Religion	Number	Fraction
Greek Catholic Church	95	87.96%
Roman Catholic Church	7	6.48%
Not found out	5	4.63%
Total	108	

In year 2021 was 108 people by religion 95 from Greek Catholic Church, 7 from Roman Catholic Church, 5 from Not found out and 1 from None.
