= Koškovce =

- Municipality
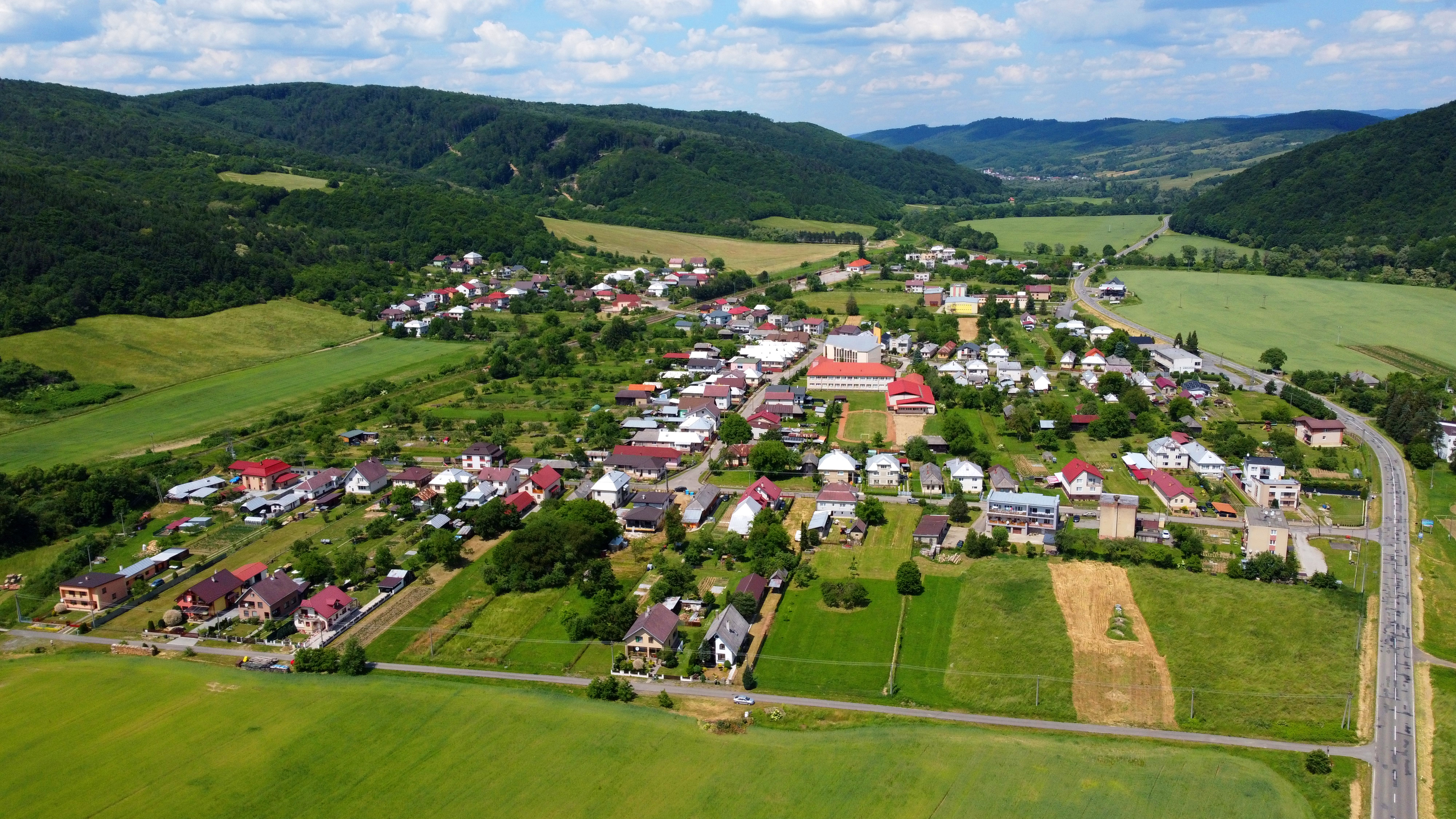

- Flag

- Location of Koškovce in the Prešov Region Location of Koškovce in Slovakia
- Coordinates: 49.05°N 21.97°E
- Country: Slovakia
- Region: Prešov Region
- District: Humenné District
- First mentioned: 1543

Area
  - Total: 11.70 km^{2} (4.52 sq mi)
- Elevation: 187 m (614 ft)

Population (2025)
  - Total: 517
- Time zone: UTC+1 (CET)
  - Summer (DST): UTC+2 (CEST)
- Postal code: 671 2
- Area code: +421 57
- Vehicle registration plate (until 2022): HE
- Website: koskovce.sk

Koškovce is a village and municipality in Humenné District in the Prešov Region of north-east Slovakia.

== History ==
In historical records the village was first mentioned in 1543. The village is documented from 1543 as Koskoc, later as Koskowcze 1773; in Hungarian Koskóc. It belonged to the Humenné estate, in the late 17th and 18th centuries to the Csáky family, and in the 19th century to the Andrássy family. The old church was built in 1584 in the Romanesque style. It was rebuilt in the Baroque style in the 18th century. Its present-day form in the classicist style is from the beginning of the 19th century. In 1715, the village had 7 abandoned and 7 inhabited households, in 1787 it had 46 houses and 320 inhabitants, in 1828 it had 64 houses and 480 inhabitants. They made a living by carting, logging, weaving and making wooden tools. In the 19th century, there was a quarry in the village. During the first census in 1787, the village had 46 houses and 320 inhabitants. In the past, the inhabitants were engaged in traditional agriculture, weaving, forestry, rope making and tool making. Until 1918, Koškovce belonged to the See of Zemplín. In the fall of 1944, there was partisan activity here. Part of the population worked in industrial enterprises in Humenno, Košice and Medzilaborce. There was a flysch slate quarry. During the First Czechoslovakia, the employment of residents did not change. JRD was founded in 1959. One of the landmarks of the village is the new church dedicated to the Holy Spirit. It was consecrated in 1982. Its interior has stained glass windows by academic painter Vincent Hložník. Currently, there are 174 houses in the village, in which 623 inhabitants live. They are engaged in agriculture, woodworking, some of them commute to Humenné for work. Koškovce is a resort village.

== Geography ==
The municipality lies at an altitude of 187 metres (614 ft) and covers an area of 11.70 km^{2} (4.52 sq mi) (2025).

== Population ==
Population statistic (10 years)
Year	1995	2005	2015	2025
Count	617	621	612	517
Difference		+0.64%	−1.44%	−15.52%

Population statistic
Year	2024	2025
Count	528	517
Difference		−2.08%

It has a population of 517 people (31 December 2025).

=== Ethnicity ===
Census 2021 (1+ %)
Ethnicity	Number	Fraction
Slovak	562	97.9%
Rusyn	22	3.83%
Not found out	15	2.61%
Total	574	

In year 2021 was 574 people by ethnicity 562 as Slovak, 22 as Rusyn, 15 as Not found out, 3 as Czech, 2 as Irish, 2 as Ukrainian and 1 as Other.

Note on population: The difference values of population numbers in the table "Population statistic" and in the sections "Ethnicity" & "Religion" is caused by the use of various statistical methods.

=== Religion ===
Census 2021 (1+ %)
Religion	Number	Fraction
Roman Catholic Church	494	86.06%
None	33	5.75%
Greek Catholic Church	31	5.4%
Not found out	9	1.57%
Total	574	

In year 2021 was 574 people by religion 494 from Roman Catholic Church, 33 from None, 31 from Greek Catholic Church, 9 from Not found out, 2 from Eastern Orthodox Church, 1 from Other and not ascertained christian church, 1 from Christian Congregations in Slovakia, 1 from Other, 1 from Evangelical Church and 1 from Ad hoc movements.
