= Hrubov =

- Municipality
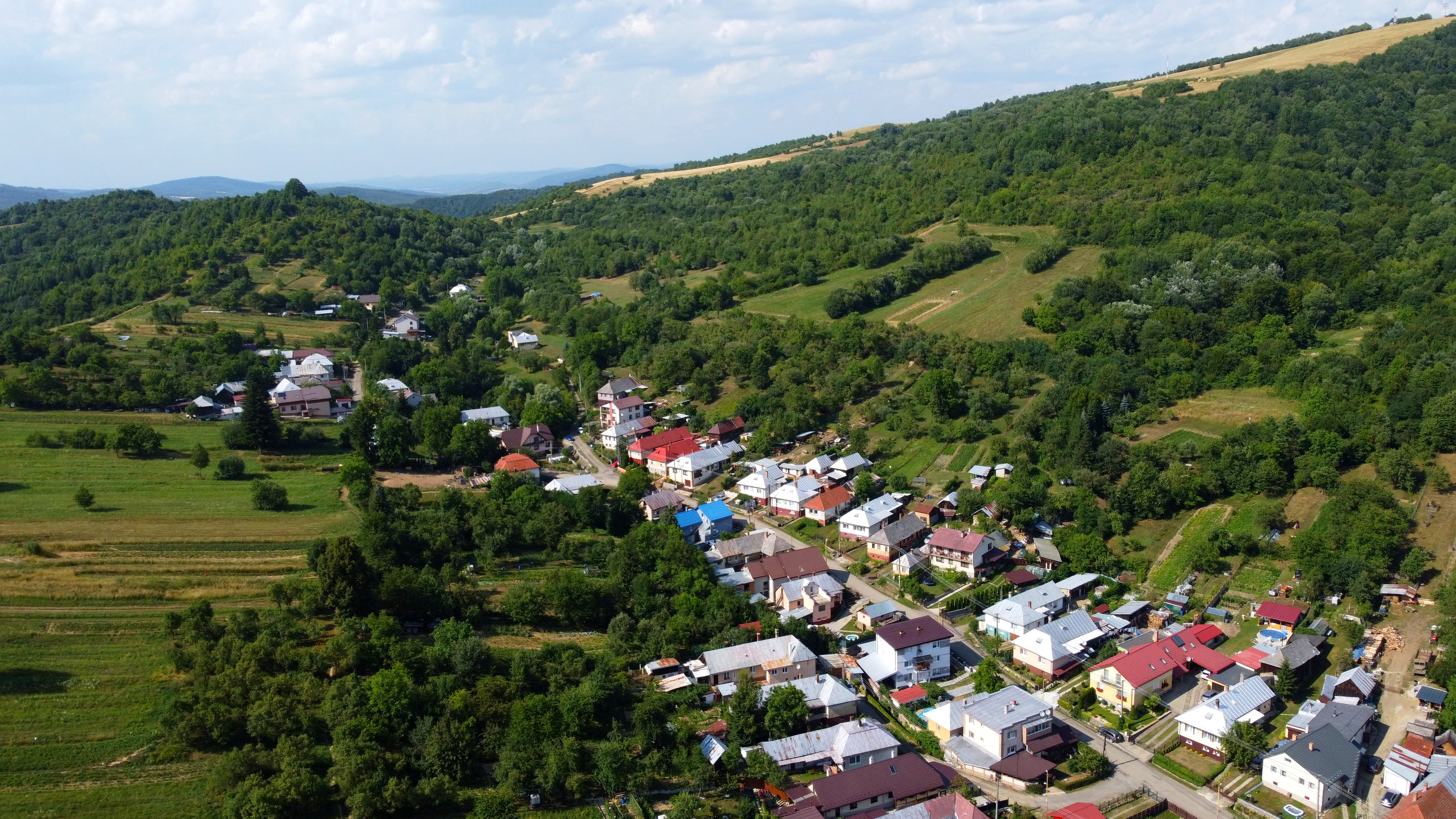

- Flag

- Location of Hrubov in the Prešov Region Location of Hrubov in Slovakia
- Coordinates: 49.10°N 21.87°E
- Country: Slovakia
- Region: Prešov Region
- District: Humenné District
- First mentioned: 1478

Area
  - Total: 14.41 km^{2} (5.56 sq mi)
- Elevation: 306 m (1,004 ft)

Population (2025)
  - Total: 464
- Time zone: UTC+1 (CET)
  - Summer (DST): UTC+2 (CEST)
- Postal code: 672 3
- Area code: +421 57
- Vehicle registration plate (until 2022): HE
- Website: www.hrubov.sk

Hrubov is a village and municipality in Humenné District in the Prešov Region of north-east Slovakia.

== History ==
In historical records the village was first mentioned in 1478.

== Geography ==
The municipality lies at an altitude of 306 metres (1,004 ft) and covers an area of 14.41 km^{2} (5.56 sq mi) (2025).

== Population ==
Population statistic (10 years)
Year	1995	2005	2015	2025
Count	566	523	489	464
Difference		−7.59%	−6.50%	−5.11%

Population statistic
Year	2024	2025
Count	464	464
Difference		+0%

It has a population of 464 people (31 December 2025).

=== Ethnicity ===
Census 2021 (1+ %)
Ethnicity	Number	Fraction
Slovak	471	98.53%
Total	478	

In year 2021 was 478 people by ethnicity 471 as Slovak, 3 as Romani, 3 as Not found out, 2 as Rusyn, 1 as Irish, 1 as Hungarian and 1 as Other.

Note on population: The difference values of population numbers in the table "Population statistic" and in the sections "Ethnicity" & "Religion" is caused by the use of various statistical methods.

=== Religion ===
Census 2021 (1+ %)
Religion	Number	Fraction
Roman Catholic Church	458	95.82%
None	10	2.09%
Greek Catholic Church	8	1.67%
Total	478	

In year 2021 was 478 people by religion 458 from Roman Catholic Church, 10 from None, 8 from Greek Catholic Church, 1 from Not found out and 1 from Christian Congregations in Slovakia.
