= Karná =

- Municipality
- Flag Coat of arms

- Location of Karná in the Prešov Region Location of Karná in Slovakia
- Coordinates: 48.98°N 21.80°E
- Country: Slovakia
- Region: Prešov Region
- District: Humenné District
- First mentioned: 1543

Area
  - Total: 10.26 km^{2} (3.96 sq mi)
- Elevation: 188 m (617 ft)

Population (2025)
  - Total: 470
- Time zone: UTC+1 (CET)
  - Summer (DST): UTC+2 (CEST)
- Postal code: 674 5
- Area code: +421 57
- Vehicle registration plate (until 2022): HE
- Website: www.karna.sk

Karná (Hungarian: Kiskárna) is a village and municipality in Humenné District in the Prešov Region of north-east Slovakia.

== History ==
The village was first mentioned in historical records in 1543.

== Geography ==
The municipality lies at an altitude of 188 metres (617 ft) and covers an area of 10.26 km^{2} (3.96 sq mi) (2025).

== Population ==
Population statistic (10 years)
Year	1995	2005	2015	2025
Count	433	439	454	470
Difference		+1.38%	+3.41%	+3.52%

Population statistic
Year	2024	2025
Count	457	470
Difference		+2.84%

It has a population of 470 people (31 December 2025).

=== Ethnicity ===
Census 2021 (1+ %)
Ethnicity	Number	Fraction
Slovak	430	93.88%
Romani	53	11.57%
Not found out	17	3.71%
Total	458	

In year 2021 was 458 people by ethnicity 430 as Slovak, 53 as Romani, 17 as Not found out, 2 as Rusyn, 2 as Polish, 1 as Czech and 1 as Austrian.

Note on population: The difference values of population numbers in the table "Population statistic" and in the sections "Ethnicity" & "Religion" is caused by the use of various statistical methods.

=== Religion ===
Census 2021 (1+ %)
Religion	Number	Fraction
Roman Catholic Church	409	89.3%
None	22	4.8%
Not found out	10	2.18%
Apostolic Church	8	1.75%
Greek Catholic Church	7	1.53%
Total	458	

In year 2021 was 458 people by religion 409 from Roman Catholic Church, 22 from None, 10 from Not found out, 8 from Apostolic Church, 7 from Greek Catholic Church, 1 from Christian Congregations in Slovakia and 1 from Ad hoc movements.
