= Víťazovce =

- Municipality
- Flag

- Location of Víťazovce in the Prešov Region Location of Víťazovce in Slovakia
- Coordinates: 49.01°N 21.80°E
- Country: Slovakia
- Region: Prešov Region
- District: Humenné District
- First mentioned: 1451

Area
  - Total: 5.56 km^{2} (2.15 sq mi)
- Elevation: 168 m (551 ft)

Population (2025)
  - Total: 326
- Time zone: UTC+1 (CET)
  - Summer (DST): UTC+2 (CEST)
- Postal code: 672 4
- Area code: +421 57
- Vehicle registration plate (until 2022): HE
- Website: www.vitazovce.sk

Víťazovce is a village and municipality in Humenné District in the Prešov Region of north-east Slovakia.

== History ==
In historical records the village was first mentioned in 1451.

== Geography ==
The municipality lies at an altitude of 168 metres (551 ft) and covers an area of 5.56 km^{2} (2.15 sq mi) (2025).

== Population ==
Population statistic (10 years)
Year	1995	2005	2015	2025
Count	336	345	303	326
Difference		+2.67%	−12.17%	+7.59%

Population statistic
Year	2024	2025
Count	321	326
Difference		+1.55%

It has a population of 326 people (31 December 2025).

=== Ethnicity ===
Census 2021 (1+ %)
Ethnicity	Number	Fraction
Slovak	294	98%
Rusyn	8	2.66%
Not found out	4	1.33%
Total	300	

In year 2021 was 300 people by ethnicity 294 as Slovak, 8 as Rusyn, 4 as Not found out, 2 as Polish, 1 as Romani and 1 as German.

Note on population: The difference values of population numbers in the table "Population statistic" and in the sections "Ethnicity" & "Religion" is caused by the use of various statistical methods.

=== Religion ===
Census 2021 (1+ %)
Religion	Number	Fraction
Roman Catholic Church	262	87.33%
None	14	4.67%
Greek Catholic Church	13	4.33%
Not found out	5	1.67%
Eastern Orthodox Church	4	1.33%
Total	300	

In year 2021 was 300 people by religion 262 from Roman Catholic Church, 14 from None, 13 from Greek Catholic Church, 5 from Not found out, 4 from Eastern Orthodox Church, 1 from Other and 1 from Buddhism.
