= Gruzovce =

- Municipality
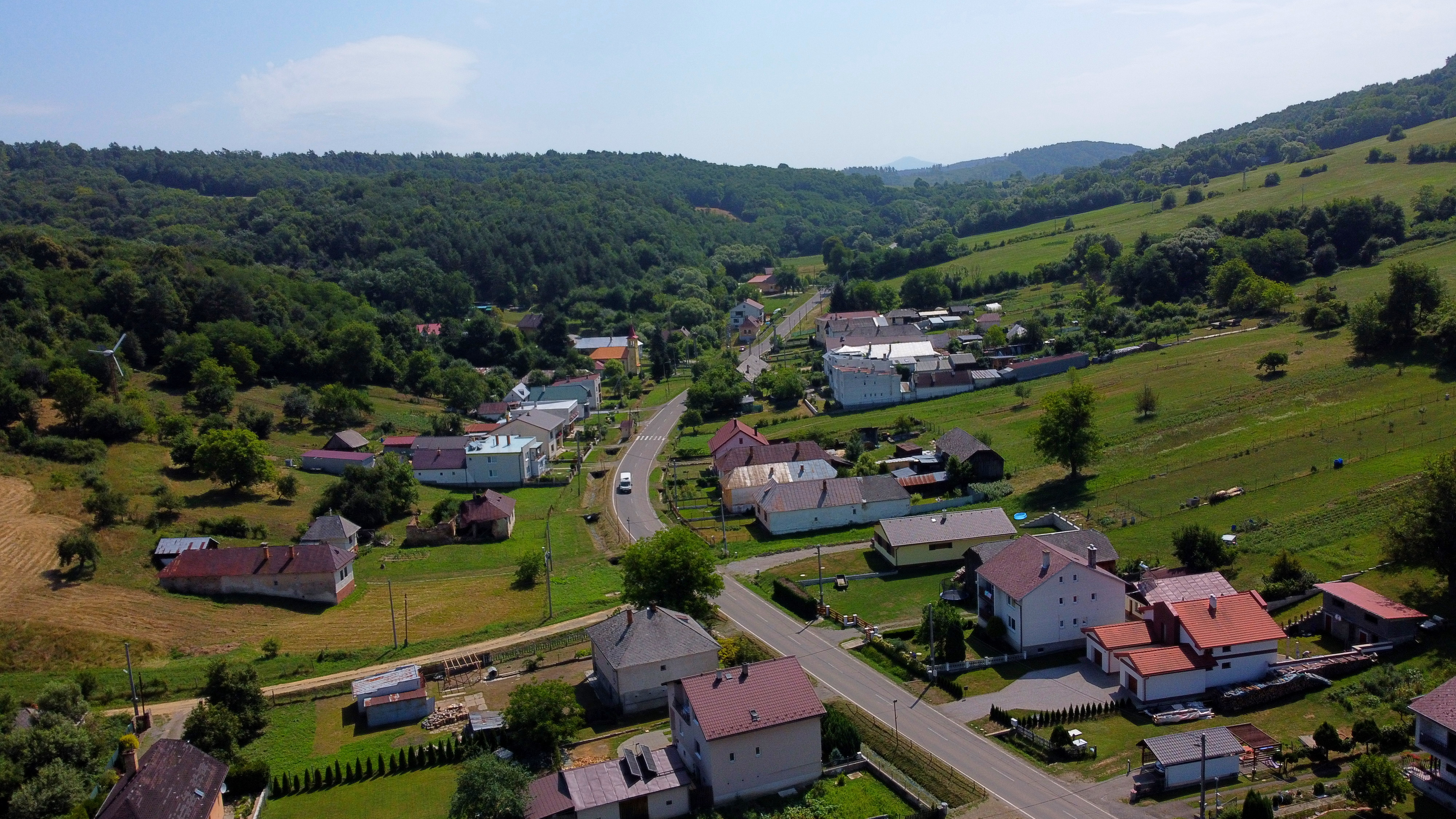

- Flag

- Location of Gruzovce in the Prešov Region Location of Gruzovce in Slovakia
- Coordinates: 48.98°N 21.87°E
- Country: Slovakia
- Region: Prešov Region
- District: Humenné District
- First mentioned: 1568

Area
  - Total: 4.09 km^{2} (1.58 sq mi)
- Elevation: 178 m (584 ft)

Population (2025)
  - Total: 136
- Time zone: UTC+1 (CET)
  - Summer (DST): UTC+2 (CEST)
- Postal code: 672 2
- Area code: +421 57
- Vehicle registration plate (until 2022): HE
- Website: gruzovce.sk

Gruzovce is a village and municipality in Humenné District in the Prešov Region of north-east Slovakia.

== History ==
In historical records the village was first mentioned in 1568.

== Geography ==
The municipality lies at an altitude of 178 metres (584 ft) and covers an area of 4.09 km^{2} (1.58 sq mi) (2025).

== Population ==
Population statistic (10 years)
Year	1995	2005	2015	2025
Count	128	124	126	136
Difference		−3.12%	+1.61%	+7.93%

Population statistic
Year	2024	2025
Count	137	136
Difference		−0.72%

It has a population of 136 people (31 December 2025).

=== Ethnicity ===
Census 2021 (1+ %)
Ethnicity	Number	Fraction
Slovak	131	99.24%
Not found out	2	1.51%
Total	132	

In year 2021 was 132 people by ethnicity 131 as Slovak, 2 as Not found out and 1 as Rusyn.

Note on population: The difference values of population numbers in the table "Population statistic" and in the sections "Ethnicity" & "Religion" is caused by the use of various statistical methods.

=== Religion ===
Census 2021 (1+ %)
Religion	Number	Fraction
Roman Catholic Church	125	94.7%
None	3	2.27%
Not found out	2	1.52%
Total	132	

In year 2021 was 132 people by religion 125 from Roman Catholic Church, 3 from None, 2 from Not found out, 1 from Greek Catholic Church and 1 from Evangelical Church.
