= Rokytov pri Humennom =

- Municipality
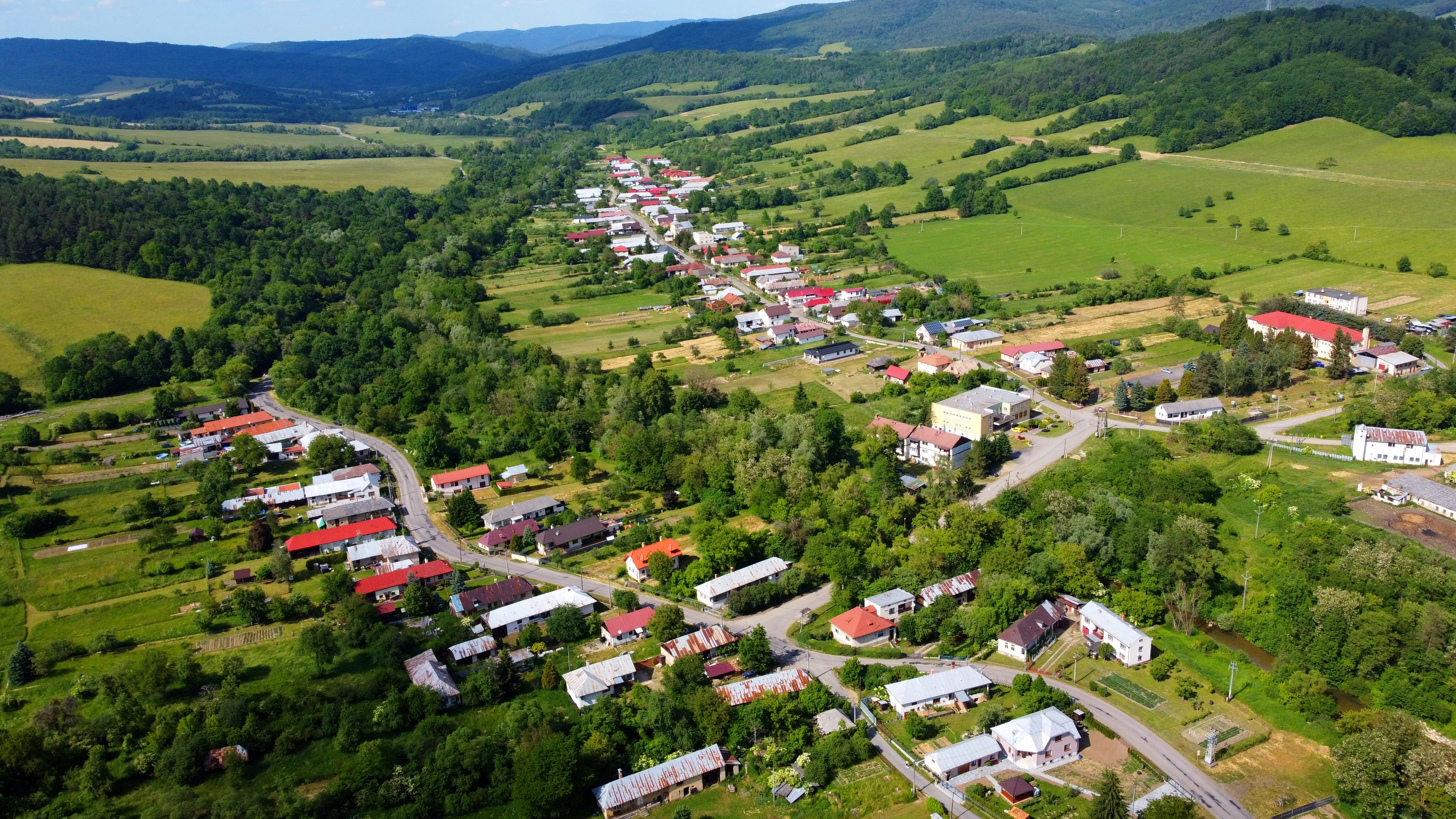

- Flag

- Location of Rokytov pri Humennom in the Prešov Region Location of Rokytov pri Humennom in Slovakia
- Coordinates: 49.10°N 21.99°E
- Country: Slovakia
- Region: Prešov Region
- District: Humenné District
- First mentioned: 1463

Area
  - Total: 25.68 km^{2} (9.92 sq mi)
- Elevation: 231 m (758 ft)

Population (2025)
  - Total: 283
- Time zone: UTC+1 (CET)
  - Summer (DST): UTC+2 (CEST)
- Postal code: 671 3
- Area code: +421 57
- Vehicle registration plate (until 2022): HE
- Website: www.rokytovprihumennom.sk

Rokytov pri Humennom is a village and municipality in Humenné District in the Prešov Region of north-east Slovakia.

== History ==
In historical records the village was first mentioned in 1463.

== Geography ==
The municipality lies at an altitude of 231 metres (758 ft) and covers an area of 25.68 km^{2} (9.92 sq mi) (2025).

== Population ==
Population statistic (10 years)
Year	1995	2005	2015	2025
Count	351	295	295	283
Difference		−15.95%	+0%	−4.06%

Population statistic
Year	2024	2025
Count	287	283
Difference		−1.39%

It has a population of 283 people (31 December 2025).

=== Ethnicity ===
Census 2021 (1+ %)
Ethnicity	Number	Fraction
Slovak	232	82.85%
Rusyn	116	41.42%
Ukrainian	8	2.85%
Not found out	6	2.14%
Czech	4	1.42%
Romani	3	1.07%
Total	280	

In year 2021 was 280 people by ethnicity 232 as Slovak, 116 as Rusyn, 8 as Ukrainian, 6 as Not found out, 4 as Czech, 3 as Romani, 1 as Russian and 1 as Polish.

Note on population: The difference values of population numbers in the table "Population statistic" and in the sections "Ethnicity" & "Religion" is caused by the use of various statistical methods.

=== Religion ===
Census 2021 (1+ %)
Religion	Number	Fraction
Greek Catholic Church	188	67.14%
Roman Catholic Church	61	21.79%
None	16	5.71%
Eastern Orthodox Church	6	2.14%
Not found out	5	1.79%
Total	280	

In year 2021 was 280 people by religion 188 from Greek Catholic Church, 61 from Roman Catholic Church, 16 from None, 6 from Eastern Orthodox Church, 5 from Not found out, 2 from Jehovah's Witnesses and 2 from Evangelical Church.
