= Košarovce =

- Municipality
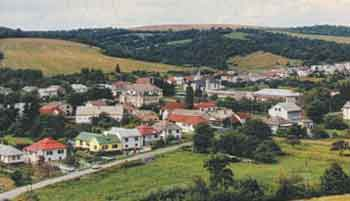

- Flag Coat of arms

- Location of Košarovce in the Prešov Region Location of Košarovce in Slovakia
- Coordinates: 49.05°N 21.78°E
- Country: Slovakia
- Region: Prešov Region
- District: Humenné District
- First mentioned: 1408

Area
  - Total: 8.00 km^{2} (3.09 sq mi)
- Elevation: 164 m (538 ft)

Population (2025)
  - Total: 596
- Time zone: UTC+1 (CET)
  - Summer (DST): UTC+2 (CEST)
- Postal code: 940 6
- Area code: +421 57
- Vehicle registration plate (until 2022): HE
- Website: www.kosarovce.sk

Košarovce is a village and municipality in Humenné District in the Prešov Region of north-east Slovakia.

== History ==
In historical records the village was first mentioned in 1408.

== Geography ==
The municipality lies at an altitude of 164 metres (538 ft) and covers an area of 8.00 km^{2} (3.09 sq mi) (2025).

== Population ==
Population statistic (10 years)
Year	1995	2005	2015	2025
Count	607	609	637	596
Difference		+0.32%	+4.59%	−6.43%

Population statistic
Year	2024	2025
Count	581	596
Difference		+2.58%

It has a population of 596 people (31 December 2025).

=== Ethnicity ===
Census 2021 (1+ %)
Ethnicity	Number	Fraction
Slovak	614	99.03%
Rusyn	11	1.77%
Total	620	

In year 2021 was 620 people by ethnicity 614 as Slovak, 11 as Rusyn, 6 as Czech, 3 as Not found out, 1 as Ukrainian, 1 as Italian, 1 as French, 1 as Croatian and 1 as Bulgarian.

Note on population: The difference values of population numbers in the table "Population statistic" and in the sections "Ethnicity" & "Religion" is caused by the use of various statistical methods.

=== Religion ===
Census 2021 (1+ %)
Religion	Number	Fraction
Roman Catholic Church	553	89.19%
Greek Catholic Church	34	5.48%
None	25	4.03%
Total	620	

In year 2021 was 620 people by religion 553 from Roman Catholic Church, 34 from Greek Catholic Church, 25 from None, 2 from Eastern Orthodox Church, 1 from Other and not ascertained christian church, 1 from Not found out, 1 from Other, 1 from Evangelical Church, 1 from Buddhism and 1 from Ad hoc movements.
