= Slovenské Krivé =

- Municipality
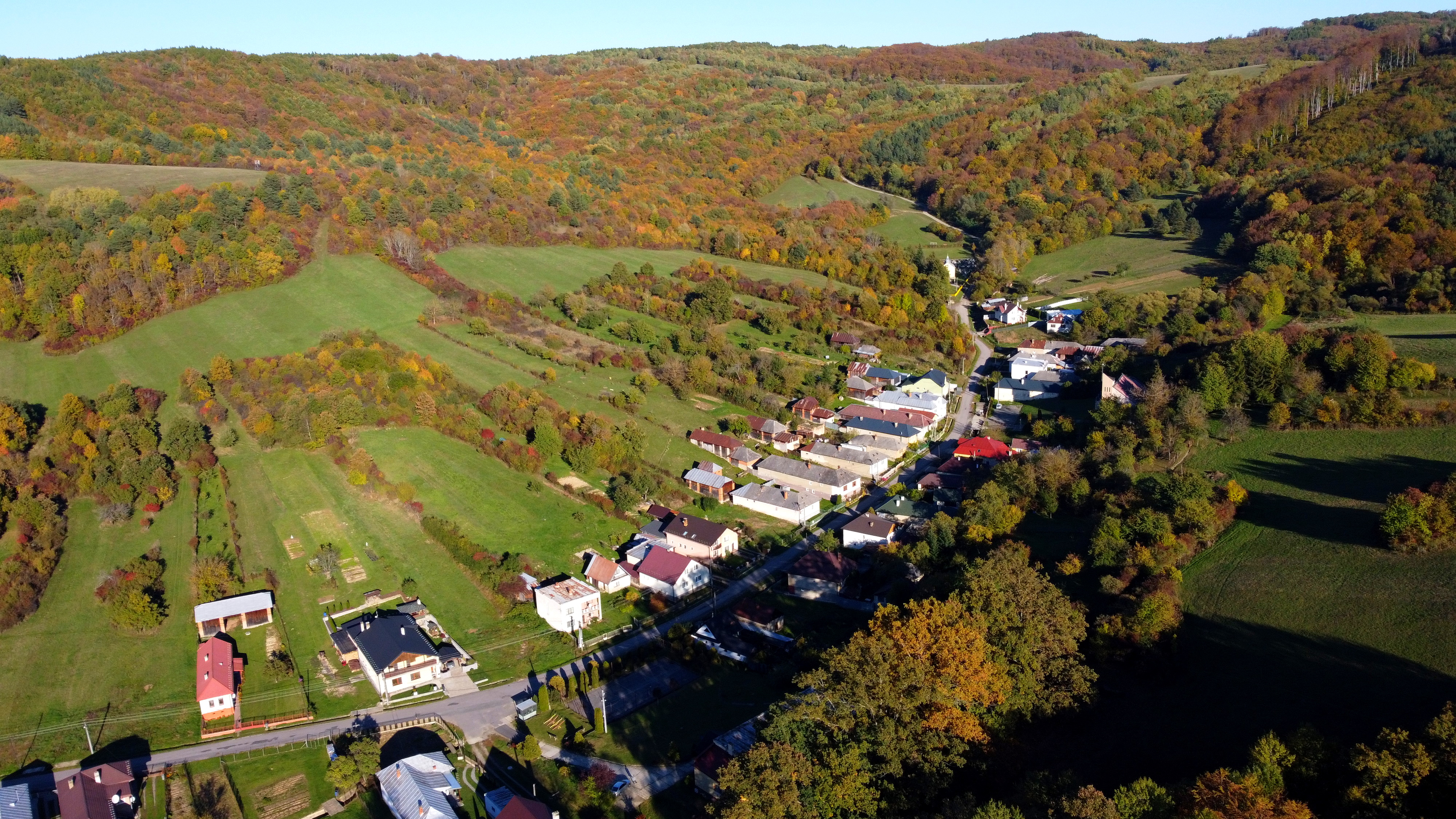

- Flag

- Location of Slovenské Krivé in the Prešov Region Location of Slovenské Krivé in Slovakia
- Coordinates: 49.07°N 22.02°E
- Country: Slovakia
- Region: Prešov Region
- District: Humenné District
- First mentioned: 1478

Area
  - Total: 6.39 km^{2} (2.47 sq mi)
- Elevation: 246 m (807 ft)

Population (2025)
  - Total: 118
- Time zone: UTC+1 (CET)
  - Summer (DST): UTC+2 (CEST)
- Postal code: 671 3
- Area code: +421 57
- Vehicle registration plate (until 2022): HE
- Website: www.slovenskekrive.sk

Slovenské Krivé (Hungarian: Görbény) is a village and municipality in Humenné District in the Prešov Region of north-east Slovakia.

== History ==
In historical records the village was first mentioned in 1478.

== Geography ==
The municipality lies at an altitude of 246 metres (807 ft) and covers an area of 6.39 km^{2} (2.47 sq mi) (2025).

== Population ==
Population statistic (10 years)
Year	1995	2005	2015	2025
Count	130	141	123	118
Difference		+8.46%	−12.76%	−4.06%

Population statistic
Year	2024	2025
Count	123	118
Difference		−4.06%

It has a population of 118 people (31 December 2025).

=== Ethnicity ===
Census 2021 (1+ %)
Ethnicity	Number	Fraction
Slovak	116	97.47%
Rusyn	4	3.36%
Total	119	

In year 2021 was 119 people by ethnicity 116 as Slovak, 4 as Rusyn and 1 as Not found out.

Note on population: The difference values of population numbers in the table "Population statistic" and in the sections "Ethnicity" & "Religion" is caused by the use of various statistical methods.

=== Religion ===
Census 2021 (1+ %)
Religion	Number	Fraction
Roman Catholic Church	108	90.76%
Greek Catholic Church	6	5.04%
None	3	2.52%
Total	119	

In year 2021 was 119 people by religion 108 from Roman Catholic Church, 6 from Greek Catholic Church, 3 from None, 1 from Eastern Orthodox Church and 1 from Not found out.
