= Závada, Humenné District =

Závada
- Municipality
- Flag

- Location of Závada in the Prešov Region Location of Závada in Slovakia
- Coordinates: 49.17°N 21.79°E
- Country: Slovakia
- Region: Prešov Region
- District: Humenné District
- First mentioned: 1454

Area
  - Total: 9.03 km^{2} (3.49 sq mi)
- Elevation: 300 m (980 ft)

Population (2025)
  - Total: 70
- Time zone: UTC+1 (CET)
  - Summer (DST): UTC+2 (CEST)
- Postal code: 940 8
- Area code: +421 57
- Vehicle registration plate (until 2022): HE
- Website: obeczavada.webnode.sk

Závada (Rusyn: Завада) is a village and municipality in Humenné District in the Prešov Region of north-east Slovakia.

== History ==
In historical records the village was first mentioned in 1454.

== Geography ==
The municipality lies at an altitude of 300 metres (980 ft) and covers an area of 9.03 km^{2} (3.49 sq mi) (2025).

== Population ==
Population statistic (10 years)
Year	1995	2005	2015	2025
Count	92	74	71	70
Difference		−19.56%	−4.05%	−1.40%

Population statistic
Year	2024	2025
Count	73	70
Difference		−4.10%

It has a population of 70 people (31 December 2025).

=== Ethnicity ===
Census 2021 (1+ %)
Ethnicity	Number	Fraction
Rusyn	52	80%
Slovak	25	38.46%
Russian	1	1.53%
Not found out	1	1.53%
Total	65	

In year 2021 was 65 people by ethnicity 52 as Rusyn, 25 as Slovak, 1 as Russian and 1 as Not found out.

Note on population: The difference values of population numbers in the table "Population statistic" and in the sections "Ethnicity" & "Religion" is caused by the use of various statistical methods.

=== Religion ===
Census 2021 (1+ %)
Religion	Number	Fraction
Greek Catholic Church	57	87.69%
Roman Catholic Church	5	7.69%
Eastern Orthodox Church	1	1.54%
Evangelical Church	1	1.54%
None	1	1.54%
Total	65	

In year 2021 was 65 people by religion 57 from Greek Catholic Church, 5 from Roman Catholic Church, 1 from Eastern Orthodox Church, 1 from Evangelical Church and 1 from None.
