= Hrabovec nad Laborcom =

- Municipality
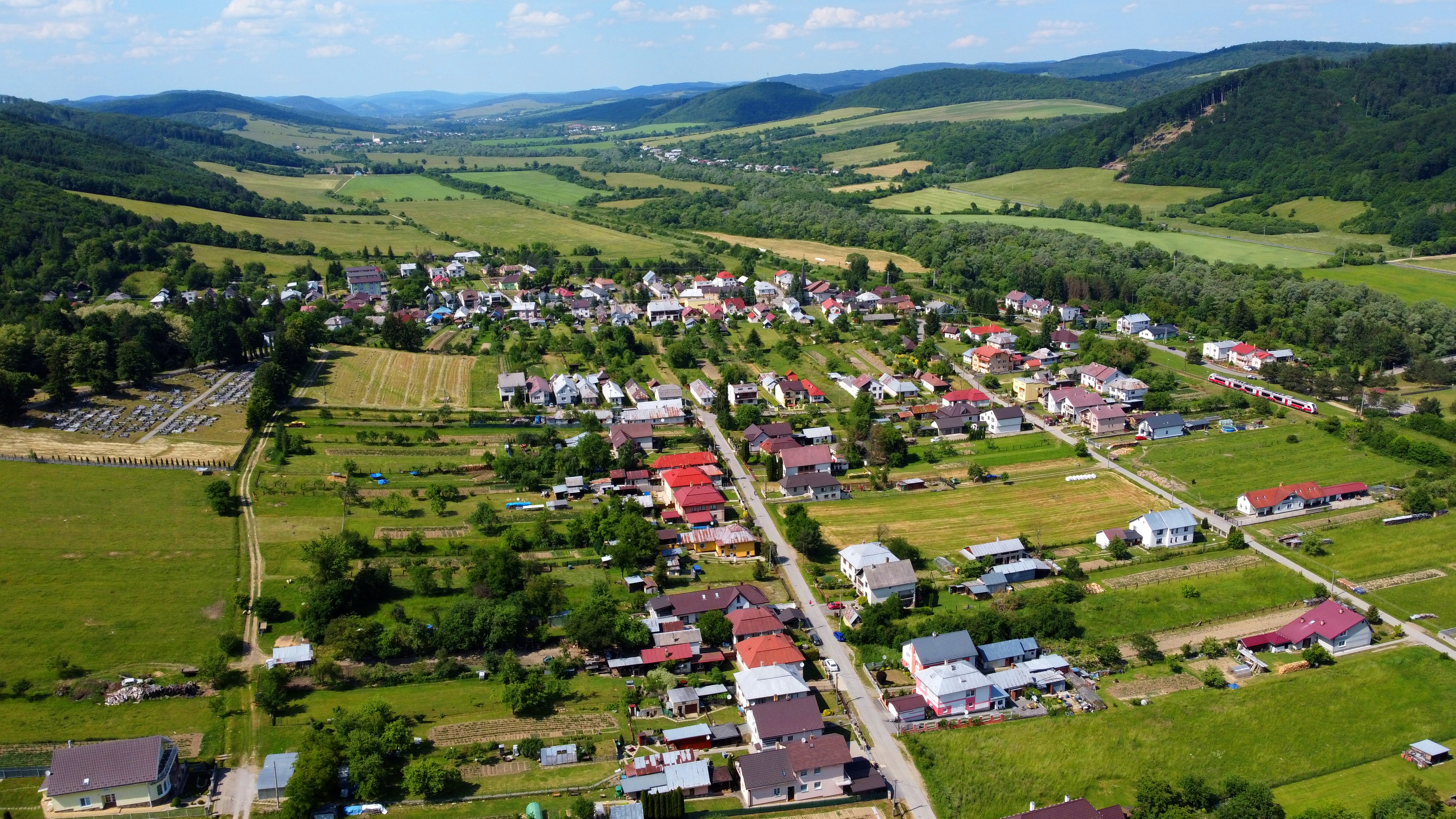

- Flag

- Location of Hrabovec nad Laborcom in the Prešov Region Location of Hrabovec nad Laborcom in Slovakia
- Coordinates: 49.10°N 21.95°E
- Country: Slovakia
- Region: Prešov Region
- District: Humenné District
- First mentioned: 1463

Area
  - Total: 13.53 km^{2} (5.22 sq mi)
- Elevation: 211 m (692 ft)

Population (2025)
  - Total: 497
- Time zone: UTC+1 (CET)
  - Summer (DST): UTC+2 (CEST)
- Postal code: 670 1
- Area code: +421 57
- Vehicle registration plate (until 2022): HE
- Website: hrabovecnadlaborcom.sk

Hrabovec nad Laborcom is a village and municipality in Humenné District in the Prešov Region of north-east Slovakia.

== History ==
In historical records the village was first mentioned in 1463.

== Geography ==
The municipality lies at an altitude of 211 metres (692 ft) and covers an area of 13.53 km^{2} (5.22 sq mi) (2025).

== Population ==
Population statistic (10 years)
| Year | 1995 | 2005 | 2015 | 2025 |
|---|---|---|---|---|
| Count | 574 | 584 | 535 | 497 |
| Difference | | +1.74% | −8.39% | −7.10% |

Population statistic
| Year | 2024 | 2025 |
|---|---|---|
| Count | 493 | 497 |
| Difference | | +0.81% |

It has a population of 497 people (31 December 2025).

=== Ethnicity ===
Census 2021 (1+ %)
| Ethnicity | Number | Fraction |
|---|---|---|
| Slovak | 492 | 98.2% |
| Rusyn | 14 | 2.79% |
| Total | 501 | |

In year 2021 was 501 people by ethnicity 492 as Slovak, 14 as Rusyn, 5 as Ukrainian, 2 as Not found out, 2 as Croatian, 1 as Czech and 1 as Russian.

Note on population: The difference values of population numbers in the table "Population statistic" and in the sections "Ethnicity" & "Religion" is caused by the use of various statistical methods.

=== Religion ===
Census 2021 (1+ %)
| Religion | Number | Fraction |
|---|---|---|
| Roman Catholic Church | 458 | 91.42% |
| Greek Catholic Church | 26 | 5.19% |
| None | 14 | 2.79% |
| Total | 501 | |

In year 2021 was 501 people by religion 458 from Roman Catholic Church, 26 from Greek Catholic Church, 14 from None, 1 from Eastern Orthodox Church, 1 from Other and 1 from Ad hoc movements.
