= Veľopolie =

- Municipality
- Flag

- Location of Veľopolie in the Prešov Region Location of Veľopolie in Slovakia
- Coordinates: 49.00°N 21.95°E
- Country: Slovakia
- Region: Prešov Region
- District: Humenné District
- First mentioned: 1620

Area
  - Total: 7.86 km^{2} (3.03 sq mi)
- Elevation: 179 m (587 ft)

Population (2025)
  - Total: 380
- Time zone: UTC+1 (CET)
  - Summer (DST): UTC+2 (CEST)
- Postal code: 673 1
- Area code: +421 57
- Vehicle registration plate (until 2022): HE
- Website: www.velopolie.sk

Veľopolie is a village and municipality in Humenné District in the Prešov Region of north-east Slovakia.

== History ==
In historical records the village was first mentioned in 1620.

== Geography ==
The municipality lies at an altitude of 179 metres (587 ft) and covers an area of 7.86 km^{2} (3.03 sq mi) (2025).

== Population ==
Population statistic (10 years)
Year	1995	2005	2015	2025
Count	313	319	366	380
Difference		+1.91%	+14.73%	+3.82%

Population statistic
Year	2024	2025
Count	377	380
Difference		+0.79%

It has a population of 380 people (31 December 2025).

=== Ethnicity ===
Census 2021 (1+ %)
Ethnicity	Number	Fraction
Slovak	356	98.34%
Rusyn	8	2.2%
Total	362	

In year 2021 was 362 people by ethnicity 356 as Slovak, 8 as Rusyn, 3 as Ukrainian and 2 as Czech.

Note on population: The difference values of population numbers in the table "Population statistic" and in the sections "Ethnicity" & "Religion" is caused by the use of various statistical methods.

=== Religion ===
Census 2021 (1+ %)
Religion	Number	Fraction
Roman Catholic Church	326	90.06%
None	21	5.8%
Greek Catholic Church	10	2.76%
Total	362	

In year 2021 was 362 people by religion 326 from Roman Catholic Church, 21 from None, 10 from Greek Catholic Church, 3 from Jehovah's Witnesses and 2 from Eastern Orthodox Church.
