= Vyšný Hrušov =

- Municipality
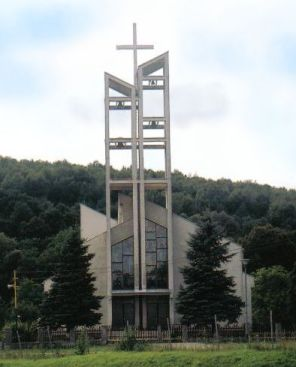

- Flag

- Location of Vyšný Hrušov in the Prešov Region Location of Vyšný Hrušov in Slovakia
- Coordinates: 49.00°N 22.00°E
- Country: Slovakia
- Region: Prešov Region
- District: Humenné District
- First mentioned: 1543

Area
  - Total: 11.36 km^{2} (4.39 sq mi)
- Elevation: 185 m (607 ft)

Population (2025)
  - Total: 468
- Time zone: UTC+1 (CET)
  - Summer (DST): UTC+2 (CEST)
- Postal code: 673 2
- Area code: +421 57
- Vehicle registration plate (until 2022): HE
- Website: www.vysnyhrusov.sk

Vyšný Hrušov is a village and municipality in Humenné District in the Prešov Region of north-east Slovakia, on the southern edge of the Laborec Highlands.

== History ==
In historical records the village was first mentioned in 1543.

== Geography ==
The municipality lies at an altitude of 185 metres (607 ft) and covers an area of 11.36 km^{2} (4.39 sq mi) (2025).

== Population ==
Population statistic (10 years)
Year	1995	2005	2015	2025
Count	442	464	487	468
Difference		+4.97%	+4.95%	−3.90%

Population statistic
Year	2024	2025
Count	459	468
Difference		+1.96%

It has a population of 468 people (31 December 2025).

=== Ethnicity ===
Census 2021 (1+ %)
Ethnicity	Number	Fraction
Slovak	455	93.62%
Romani	26	5.34%
Not found out	22	4.52%
Rusyn	6	1.23%
Total	486	

In year 2021 was 486 people by ethnicity 455 as Slovak, 26 as Romani, 22 as Not found out, 6 as Rusyn and 1 as Ukrainian.

Note on population: The difference values of population numbers in the table "Population statistic" and in the sections "Ethnicity" & "Religion" is caused by the use of various statistical methods.

=== Religion ===
Census 2021 (1+ %)
Religion	Number	Fraction
Roman Catholic Church	395	81.28%
None	35	7.2%
Greek Catholic Church	30	6.17%
Not found out	18	3.7%
Total	486	

In year 2021 was 486 people by religion 395 from Roman Catholic Church, 35 from None, 30 from Greek Catholic Church, 18 from Not found out, 3 from Apostolic Church, 1 from Calvinist Church, 1 from Eastern Orthodox Church, 1 from Jehovah's Witnesses, 1 from Evangelical Church and 1 from Ad hoc movements.
