= Pakostov =

- Municipality
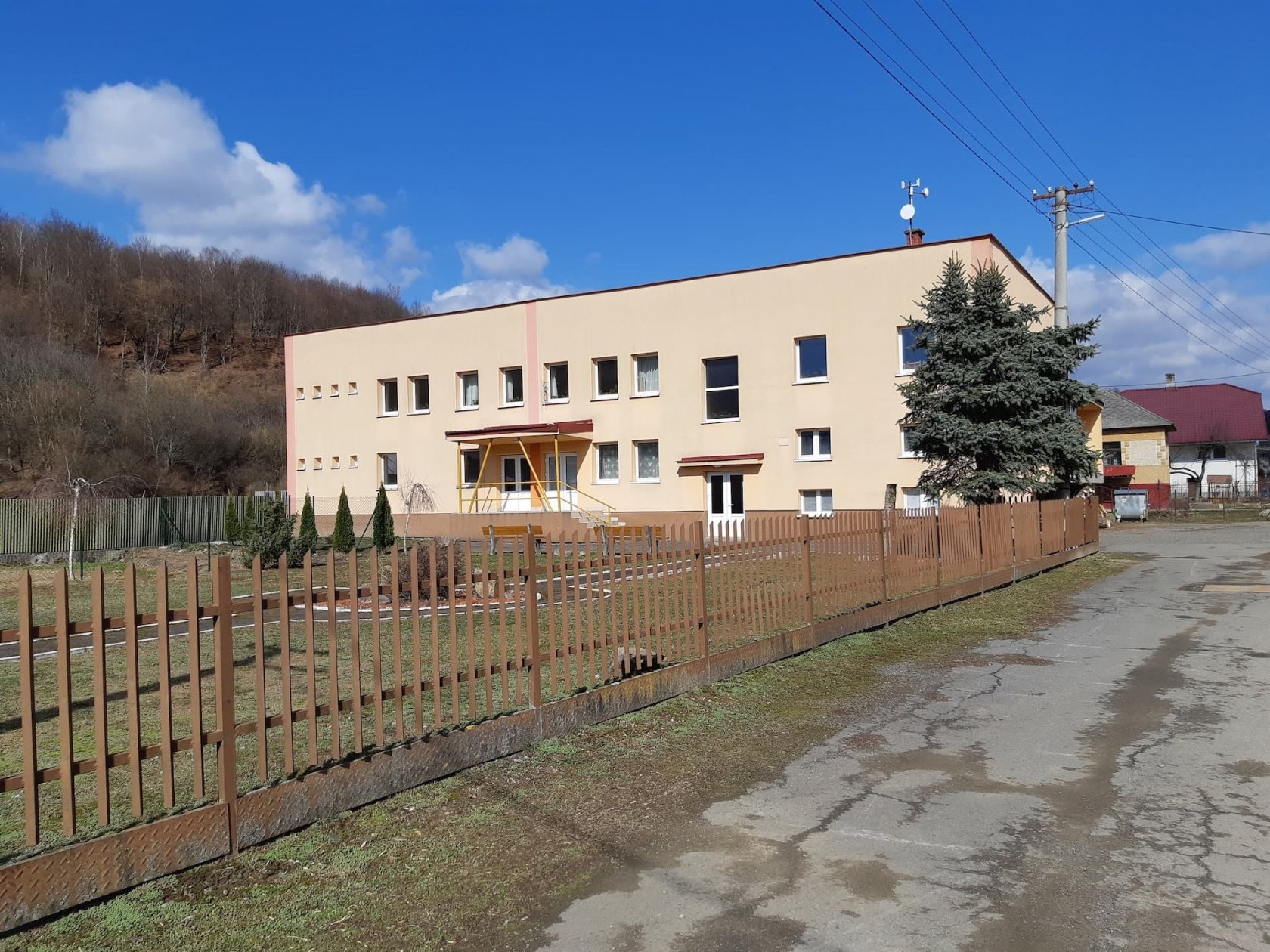

- Flag

- Location of Pakostov in the Prešov Region Location of Pakostov in Slovakia
- Coordinates: 49.10°N 21.83°E
- Country: Slovakia
- Region: Prešov Region
- District: Humenné District
- First mentioned: 1567

Area
  - Total: 14.37 km^{2} (5.55 sq mi)
- Elevation: 188 m (617 ft)

Population (2025)
  - Total: 431
- Time zone: UTC+1 (CET)
  - Summer (DST): UTC+2 (CEST)
- Postal code: 940 7
- Area code: +421 57
- Vehicle registration plate (until 2022): HE
- Website: www.pakostov.sk

Pakostov is a village and municipality in Humenné District in the Prešov Region of north-east Slovakia.

== History ==
In historical records the village was first mentioned in 1567.

== Geography ==
The municipality lies at an altitude of 188 metres (617 ft) and covers an area of 14.37 km^{2} (5.55 sq mi) (2025).

== Population ==
Population statistic (10 years)
Year	1995	2005	2015	2025
Count	507	480	458	431
Difference		−5.32%	−4.58%	−5.89%

Population statistic
Year	2024	2025
Count	434	431
Difference		−0.69%

It has a population of 431 people (31 December 2025).

=== Ethnicity ===
Census 2021 (1+ %)
Ethnicity	Number	Fraction
Slovak	409	94.89%
Rusyn	25	5.8%
Not found out	9	2.08%
Total	431	

In year 2021 was 431 people by ethnicity 409 as Slovak, 25 as Rusyn, 9 as Not found out, 4 as Czech, 3 as Ukrainian and 1 as Italian.

Note on population: The difference values of population numbers in the table "Population statistic" and in the sections "Ethnicity" & "Religion" is caused by the use of various statistical methods.

=== Religion ===
Census 2021 (1+ %)
Religion	Number	Fraction
Roman Catholic Church	296	68.68%
Greek Catholic Church	112	25.99%
None	11	2.55%
Not found out	7	1.62%
Total	431	

In year 2021 was 431 people by religion 296 from Roman Catholic Church, 112 from Greek Catholic Church, 11 from None, 7 from Not found out, 3 from Other and not ascertained christian church, 1 from Evangelical Church and 1 from Ad hoc movements.
