= Brestov, Humenné District =

Brestov
- Municipality
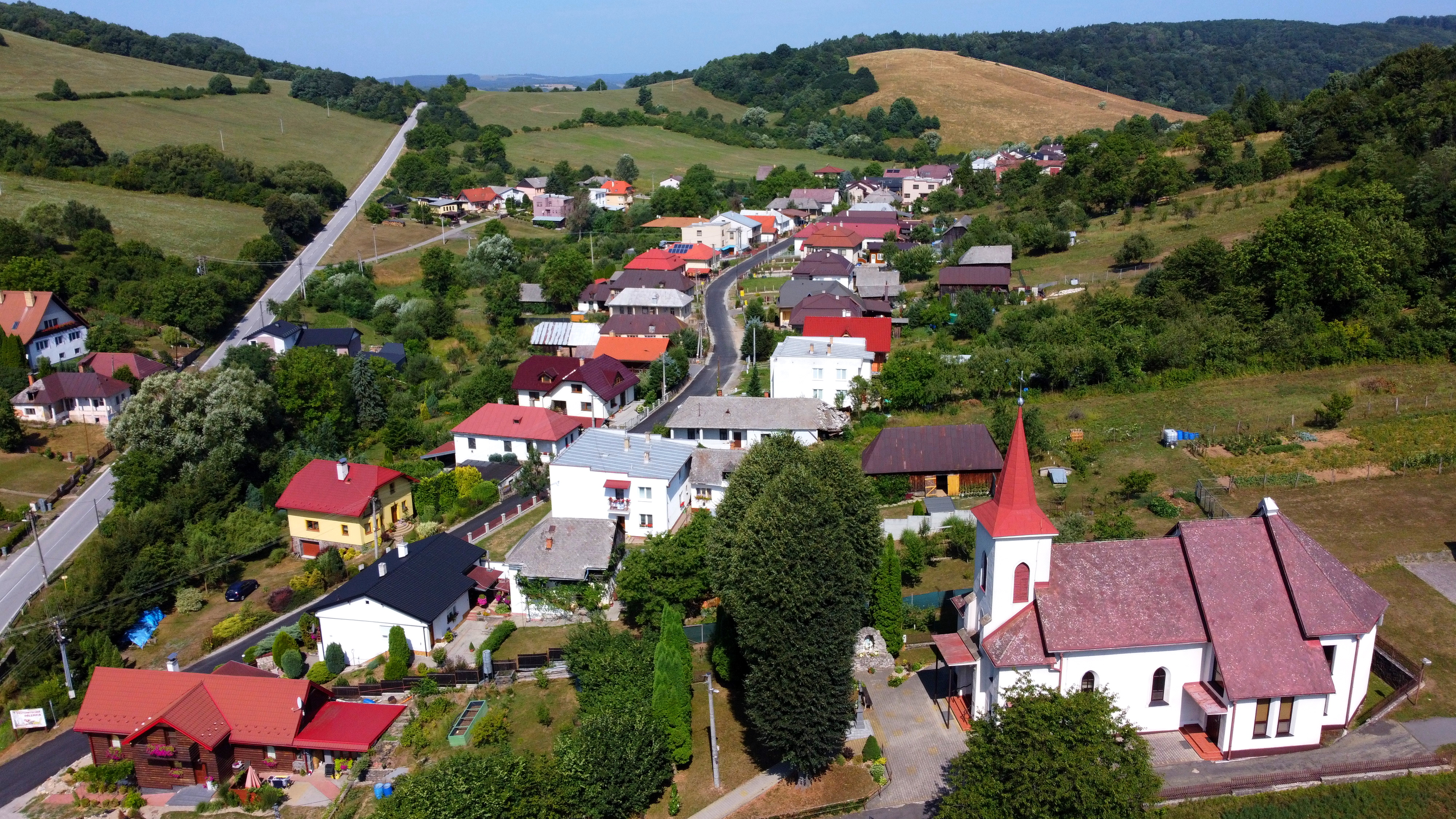

- Flag

- Location of Brestov in the Prešov Region Location of Brestov in Slovakia
- Coordinates: 48.97°N 21.89°E
- Country: Slovakia
- Region: Prešov Region
- District: Humenné District
- First mentioned: 1567

Area
  - Total: 10.10 km^{2} (3.90 sq mi)
- Elevation: 212 m (696 ft)

Population (2025)
  - Total: 564
- Time zone: UTC+1 (CET)
  - Summer (DST): UTC+2 (CEST)
- Postal code: 660 1
- Area code: +421 57
- Vehicle registration plate (until 2022): HE
- Website: www.obecbrestov.sk

Brestov (Hungarian: Alsóberek, until 1899: Homonna-Bresztó) is a village and municipality in Humenné District in the Prešov Region of north-east Slovakia. The mayor is Ľudmila Nováková (Independent).

== History ==
In historical records the village was first mentioned in 1567.

== Geography ==
The municipality lies at an altitude of 212 metres (696 ft) and covers an area of 10.10 km^{2} (3.90 sq mi) (2025).

== Population ==
Population statistic (10 years)
Year	1995	2005	2015	2025
Count	503	541	598	564
Difference		+7.55%	+10.53%	−5.68%

Population statistic
Year	2024	2025
Count	569	564
Difference		−0.87%

It has a population of 564 people (31 December 2025).

=== Ethnicity ===
Census 2021 (1+ %)
Ethnicity	Number	Fraction
Slovak	576	96.8%
Rusyn	33	5.54%
Total	595	

In year 2021 was 595 people by ethnicity 576 as Slovak, 33 as Rusyn, 5 as Romani, 4 as Ukrainian, 3 as Other, 2 as Czech, 2 as Not found out, 1 as Russian, 1 as Romanian, 1 as Polish and 1 as Moravian.

Note on population: The difference values of population numbers in the table "Population statistic" and in the sections "Ethnicity" & "Religion" is caused by the use of various statistical methods.

=== Religion ===
Census 2021 (1+ %)
Religion	Number	Fraction
Roman Catholic Church	456	76.64%
Greek Catholic Church	69	11.6%
None	52	8.74%
Eastern Orthodox Church	10	1.68%
Total	595	

In year 2021 was 595 people by religion 456 from Roman Catholic Church, 69 from Greek Catholic Church, 52 from None, 10 from Eastern Orthodox Church, 4 from Not found out, 2 from Apostolic Church, 1 from Buddhism and 1 from Ad hoc movements.

== Genealogical resources ==
The records for genealogical research are available at the state archive "Statny Archiv in Presov, Slovakia"

- Roman Catholic church records (births/marriages/deaths): 1802-1911 (parish B)
- Greek Catholic church records (births/marriages/deaths): 1768-1946 (parish B)

== See also ==
- List of municipalities and towns in Slovakia
