= Rohožník, Humenné District =

Rohožník
- Municipality
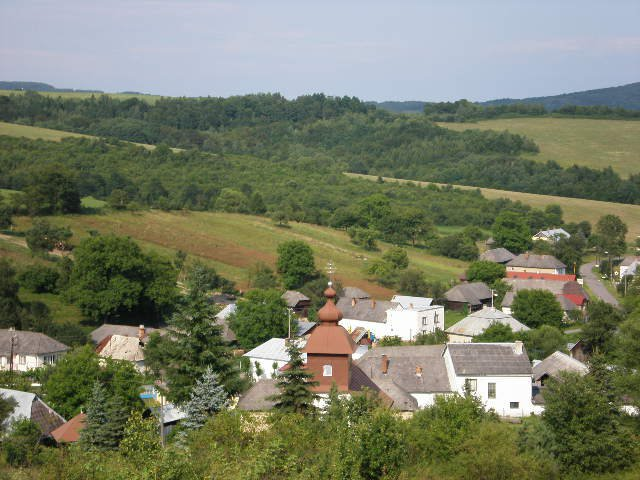

- Flag

- Location of Rohožník in the Prešov Region Location of Rohožník in Slovakia
- Coordinates: 49.11°N 21.76°E
- Country: Slovakia
- Region: Prešov Region
- District: Humenné District
- First mentioned: 1454

Area
  - Total: 3.59 km^{2} (1.39 sq mi)
- Elevation: 226 m (741 ft)

Population (2025)
  - Total: 37
- Time zone: UTC+1 (CET)
  - Summer (DST): UTC+2 (CEST)
- Postal code: 940 7
- Area code: +421 57
- Vehicle registration plate (until 2022): HE
- Website: rohoznik.estranky.sk

Rohožník is a small village and municipality in Humenné District in the Prešov Region of north-east Slovakia.

== History ==
In historical records the village was first mentioned in 1454.

== Geography ==
The municipality lies at an altitude of 226 metres (741 ft) and covers an area of 3.59 km^{2} (1.39 sq mi) (2025).

== Population ==
Population statistic (10 years)
Year	1995	2005	2015	2025
Count	60	27	25	37
Difference		−55%	−7.40%	+48%

Population statistic
Year	2024	2025
Count	37	37
Difference		+0%

It has a population of 37 people (31 December 2025).

=== Ethnicity ===
Census 2021 (1+ %)
Ethnicity	Number	Fraction
Slovak	32	72.72%
Rusyn	20	45.45%
Not found out	1	2.27%
Total	44	

In year 2021 was 44 people by ethnicity 32 as Slovak, 20 as Rusyn and 1 as Not found out.

Note on population: The difference values of population numbers in the table "Population statistic" and in the sections "Ethnicity" & "Religion" is caused by the use of various statistical methods.

=== Religion ===
Census 2021 (1+ %)
Religion	Number	Fraction
Greek Catholic Church	34	77.27%
Roman Catholic Church	9	20.45%
Not found out	1	2.27%
Total	44	

In year 2021 was 44 people by religion 34 from Greek Catholic Church, 9 from Roman Catholic Church and 1 from Not found out.
