= Adidovce =

- Municipality
- Flag

- Location of Adidovce in the Prešov Region Location of Adidovce in Slovakia
- Coordinates: 49.02°N 22.05°E
- Country: Slovakia
- Region: Prešov Region
- District: Humenné District
- First mentioned: 1568

Government
  - Mayor: Lenka Hudáková (Voice – Social Democracy)

Area
  - Total: 20.76 km^{2} (8.02 sq mi)
- Elevation: 203 m (666 ft)

Population (2025)
  - Total: 231
- Time zone: UTC+1 (CET)
  - Summer (DST): UTC+2 (CEST)
- Postal code: 673 2
- Area code: +421 57
- Vehicle registration plate (until 2022): HE
- Website: obecadidovce.sk

Adidovce (Hungarian: Agyidóc, Rusyn: Адїдовцї) is a village and municipality in the Humenné District in the Prešov Region of north-east Slovakia.

== History ==
In historical records the village was first mentioned in 1568.

== Geography ==
The municipality lies at an altitude of 203 metres (666 ft) and covers an area of 20.76 km^{2} (8.02 sq mi) (2025).

== Population ==
Population statistic (10 years)
Year	1995	2005	2015	2025
Count	228	218	211	231
Difference		−4.38%	−3.21%	+9.47%

Population statistic
Year	2024	2025
Count	234	231
Difference		−1.28%

It has a population of 231 people (31 December 2025).

=== Ethnicity ===
Census 2021 (1+ %)
Ethnicity	Number	Fraction
Slovak	216	95.15%
Not found out	11	4.84%
Rusyn	9	3.96%
Total	227	

In year 2021 was 227 people by ethnicity 216 as Slovak, 11 as Not found out, 9 as Rusyn and 1 as Czech.

Note on population: The difference values of population numbers in the table "Population statistic" and in the sections "Ethnicity" & "Religion" is caused by the use of various statistical methods.

=== Religion ===
Census 2021 (1+ %)
Religion	Number	Fraction
Roman Catholic Church	126	55.51%
Greek Catholic Church	49	21.59%
None	26	11.45%
Jehovah's Witnesses	11	4.85%
Not found out	9	3.96%
Total	227	

In year 2021 was 227 people by religion 126 from Roman Catholic Church, 49 from Greek Catholic Church, 26 from None, 11 from Jehovah's Witnesses, 9 from Not found out, 2 from Calvinist Church, 2 from Apostolic Church, 1 from Christian Congregations in Slovakia and 1 from Other.

== Genealogical resources ==
The records for genealogical research are available at the state archive in Prešov (Slovak: Štátny archív v Prešove).

- Roman Catholic church records (births/marriages/deaths): 1792-1895
- Greek Catholic church records (births/marriages/deaths): 1819-1946
- Census records 1869 of Adidovce are available at the state archive.

== See also ==
- List of municipalities and towns in Slovakia
