= Turcovce =

- Municipality
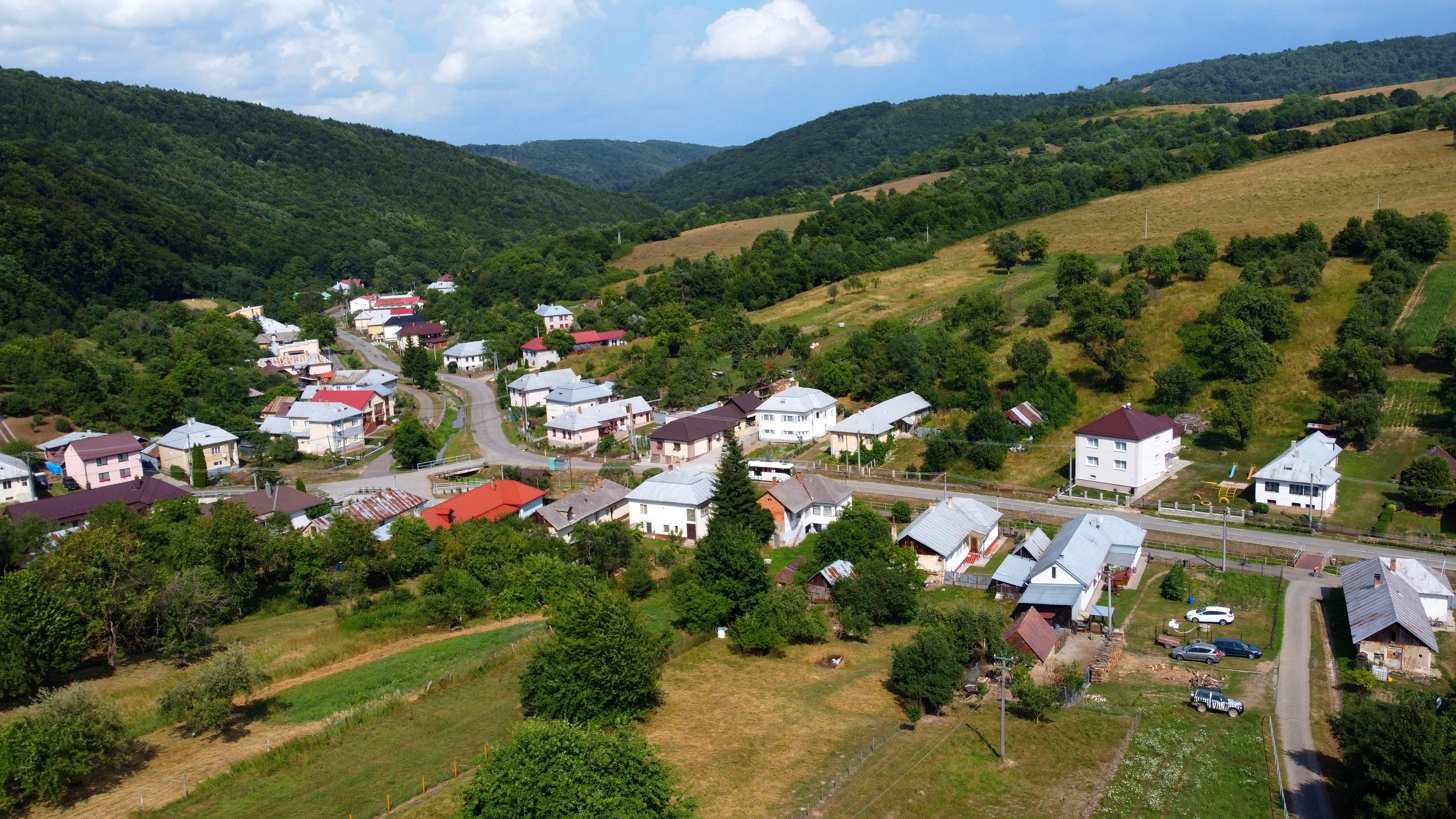

- Flag Coat of arms

- Location of Turcovce in the Prešov Region Location of Turcovce in Slovakia
- Coordinates: 49.05°N 21.85°E
- Country: Slovakia
- Region: Prešov Region
- District: Humenné District
- First mentioned: 1557

Area
  - Total: 10.00 km^{2} (3.86 sq mi)
- Elevation: 226 m (741 ft)

Population (2025)
  - Total: 306
- Time zone: UTC+1 (CET)
  - Summer (DST): UTC+2 (CEST)
- Postal code: 672 3
- Area code: +421 57
- Vehicle registration plate (until 2022): HE
- Website: www.turcovce.dcom.sk

Turcovce is a village and municipality in Humenné District in the Prešov Region of north-east Slovakia.

== History ==
In historical records the village was first mentioned in 1557.

== Geography ==
The municipality lies at an altitude of 226 metres (741 ft) and covers an area of 10.00 km^{2} (3.86 sq mi) (2025).

== Population ==
Population statistic (10 years)
Year	1995	2005	2015	2025
Count	368	346	302	306
Difference		−5.97%	−12.71%	+1.32%

Population statistic
Year	2024	2025
Count	305	306
Difference		+0.32%

It has a population of 306 people (31 December 2025).

=== Ethnicity ===
Census 2021 (1+ %)
Ethnicity	Number	Fraction
Slovak	298	99%
Not found out	8	2.65%
Total	301	

In year 2021 was 301 people by ethnicity 298 as Slovak, 8 as Not found out, 2 as Rusyn, 1 as Romani and 1 as Other.

Note on population: The difference values of population numbers in the table "Population statistic" and in the sections "Ethnicity" & "Religion" is caused by the use of various statistical methods.

=== Religion ===
Census 2021 (1+ %)
Religion	Number	Fraction
Roman Catholic Church	280	93.02%
Greek Catholic Church	11	3.65%
None	4	1.33%
Not found out	3	1%
Total	301	

In year 2021 was 301 people by religion 280 from Roman Catholic Church, 11 from Greek Catholic Church, 4 from None, 3 from Not found out, 2 from Eastern Orthodox Church and 1 from Ad hoc movements.
