= Dedačov =

- Municipality
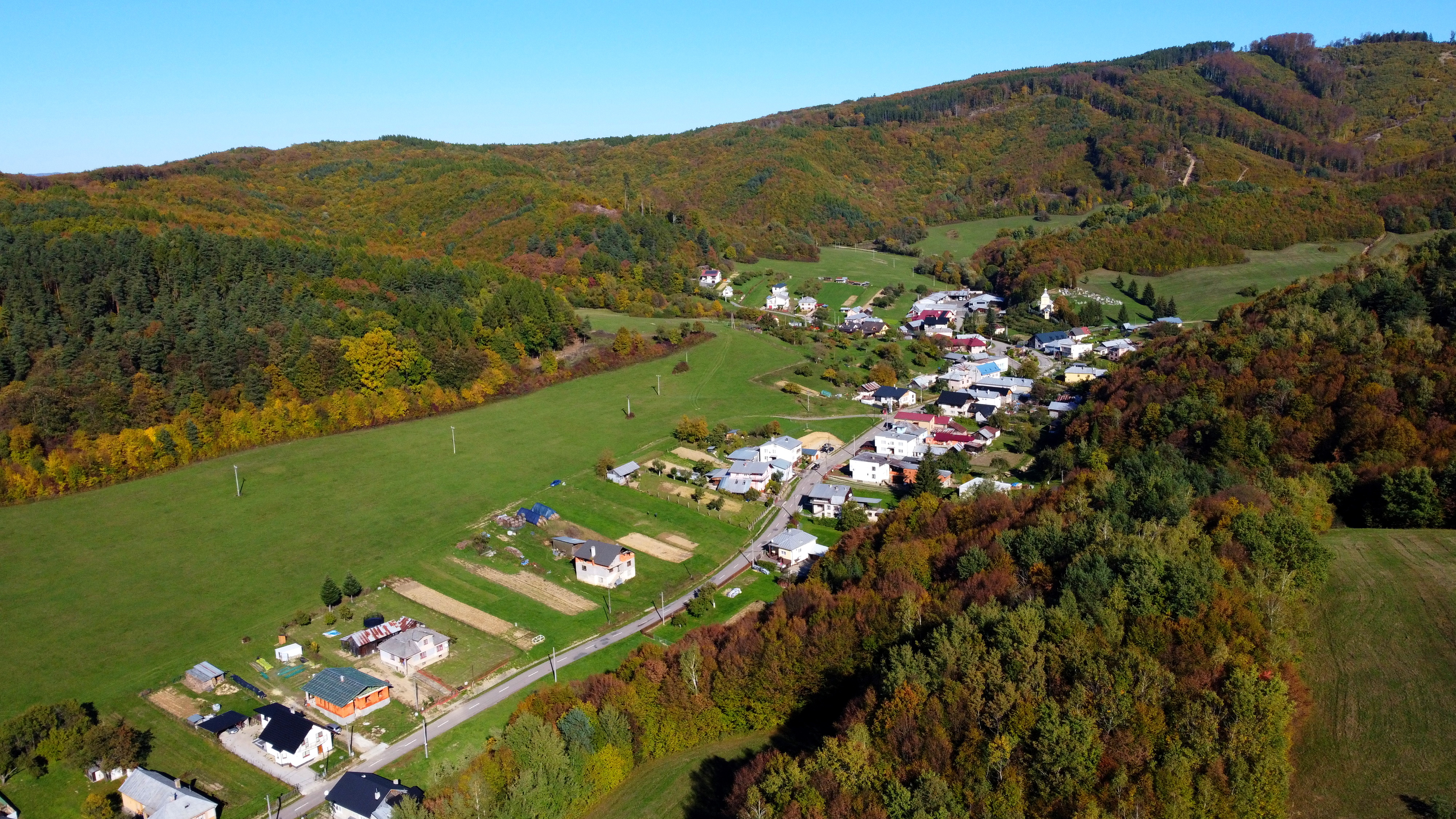

- Flag

- Location of Dedačov in the Prešov Region Location of Dedačov in Slovakia
- Coordinates: 49.03°N 21.98°E
- Country: Slovakia
- Region: Prešov Region
- District: Humenné District
- First mentioned: 1543

Area
  - Total: 5.74 km^{2} (2.22 sq mi)
- Elevation: 209 m (686 ft)

Population (2025)
  - Total: 150
- Time zone: UTC+1 (CET)
  - Summer (DST): UTC+2 (CEST)
- Postal code: 671 2
- Area code: +421 57
- Vehicle registration plate (until 2022): HE
- Website: www.dedacov.sk

Dedačov is a village and municipality in Humenné District in the Prešov Region of north-east Slovakia.

== History ==
In historical records, the village was first mentioned in 1543.

== Geography ==
The municipality lies at an altitude of 209 metres (686 ft) and covers an area of 5.74 km^{2} (2.22 sq mi) (2025).

== Population ==
Population statistic (10 years)
Year	1995	2005	2015	2025
Count	156	174	164	150
Difference		+11.53%	−5.74%	−8.53%

Population statistic
Year	2024	2025
Count	156	150
Difference		−3.84%

It has a population of 150 people (31 December 2025).

=== Ethnic composition ===
Census 2021 (1+ %)
Ethnicity	Number	Fraction
Slovak	158	99.37%
Rusyn	11	6.91%
Not found out	6	3.77%
Total	159	

In year 2021 was 159 people by ethnicity 158 as Slovak, 11 as Rusyn and 6 as Not found out.

Note on population: The difference values of population numbers in the table "Population statistic" and in the sections "Ethnicity" & "Religion" is caused by the use of various statistical methods.

=== Religion ===
Census 2021 (1+ %)
Religion	Number	Fraction
Roman Catholic Church	89	55.97%
Greek Catholic Church	60	37.74%
None	6	3.77%
Total	159	

In year 2021 was 159 people by religion 89 from Roman Catholic Church, 60 from Greek Catholic Church, 6 from None, 1 from Eastern Orthodox Church, 1 from Not found out, 1 from Other and 1 from Buddhism.
