= Vyšná Sitnica =

- Municipality
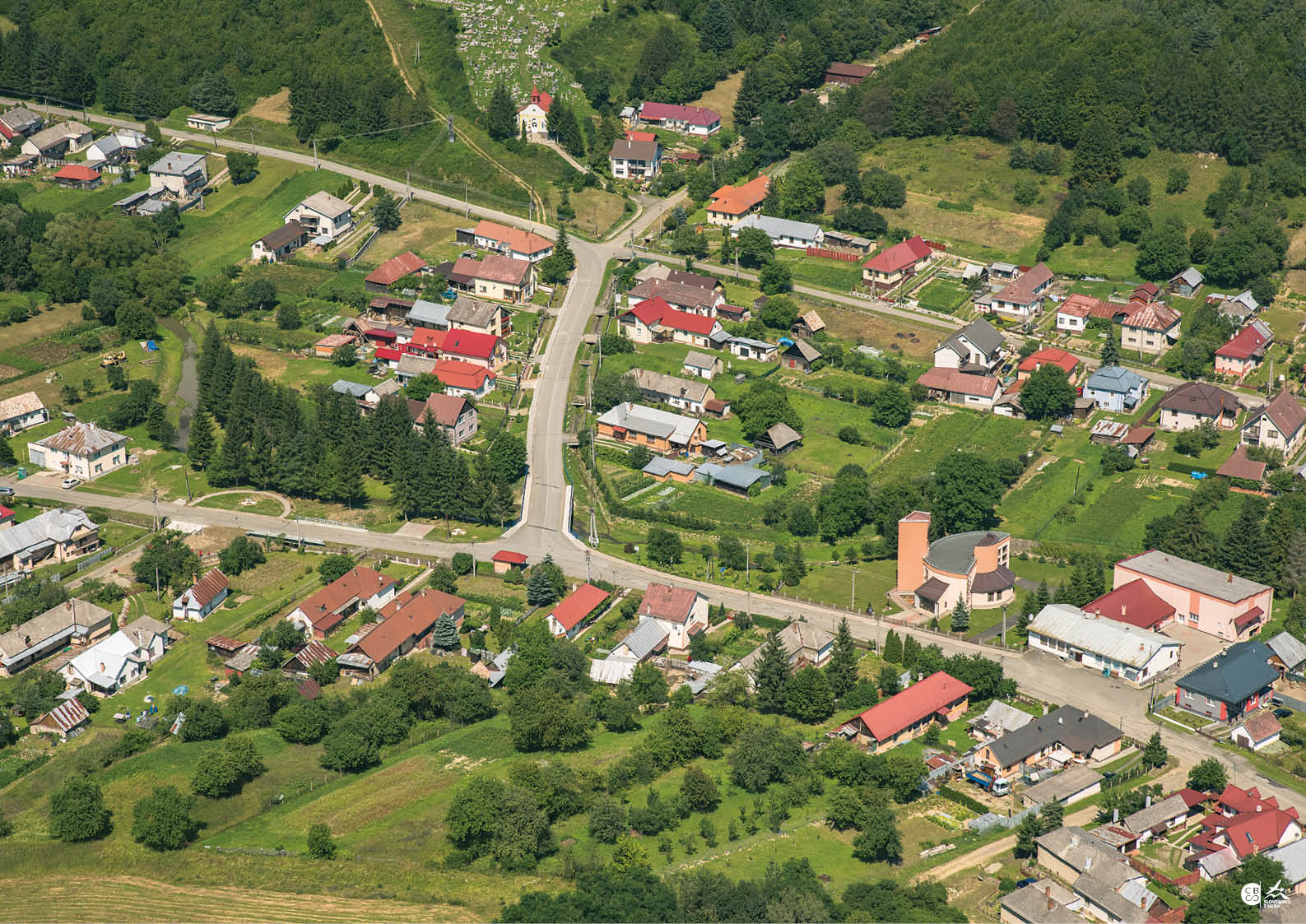

- Flag

- Location of Vyšná Sitnica in the Prešov Region Location of Vyšná Sitnica in Slovakia
- Coordinates: 49.10°N 21.80°E
- Country: Slovakia
- Region: Prešov Region
- District: Humenné District
- First mentioned: 1430

Area
  - Total: 9.78 km^{2} (3.78 sq mi)
- Elevation: 193 m (633 ft)

Population (2025)
  - Total: 322
- Time zone: UTC+1 (CET)
  - Summer (DST): UTC+2 (CEST)
- Postal code: 940 7
- Area code: +421 57
- Vehicle registration plate (until 2022): HE
- Website: www.vysnasitnica.sk

Vyšná Sitnica is a village and municipality in Humenné District in the Prešov Region of north-east Slovakia.

== History ==
In historical records the village was first mentioned in 1430.

== Geography ==
The municipality lies at an altitude of 193 metres (633 ft) and covers an area of 9.78 km^{2} (3.78 sq mi) (2025).

== Population ==
Population statistic (10 years)
Year	1995	2005	2015	2025
Count	451	402	377	322
Difference		−10.86%	−6.21%	−14.58%

Population statistic
Year	2024	2025
Count	325	322
Difference		−0.92%

It has a population of 322 people (31 December 2025).

=== Ethnicity ===
Census 2021 (1+ %)
Ethnicity	Number	Fraction
Slovak	341	99.12%
Rusyn	7	2.03%
Total	344	

In year 2021 was 344 people by ethnicity 341 as Slovak, 7 as Rusyn, 2 as Ukrainian, 2 as Not found out, 1 as Czech, 1 as Hungarian and 1 as Other.

Note on population: The difference values of population numbers in the table "Population statistic" and in the sections "Ethnicity" & "Religion" is caused by the use of various statistical methods.

=== Religion ===
Census 2021 (1+ %)
Religion	Number	Fraction
Roman Catholic Church	312	90.7%
Greek Catholic Church	26	7.56%
None	5	1.45%
Total	344	

In year 2021 was 344 people by religion 312 from Roman Catholic Church, 26 from Greek Catholic Church, 5 from None and 1 from Other.
