= Vyšné Ladičkovce =

- Municipality
- Flag

- Location of Vyšné Ladičkovce in the Prešov Region Location of Vyšné Ladičkovce in Slovakia
- Coordinates: 49.03°N 21.90°E
- Country: Slovakia
- Region: Prešov Region
- District: Humenné District
- First mentioned: 1427

Area
  - Total: 15.40 km^{2} (5.95 sq mi)
- Elevation: 232 m (761 ft)

Population (2025)
  - Total: 177
- Time zone: UTC+1 (CET)
  - Summer (DST): UTC+2 (CEST)
- Postal code: 671 1
- Area code: +421 57
- Vehicle registration plate (until 2022): HE
- Website: www.obecvysneladickovce.sk

Vyšné Ladičkovce is a village and municipality in Humenné District in the Prešov Region of north-east Slovakia.

== History ==
In historical records the village was first mentioned in 1427.

== Geography ==
The municipality lies at an altitude of 232 metres (761 ft) and covers an area of 15.40 km^{2} (5.95 sq mi) (2025).

== Population ==
Population statistic (10 years)
Year	1995	2005	2015	2025
Count	260	226	202	177
Difference		−13.07%	−10.61%	−12.37%

Population statistic
Year	2024	2025
Count	180	177
Difference		−1.66%

It has a population of 177 people (31 December 2025).

=== Ethnicity ===
Census 2021 (1+ %)
Ethnicity	Number	Fraction
Slovak	181	97.83%
Rusyn	6	3.24%
Not found out	3	1.62%
Total	185	

In year 2021 was 185 people by ethnicity 181 as Slovak, 6 as Rusyn, 3 as Not found out, 1 as Russian and 1 as German.

Note on population: The difference values of population numbers in the table "Population statistic" and in the sections "Ethnicity" & "Religion" is caused by the use of various statistical methods.

=== Religion ===
Census 2021 (1+ %)
Religion	Number	Fraction
Roman Catholic Church	170	91.89%
Greek Catholic Church	5	2.7%
None	5	2.7%
Not found out	2	1.08%
Total	185	

In year 2021 was 185 people by religion 170 from Roman Catholic Church, 5 from Greek Catholic Church, 5 from None, 2 from Not found out, 1 from Eastern Orthodox Church, 1 from Evangelical Church and 1 from Ad hoc movements.
