= Sopkovce =

- Municipality
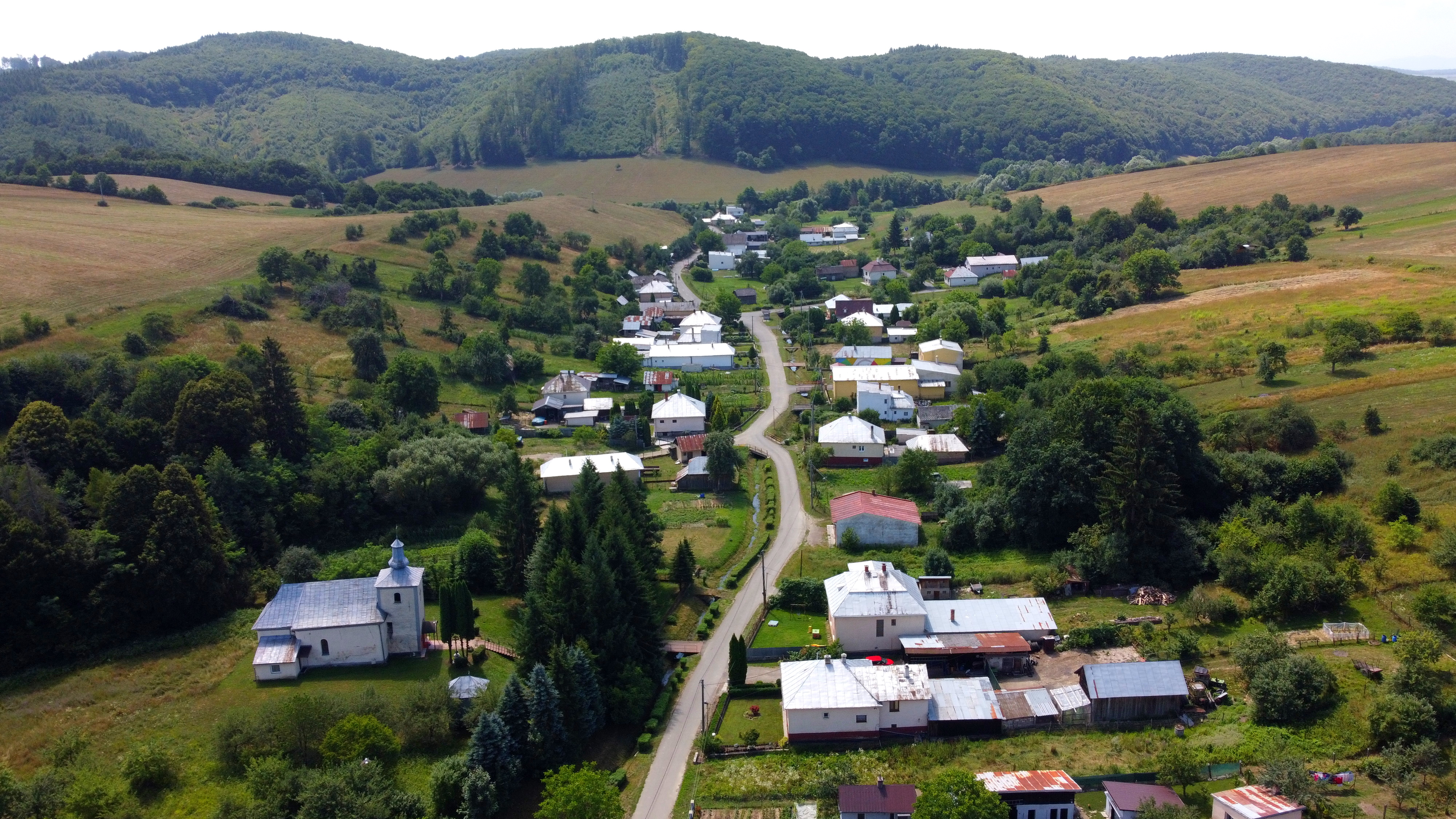

- Flag

- Location of Sopkovce in the Prešov Region Location of Sopkovce in Slovakia
- Coordinates: 49.02°N 21.87°E
- Country: Slovakia
- Region: Prešov Region
- District: Humenné District
- First mentioned: 1567

Area
  - Total: 7.22 km^{2} (2.79 sq mi)
- Elevation: 208 m (682 ft)

Population (2025)
  - Total: 96
- Time zone: UTC+1 (CET)
  - Summer (DST): UTC+2 (CEST)
- Postal code: 672 2
- Area code: +421 57
- Vehicle registration plate (until 2022): HE
- Website: obecsopkovce.sk

Sopkovce is a village and municipality in Humenné District in the Prešov Region of north-east Slovakia.

== History ==
In historical records the village was first mentioned in 1567.

== Geography ==
The municipality lies at an altitude of 208 metres (682 ft) and covers an area of 7.22 km^{2} (2.79 sq mi) (2025).

== Population ==
Population statistic (10 years)
Year	1995	2005	2015	2025
Count	140	128	106	96
Difference		−8.57%	−17.18%	−9.43%

Population statistic
Year	2024	2025
Count	96	96
Difference		+0%

It has a population of 96 people (31 December 2025).

=== Ethnicity ===
Census 2021 (1+ %)
Ethnicity	Number	Fraction
Slovak	98	98%
Rusyn	2	2%
Not found out	2	2%
Total	100	

In year 2021 was 100 people by ethnicity 98 as Slovak, 2 as Rusyn and 2 as Not found out.

Note on population: The difference values of population numbers in the table "Population statistic" and in the sections "Ethnicity" & "Religion" is caused by the use of various statistical methods.

=== Religion ===
Census 2021 (1+ %)
Religion	Number	Fraction
Roman Catholic Church	58	58%
Greek Catholic Church	36	36%
None	4	4%
Not found out	2	2%
Total	100	

In year 2021 was 100 people by religion 58 from Roman Catholic Church, 36 from Greek Catholic Church, 4 from None and 2 from Not found out.
