= Myslina =

- Municipality
- Flag

- Location of Myslina in the Prešov Region Location of Myslina in Slovakia
- Coordinates: 48.95°N 21.85°E
- Country: Slovakia
- Region: Prešov Region
- District: Humenné District
- First mentioned: 1330

Area
  - Total: 9.54 km^{2} (3.68 sq mi)
- Elevation: 160 m (520 ft)

Population (2025)
  - Total: 600
- Time zone: UTC+1 (CET)
  - Summer (DST): UTC+2 (CEST)
- Postal code: 660 1
- Area code: +421 57
- Vehicle registration plate (until 2022): HE
- Website: www.obecmyslina.sk

Myslina is a village and municipality in Humenné District in the Prešov Region of north-east Slovakia.

== History ==
In historical records the village was first mentioned in 1307.

== Geography ==
The municipality lies at an altitude of 160 metres (520 ft) and covers an area of 9.54 km^{2} (3.68 sq mi) (2025).

== Population ==
Population statistic (10 years)
Year	1995	2005	2015	2025
Count	534	556	592	600
Difference		+4.11%	+6.47%	+1.35%

Population statistic
Year	2024	2025
Count	599	600
Difference		+0.16%

It has a population of 600 people (31 December 2025).

=== Ethnicity ===
Census 2021 (1+ %)
Ethnicity	Number	Fraction
Slovak	566	97.08%
Not found out	12	2.05%
Rusyn	6	1.02%
Total	583	

In year 2021 was 583 people by ethnicity 566 as Slovak, 12 as Not found out, 6 as Rusyn, 4 as Other, 3 as Czech, 3 as Romani and 2 as German.

Note on population: The difference values of population numbers in the table "Population statistic" and in the sections "Ethnicity" & "Religion" is caused by the use of various statistical methods.

=== Religion ===
Census 2021 (1+ %)
Religion	Number	Fraction
Roman Catholic Church	513	87.99%
None	25	4.29%
Greek Catholic Church	23	3.95%
Not found out	12	2.06%
Total	583	

In year 2021 was 583 people by religion 513 from Roman Catholic Church, 25 from None, 23 from Greek Catholic Church, 12 from Not found out, 4 from Islam, 2 from Eastern Orthodox Church, 2 from Christian Congregations in Slovakia, 1 from Calvinist Church and 1 from Ad hoc movements.
