= Prituľany =

- Municipality
- Flag Coat of arms

- Location of Prituľany in the Prešov Region Location of Prituľany in Slovakia
- Coordinates: 49.13°N 21.78°E
- Country: Slovakia
- Region: Prešov Region
- District: Humenné District
- First mentioned: 1454

Area
  - Total: 6.48 km^{2} (2.50 sq mi)
- Elevation: 233 m (764 ft)

Population (2025)
  - Total: 37
- Time zone: UTC+1 (CET)
  - Summer (DST): UTC+2 (CEST)
- Postal code: 940 8
- Area code: +421 57
- Vehicle registration plate (until 2022): HE

Prituľany (Rusyn: Притуляны) is a village and municipality in Humenné District in the Prešov Region of north-east Slovakia.

== History ==
In historical records the village was first mentioned in 1454.

== Geography ==
The municipality lies at an altitude of 233 metres (764 ft) and covers an area of 6.48 km^{2} (2.50 sq mi) (2025).

== Population ==
Population statistic (10 years)
| Year | 1995 | 2005 | 2015 | 2025 |
|---|---|---|---|---|
| Count | 83 | 65 | 53 | 37 |
| Difference | | −21.68% | −18.46% | −30.18% |

Population statistic
| Year | 2024 | 2025 |
|---|---|---|
| Count | 37 | 37 |
| Difference | | +0% |

It has a population of 37 people (31 December 2025).

=== Ethnicity ===
Census 2021 (1+ %)
| Ethnicity | Number | Fraction |
|---|---|---|
| Rusyn | 27 | 65.85% |
| Slovak | 20 | 48.78% |
| Not found out | 1 | 2.43% |
| Total | 41 | |

In year 2021 was 41 people by ethnicity 27 as Rusyn, 20 as Slovak and 1 as Not found out.

Note on population: The difference values of population numbers in the table "Population statistic" and in the sections "Ethnicity" & "Religion" is caused by the use of various statistical methods.

=== Religion ===
Census 2021 (1+ %)
| Religion | Number | Fraction |
|---|---|---|
| Greek Catholic Church | 29 | 70.73% |
| Roman Catholic Church | 6 | 14.63% |
| None | 4 | 9.76% |
| Eastern Orthodox Church | 1 | 2.44% |
| Not found out | 1 | 2.44% |
| Total | 41 | |

In year 2021 was 41 people by religion 29 from Greek Catholic Church, 6 from Roman Catholic Church, 4 from None, 1 from Eastern Orthodox Church and 1 from Not found out.
