= Nižná Sitnica =

- Municipality
- Flag

- Location of Nižná Sitnica in the Prešov Region Location of Nižná Sitnica in Slovakia
- Coordinates: 49.07°N 21.80°E
- Country: Slovakia
- Region: Prešov Region
- District: Humenné District
- First mentioned: 1408

Area
  - Total: 9.17 km^{2} (3.54 sq mi)
- Elevation: 169 m (554 ft)

Population (2025)
  - Total: 307
- Time zone: UTC+1 (CET)
  - Summer (DST): UTC+2 (CEST)
- Postal code: 940 7
- Area code: +421 57
- Vehicle registration plate (until 2022): HE
- Website: www.niznasitnica.sk

Nižná Sitnica is a village and municipality in Humenné District in the Prešov Region of north-east Slovakia.

== History ==
In historical records the village was first mentioned in 1408.

== Geography ==
The municipality lies at an altitude of 169 metres (554 ft) and covers an area of 9.17 km^{2} (3.54 sq mi) (2025).

== Population ==
Population statistic (10 years)
Year	1995	2005	2015	2025
Count	373	363	325	307
Difference		−2.68%	−10.46%	−5.53%

Population statistic
Year	2024	2025
Count	303	307
Difference		+1.32%

It has a population of 307 people (31 December 2025).

=== Ethnicity ===
Census 2021 (1+ %)
Ethnicity	Number	Fraction
Slovak	293	97.99%
Rusyn	5	1.67%
Not found out	4	1.33%
Total	299	

In year 2021 was 299 people by ethnicity 293 as Slovak, 5 as Rusyn, 4 as Not found out, 1 as Czech, 1 as Polish, 1 as Hungarian and 1 as Other.

Note on population: The difference values of population numbers in the table "Population statistic" and in the sections "Ethnicity" & "Religion" is caused by the use of various statistical methods.

=== Religion ===
Census 2021 (1+ %)
Religion	Number	Fraction
Roman Catholic Church	267	89.3%
Greek Catholic Church	12	4.01%
Not found out	7	2.34%
None	5	1.67%
Other	4	1.34%
Total	299	

In year 2021 was 299 people by religion 267 from Roman Catholic Church, 12 from Greek Catholic Church, 7 from Not found out, 5 from None, 4 from Other, 2 from Eastern Orthodox Church, 1 from Evangelical Church and 1 from Ad hoc movements.
