= Chlmec =

- Municipality
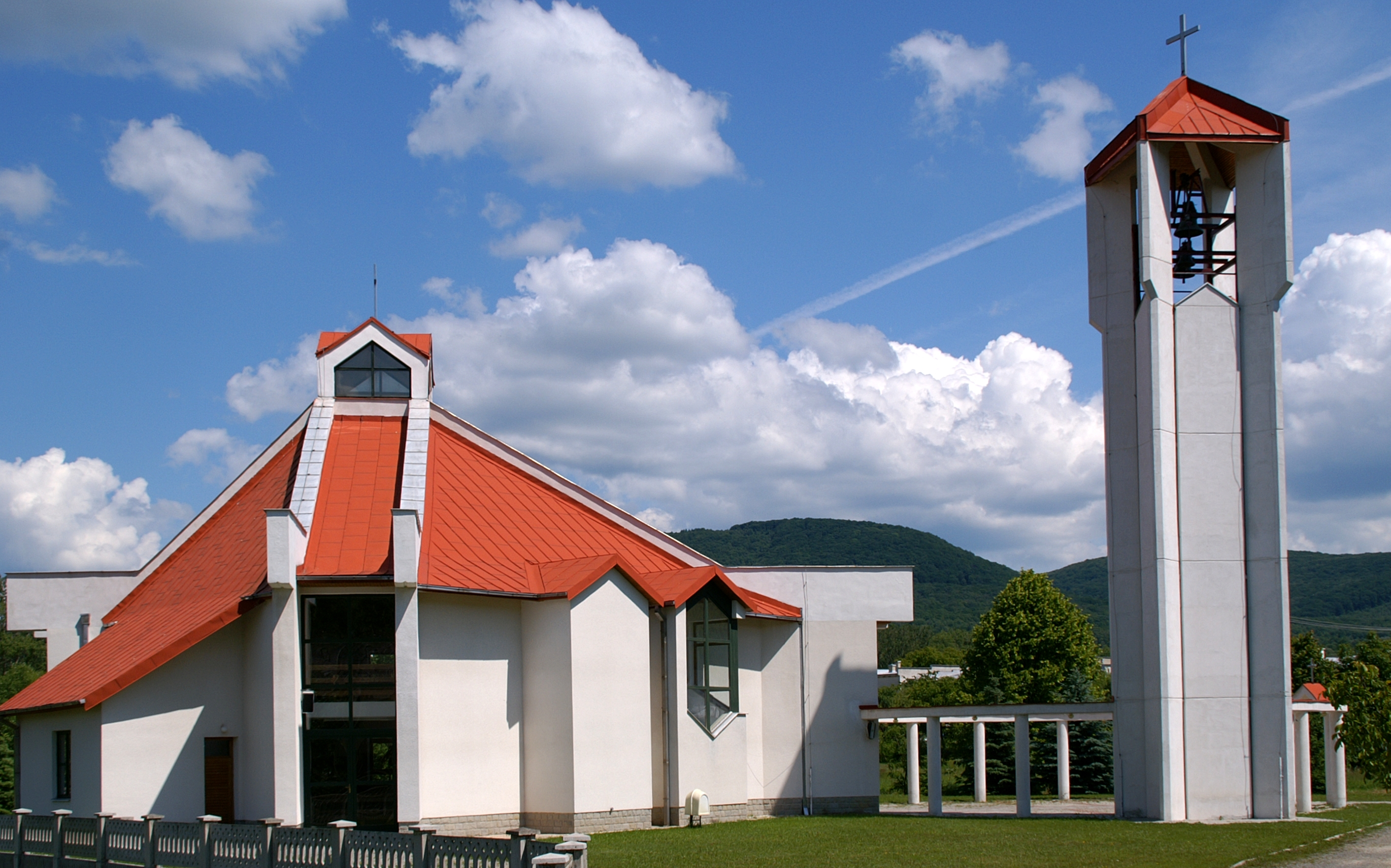

- Flag

- Location of Chlmec in the Prešov Region Location of Chlmec in Slovakia
- Coordinates: 48.88°N 21.93°E
- Country: Slovakia
- Region: Prešov Region
- District: Humenné District
- First mentioned: 1451

Area
  - Total: 7.90 km^{2} (3.05 sq mi)
- Elevation: 212 m (696 ft)

Population (2025)
  - Total: 584
- Time zone: UTC+1 (CET)
  - Summer (DST): UTC+2 (CEST)
- Postal code: 674 1
- Area code: +421 57
- Vehicle registration plate (until 2022): HE
- Website: www.obecchlmec.sk

Chlmec (Hungarian: Helmecke) is a village and municipality in Humenné District in the Prešov Region of north-east Slovakia.

== History ==
In historical records, the village was first mentioned in 1451. Before the establishment of independent Czechoslovakia in 1918, Chlmec was part of Zemplén County within the Kingdom of Hungary. From 1939 to 1944, it was part of the Slovak Republic. On 26 November 1944, the Red Army dislodged the Wehrmacht from Chlmec and it was once again part of Czechoslovakia.

== Geography ==
The municipality lies at an altitude of 212 metres (696 ft) and covers an area of 7.90 km^{2} (3.05 sq mi) (2025).

== Population ==
Population statistic (10 years)
Year	1995	2005	2015	2025
Count	546	552	577	584
Difference		+1.09%	+4.52%	+1.21%

Population statistic
Year	2024	2025
Count	589	584
Difference		−0.84%

It has a population of 584 people (31 December 2025).

=== Ethnicity ===
Census 2021 (1+ %)
Ethnicity	Number	Fraction
Slovak	577	98.12%
Rusyn	22	3.74%
Not found out	10	1.7%
Total	588	

In year 2021 was 588 people by ethnicity 577 as Slovak, 22 as Rusyn, 10 as Not found out, 4 as Other, 1 as Czech, 1 as Ukrainian and 1 as Hungarian.

Note on population: The difference values of population numbers in the table "Population statistic" and in the sections "Ethnicity" & "Religion" is caused by the use of various statistical methods.

=== Religion ===
Census 2021 (1+ %)
Religion	Number	Fraction
Roman Catholic Church	506	86.05%
Greek Catholic Church	31	5.27%
None	30	5.1%
Eastern Orthodox Church	8	1.36%
Not found out	8	1.36%
Total	588	

In year 2021 was 588 people by religion 506 from Roman Catholic Church, 31 from Greek Catholic Church, 30 from None, 8 from Eastern Orthodox Church, 8 from Not found out, 2 from Ad hoc movements, 1 from Other and not ascertained christian church, 1 from Other and 1 from Buddhism.
