= Hudcovce =

- Municipality
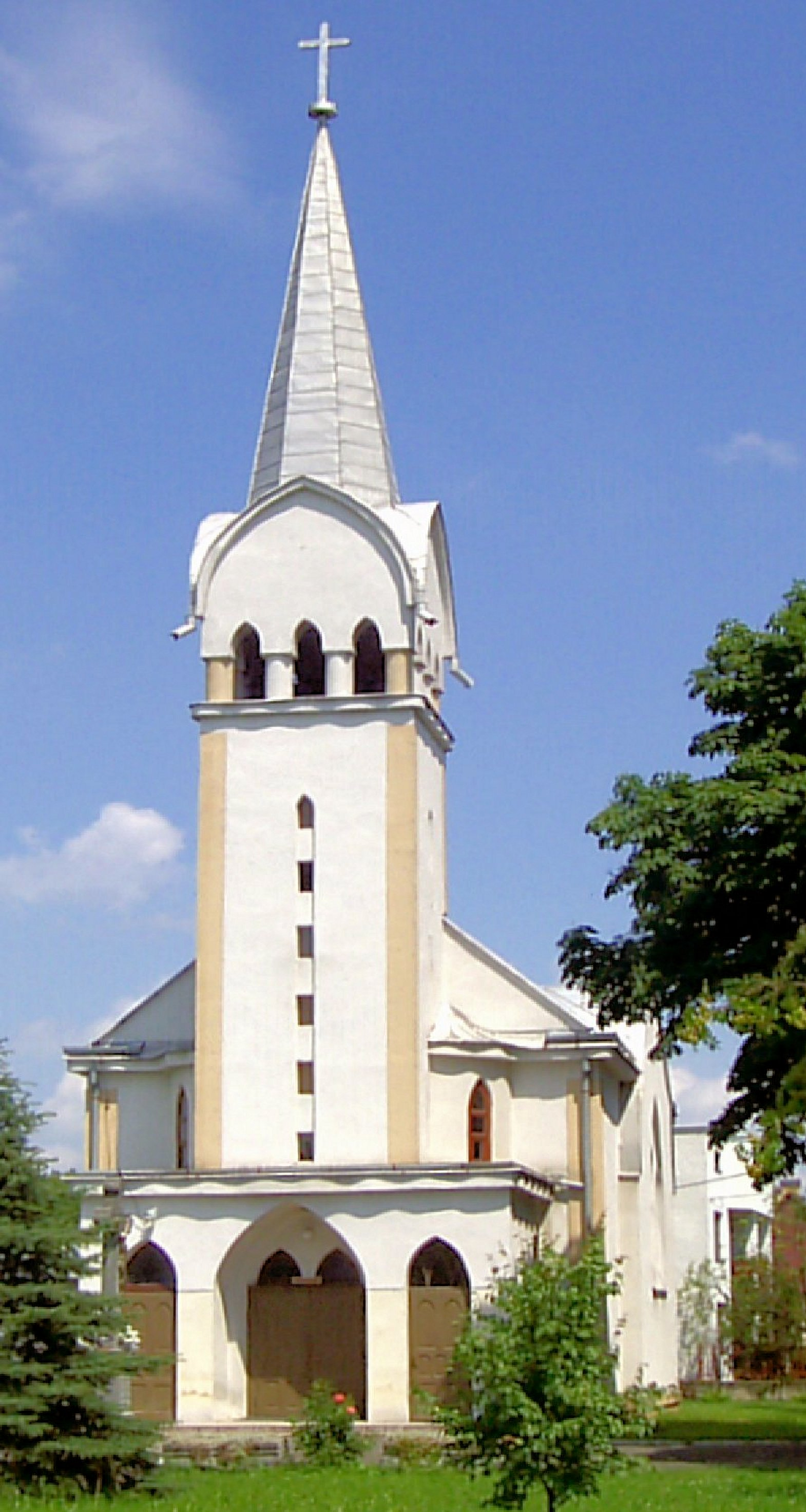

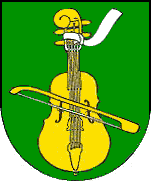
- Flag Coat of arms

- Location of Hudcovce in the Prešov Region Location of Hudcovce in Slovakia
- Coordinates: 48.92°N 21.80°E
- Country: Slovakia
- Region: Prešov Region
- District: Humenné District
- First mentioned: 1467

Area
  - Total: 5.86 km^{2} (2.26 sq mi)
- Elevation: 136 m (446 ft)

Population (2025)
  - Total: 374
- Time zone: UTC+1 (CET)
  - Summer (DST): UTC+2 (CEST)
- Postal code: 674 5
- Area code: +421 57
- Vehicle registration plate (until 2022): HE
- Website: www.hudcovce.sk

Hudcovce is a village and municipality in Humenné District in the Prešov Region of north-east Slovakia.

== History ==
In historical records the village was first mentioned in 1467.

== Geography ==
The municipality lies at an altitude of 136 metres (446 ft) and covers an area of 5.86 km^{2} (2.26 sq mi) (2025).

== Population ==
Population statistic (10 years)
Year	1995	2005	2015	2025
Count	405	423	423	374
Difference		+4.44%	−1.42%	−11.58%

Population statistic
Year	2024	2025
Count	376	374
Difference		−0.53%

It has a population of 374 people (31 December 2025).

=== Ethnicity ===
Census 2021 (1+ %)
Ethnicity	Number	Fraction
Slovak	386	97.72%
Not found out	7	1.77%
Rusyn	6	1.51%
Total	395	

In year 2021 was 395 people by ethnicity 386 as Slovak, 7 as Not found out, 6 as Rusyn, 2 as Czech and 1 as Ukrainian.

Note on population: The difference values of population numbers in the table "Population statistic" and in the sections "Ethnicity" & "Religion" is caused by the use of various statistical methods.

=== Religion ===
Census 2021 (1+ %)
Religion	Number	Fraction
Roman Catholic Church	332	84.05%
Greek Catholic Church	39	9.87%
None	12	3.04%
Not found out	7	1.77%
Total	395	

In year 2021 was 395 people by religion 332 from Roman Catholic Church, 39 from Greek Catholic Church, 12 from None, 7 from Not found out, 2 from Evangelical Church, 1 from Other and not ascertained christian church, 1 from Jehovah's Witnesses and 1 from Buddhism.
