= Slovenská Volová =

- Municipality
- Flag

- Location of Slovenská Volová in the Prešov Region Location of Slovenská Volová in Slovakia
- Coordinates: 48.98°N 21.85°E
- Country: Slovakia
- Region: Prešov Region
- District: Humenné District
- First mentioned: 1451

Area
  - Total: 8.69 km^{2} (3.36 sq mi)
- Elevation: 165 m (541 ft)

Population (2025)
  - Total: 579
- Time zone: UTC+1 (CET)
  - Summer (DST): UTC+2 (CEST)
- Postal code: 672 2
- Area code: +421 57
- Vehicle registration plate (until 2022): HE
- Website: slovenska-volova.webnode.sk

Slovenská Volová is a village and municipality in Humenné District in the Prešov Region of north-east Slovakia.

== History ==
In historical records the village was first mentioned in 1451.

== Geography ==
The municipality lies at an altitude of 165 metres (541 ft) and covers an area of 8.69 km^{2} (3.36 sq mi) (2025).

== Population ==
Population statistic (10 years)
| Year | 1995 | 2005 | 2015 | 2025 |
|---|---|---|---|---|
| Count | 441 | 499 | 549 | 579 |
| Difference | | +13.15% | +10.02% | +5.46% |

Population statistic
| Year | 2024 | 2025 |
|---|---|---|
| Count | 581 | 579 |
| Difference | | −0.34% |

It has a population of 579 people (31 December 2025).

=== Ethnicity ===
Census 2021 (1+ %)
| Ethnicity | Number | Fraction |
|---|---|---|
| Slovak | 521 | 92.86% |
| Not found out | 31 | 5.52% |
| Romani | 15 | 2.67% |
| Total | 561 | |

In year 2021 was 561 people by ethnicity 521 as Slovak, 31 as Not found out, 15 as Romani, 4 as Rusyn, 1 as Ukrainian, 1 as Russian, 1 as Polish, 1 as Moravian and 1 as Other.

Note on population: The difference values of population numbers in the table "Population statistic" and in the sections "Ethnicity" & "Religion" is caused by the use of various statistical methods.

=== Religion ===
Census 2021 (1+ %)
| Religion | Number | Fraction |
|---|---|---|
| Roman Catholic Church | 425 | 75.76% |
| Apostolic Church | 43 | 7.66% |
| Greek Catholic Church | 29 | 5.17% |
| Not found out | 28 | 4.99% |
| None | 25 | 4.46% |
| Total | 561 | |

In year 2021 was 561 people by religion 425 from Roman Catholic Church, 43 from Apostolic Church, 29 from Greek Catholic Church, 28 from Not found out, 25 from None, 4 from Eastern Orthodox Church, 4 from Evangelical Church, 2 from Christian Congregations in Slovakia and 1 from Baptists Church.
