= Maškovce =

- Municipality
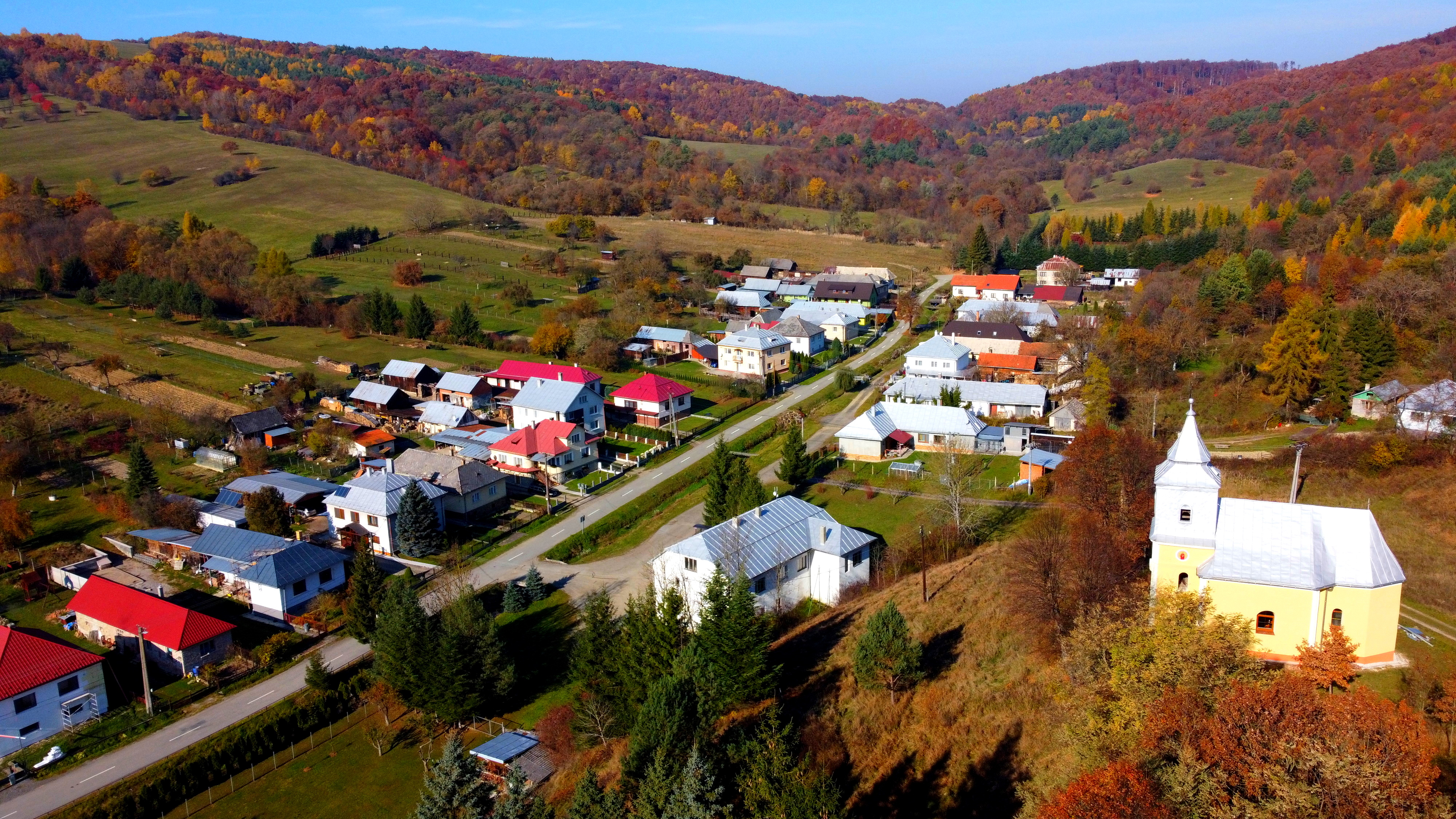

- Flag

- Location of Maškovce in the Prešov Region Location of Maškovce in Slovakia
- Coordinates: 49.02°N 22.00°E
- Country: Slovakia
- Region: Prešov Region
- District: Humenné District
- First mentioned: 1574

Area
  - Total: 6.99 km^{2} (2.70 sq mi)
- Elevation: 228 m (748 ft)

Population (2025)
  - Total: 57
- Time zone: UTC+1 (CET)
  - Summer (DST): UTC+2 (CEST)
- Postal code: 673 2
- Area code: +421 57
- Vehicle registration plate (until 2022): HE
- Website: www.maskovce.sk

Maškovce (Rusyn: Машківцї; Hungarian: Maskóc) is a village and municipality in Humenné District in the Prešov Region of north-east Slovakia.

== History ==
In historical records the village was first mentioned in 1574.

== Geography ==
The municipality lies at an altitude of 228 metres (748 ft) and covers an area of 6.99 km^{2} (2.70 sq mi) (2025).

== Population ==
Population statistic (10 years)
Year	1995	2005	2015	2025
Count	64	57	56	57
Difference		−10.93%	−1.75%	+1.78%

Population statistic
Year	2024	2025
Count	58	57
Difference		−1.72%

It has a population of 57 people (31 December 2025).

=== Ethnicity ===
Census 2021 (1+ %)
Ethnicity	Number	Fraction
Slovak	40	76.92%
Rusyn	24	46.15%
Not found out	3	5.76%
Ukrainian	1	1.92%
Total	52	

In year 2021 was 52 people by ethnicity 40 as Slovak, 24 as Rusyn, 3 as Not found out and 1 as Ukrainian.

Note on population: The difference values of population numbers in the table "Population statistic" and in the sections "Ethnicity" & "Religion" is caused by the use of various statistical methods.

=== Religion ===
Census 2021 (1+ %)
Religion	Number	Fraction
Greek Catholic Church	31	59.62%
Roman Catholic Church	7	13.46%
Eastern Orthodox Church	6	11.54%
Not found out	5	9.62%
None	3	5.77%
Total	52	

In year 2021 was 52 people by religion 31 from Greek Catholic Church, 7 from Roman Catholic Church, 6 from Eastern Orthodox Church, 5 from Not found out and 3 from None.
