= Humenné District =

Coordinates: 48°56′2″N 21°54′39″E

- District
- Country: Slovakia
- Region (kraj): Prešov Region
- Seat: Humenné

Area
  - Total: 754.23 km^{2} (291.21 sq mi)

Population (2025)
  - Total: 57,846
- Time zone: UTC+1 (CET)
  - Summer (DST): UTC+2 (CEST)
- Telephone prefix: 057
- Vehicle registration plate (until 2022): HE
- Municipalities: 62

Humenné District (okres Humenné (also spelled Homonna, Homonn, Humen, Harwsfalva)) is a district in the Prešov Region of eastern Slovakia. Until 1920, the district was mostly part of Zemplén (county) of the Kingdom of Hungary, apart from an area to the east of Porúbka in the Vihorlat Mountains (Vihorlatské vrchy) which formed part of the county of Ung.

== Population ==
Population statistic (10 years)
Year	1995	2005	2015	2025
Count	64,882	64,519	63,204	57,846
Difference		−0.55%	−2.03%	−8.47%

Population statistic
Year	2024	2025
Count	58,257	57,846
Difference		−0.70%

It has a population of 57,846 people (31 December 2025).

Historical population
Year	Pop.	±%
1970	47,138	—
1980	55,871	+18.5%
1991	63,011	+12.8%
2001	64,845	+2.9%
2011	64,446	−0.6%
2021	60,126	−6.7%
Source: Statistical Office of the Slovak Republic

=== Ethnicity ===
Census 2021 (1+ %)
Ethnicity	Number	Fraction
Slovak	54,052	82.85%
Rusyn	5140	7.87%
Not found out	3583	5.49%
Romani	1159	1.77%
Total	65,237	

In year 2021 was 65,237 people by ethnicity 54,052 as Slovak, 5140 as Rusyn, 3583 as Not found out, 1159 as Romani, 398 as Ukrainian, 338 as Czech, 140 as Other, 106 as Hungarian, 72 as Polish, 70 as Russian, 36 as Vietnamese, 24 as German, 24 as English, 15 as Moravian, 14 as Irish, 14 as Italian, 7 as Serbian, 7 as Austrian, 6 as Croatian, 5 as Romanian, 5 as Albanian, 4 as Jewish, 4 as Greek, 4 as French, 4 as Bulgarian, 3 as Canadian, 1 as Chinese, 1 as Turkish and 1 as Silesian.

Note on population: The difference values of population numbers in the table "Population statistic" and in the sections "Ethnicity" & "Religion" is caused by the use of various statistical methods.

=== Religion ===
Census 2021 (1+ %)
Religion	Number	Fraction
Roman Catholic Church	38,148	63.45%
Greek Catholic Church	9774	16.26%
None	5641	9.38%
Not found out	3380	5.62%
Eastern Orthodox Church	1919	3.19%
Total	60,126	

In year 2021 was 60,126 people by religion 38,148 from Roman Catholic Church, 9774 from Greek Catholic Church, 5641 from None, 3380 from Not found out, 1919 from Eastern Orthodox Church, 314 from Evangelical Church, 202 from Apostolic Church, 145 from Jehovah's Witnesses, 129 from Ad hoc movements, 109 from Calvinist Church, 98 from Other, 70 from Christian Congregations in Slovakia, 51 from Buddhism, 50 from Other and not ascertained christian church, 16 from Islam, 15 from Paganism and natural spirituality, 11 from Church of the Brethren, 10 from Jewish community, 10 from Church of Jesus Christ of Latter-day Saints, 9 from Seventh-day Adventist Church, 7 from Old Catholic Church, 6 from United Methodist Church, 5 from Hinduism, 3 from Czechoslovak Hussite Church, 2 from Baptists Church and 2 from Bahá'i Community.

== Municipalities ==
Municipality	Area [km^{2}]	Population
Adidovce	20.76	231
Baškovce	6.66	389
Brekov	9.72	1,290
Brestov	10.10	564
Černina	7.39	151
Dedačov	5.74	150
Gruzovce	4.09	136
Hankovce	8.54	496
Hažín nad Cirochou	7.21	649
Hrabovec nad Laborcom	13.53	497
Hrubov	14.41	464
Hudcovce	5.86	374
Humenné	32.26	29,179
Chlmec	7.90	584
Jabloň	11.86	369
Jankovce	5.69	269
Jasenov	12.89	1,243
Kamenica nad Cirochou	17.65	2,309
Kamienka	5.39	538
Karná	10.26	470
Kochanovce	5.04	728
Košarovce	8.00	596
Koškovce	11.70	517
Lackovce	0.00	953
Lieskovec	9.70	412
Ľubiša	10.02	812
Lukačovce	7.43	434
Maškovce	6.99	57
Modra nad Cirochou	7.35	940
Myslina	9.54	600
Nechválova Polianka	12.73	106
Nižná Jablonka	11.89	135
Nižná Sitnica	9.17	307
Nižné Ladičkovce	8.57	314
Ohradzany	12.00	607
Pakostov	14.37	431
Papín	25.87	869
Porúbka	4.32	261
Prituľany	6.48	37
Ptičie	10.46	645
Rohožník	3.59	37
Rokytov pri Humennom	25.68	283
Rovné	8.11	466
Ruská Kajňa	5.10	95
Ruská Poruba	12.02	205
Slovenská Volová	8.69	579
Slovenské Krivé	6.39	118
Sopkovce	7.22	96
Topoľovka	7.77	808
Turcovce	10.00	306
Udavské	13.20	1,219
Veľopolie	7.86	380
Víťazovce	5.56	326
Vyšná Jablonka	24.83	51
Vyšná Sitnica	9.78	322
Vyšné Ladičkovce	15.40	177
Vyšný Hrušov	11.36	468
Závada	9.03	70
Závadka	5.70	546
Zbudské Dlhé	8.35	839
Zubné	19.55	342

Population and area values are current for year 2025.
