= Lieskovec, Humenné District =

Lieskovec
- Municipality
- Flag

- Location of Lieskovec in the Prešov Region Location of Lieskovec in Slovakia
- Coordinates: 48.95°N 21.82°E
- Country: Slovakia
- Region: Prešov Region
- District: Humenné District
- First mentioned: 1430

Area
  - Total: 9.70 km^{2} (3.75 sq mi)
- Elevation: 156 m (512 ft)

Population (2025)
  - Total: 412
- Time zone: UTC+1 (CET)
  - Summer (DST): UTC+2 (CEST)
- Postal code: 674 5
- Area code: +421 57
- Vehicle registration plate (until 2022): HE
- Website: www.obec-lieskovec.sk

Lieskovec is a village and municipality in Humenné District in the Prešov Region of north-east Slovakia.

== History ==
In historical records the village was first mentioned in 1430.

== Geography ==
The municipality lies at an altitude of 156 metres (512 ft) and covers an area of 9.70 km^{2} (3.75 sq mi) (2025).

== Population ==
Population statistic (10 years)
Year	1995	2005	2015	2025
Count	476	450	441	412
Difference		−5.46%	−2%	−6.57%

Population statistic
Year	2024	2025
Count	414	412
Difference		−0.48%

It has a population of 412 people (31 December 2025).

=== Ethnicity ===
Census 2021 (1+ %)
Ethnicity	Number	Fraction
Slovak	432	99.53%
Rusyn	6	1.38%
Total	434	

In year 2021 was 434 people by ethnicity 432 as Slovak, 6 as Rusyn, 1 as Russian, 1 as Hungarian and 1 as Other.

Note on population: The difference values of population numbers in the table "Population statistic" and in the sections "Ethnicity" & "Religion" is caused by the use of various statistical methods.

=== Religion ===
Census 2021 (1+ %)
Religion	Number	Fraction
Roman Catholic Church	403	92.86%
Greek Catholic Church	14	3.23%
None	14	3.23%
Total	434	

In year 2021 was 434 people by religion 403 from Roman Catholic Church, 14 from Greek Catholic Church, 14 from None and 3 from Eastern Orthodox Church.
