= Rovné, Humenné District =

Rovné
- Municipality
- Flag

- Location of Rovné in the Prešov Region Location of Rovné in Slovakia
- Coordinates: 48.98°N 22.01°E
- Country: Slovakia
- Region: Prešov Region
- District: Humenné District
- First mentioned: 1567

Area
  - Total: 8.11 km^{2} (3.13 sq mi)
- Elevation: 188 m (617 ft)

Population (2025)
  - Total: 466
- Time zone: UTC+1 (CET)
  - Summer (DST): UTC+2 (CEST)
- Postal code: 673 2
- Area code: +421 57
- Vehicle registration plate (until 2022): HE
- Website: www.rovne.eu

Rovné is a village and municipality in Humenné District in the Prešov Region of north-east Slovakia.

== History ==
In historical records the village was first mentioned in 1567.

== Geography ==
The municipality lies at an altitude of 188 metres (617 ft) and covers an area of 8.11 km^{2} (3.13 sq mi) (2025).

== Population ==
Population statistic (10 years)
Year	1995	2005	2015	2025
Count	485	465	437	466
Difference		−4.12%	−6.02%	+6.63%

Population statistic
Year	2024	2025
Count	462	466
Difference		+0.86%

It has a population of 466 people (31 December 2025).

=== Ethnicity ===
Census 2021 (1+ %)
Ethnicity	Number	Fraction
Slovak	454	97.84%
Rusyn	23	4.95%
Romani	15	3.23%
Not found out	7	1.5%
Total	464	

In year 2021 was 464 people by ethnicity 454 as Slovak, 23 as Rusyn, 15 as Romani, 7 as Not found out, 3 as Ukrainian, 2 as Czech, 2 as Other, 1 as Russian and 1 as English.

Note on population: The difference values of population numbers in the table "Population statistic" and in the sections "Ethnicity" & "Religion" is caused by the use of various statistical methods.

=== Religion ===
Census 2021 (1+ %)
Religion	Number	Fraction
Roman Catholic Church	392	84.48%
Greek Catholic Church	31	6.68%
None	19	4.09%
Eastern Orthodox Church	8	1.72%
Not found out	6	1.29%
Total	464	

In year 2021 was 464 people by religion 392 from Roman Catholic Church, 31 from Greek Catholic Church, 19 from None, 8 from Eastern Orthodox Church, 6 from Not found out, 2 from Calvinist Church, 2 from Jehovah's Witnesses, 1 from Old Catholic Church, 1 from Evangelical Church, 1 from Buddhism and 1 from Ad hoc movements.
