= Bulgaria–Yugoslavia relations =

- Bulgaria: Yugoslavia

Bulgaria–Yugoslavia relations
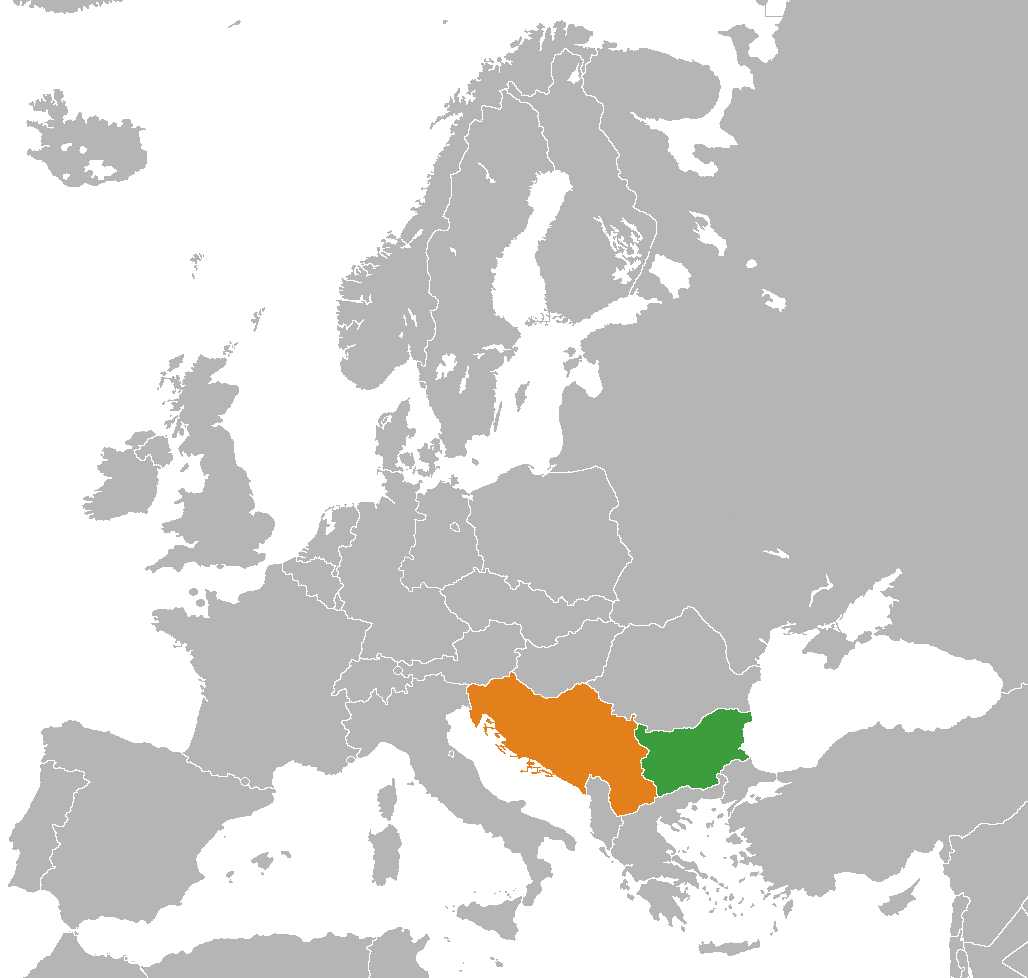

- Bulgaria: Yugoslavia

Bulgaria–Yugoslavia relations
- Bulgaria: Yugoslavia

Bulgaria–Yugoslavia relations (Note: Bulgarian: Отношенията между България и Югославия, romanized: Otnošenijata meždu Bǎlgarija i Jugoslavija; Serbo-Croatian: Bugarsko-jugoslavenski odnosi, Бугарско-југословенски односи; Slovene: Odnosi med Bolgarijo in Jugoslavijo; Macedonian: Односите меѓу Бугарија и Југославија, romanized: Odnosite meǵu Bugarija i Jugoslavija) were historical foreign relations between Bulgaria (Note: Both the Kingdom of Bulgaria from 1908 to 1946 and the People's Republic of Bulgaria from 1946 to 1990.) and Yugoslavia. (Note: Both the Kingdom of Yugoslavia from 1918 to 1941 and the Socialist Federal Republic of Yugoslavia from 1945 to 1992.) Despite some substantial unification proposals in the aftermath of the Second World War, Bulgarians were the only South Slavic nation which did not join the Yugoslav federation.

== History ==
=== Interwar period ===
While there were close ethnic, historic, linguistic and religious links between population of Yugoslavia and Bulgaria, the two states found themselves on the opposing sides in the period after the end of World War I. After the creation of Yugoslavia the newly formed Kingdom of Yugoslavia was a status quo state which sought to consolidate success of the South Slavic unification movement while Bulgaria was a revisionist state whose leaders believed that their country had a right to some parts of Yugoslavia - particularly Vardar Banovina. Relations were further strained by the Internal Macedonian Revolutionary Organization's nationalist terrorist attacks against Yugoslav rule in Macedonia from Bulgaria with government assistance. When Bulgaria tried to suppress the IMRO in 1923, it responded by helping stage a coup d'état against Bulgarian Prime Minister Aleksandar Stamboliyski and continuing to operate as a state-within-a-state based in Petrich until 1934. Similarly to the situation with Kingdom of Serbia in the Second Balkan War, Yugoslavia joined forces with Kingdom of Greece, Kingdom of Romania and Turkey in establishing the Balkan Pact aimed at maintaining the geopolitical status quo and presenting a united front against Bulgarian designs on their territories.

=== World War II ===
During World War II in Yugoslavia, Bulgaria was an ally of Nazi Germany while Bulgarian Armed Forces occupied parts of Yugoslavia which Bulgarian irredentism claimed on the basis of the 1878 Treaty of San Stefano.

=== Cold War period ===
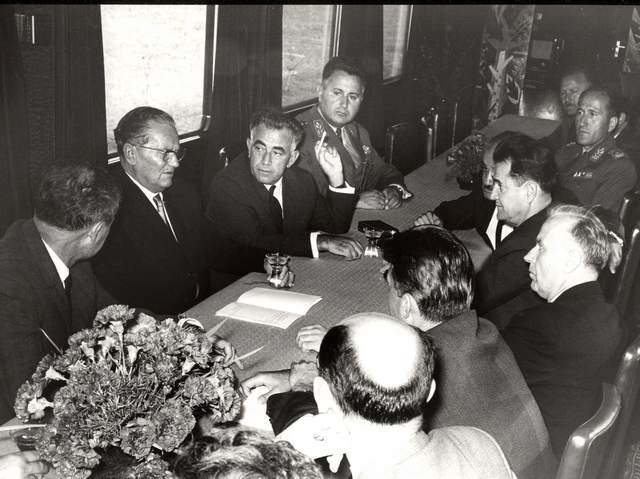
Official Yugoslav delegation led by President Josip Broz Tito return from Bulgaria (Dimitrovgrad, 1965)

After the interwar kingdom was only partially successful in creation of Yugoslav nation, post-war communist authorities dismissed the idea in an effort to create federal state which will enable national emancipation of all ethnic groups. The new socialist federation enabled creation of 6 constituent republics one of which was the Socialist Republic of Macedonia. In that period Bulgarian state itself promoted identity of ethnic Macedonians in Bulgaria. Yugoslavia and Bulgaria developed close cooperation with an idea of creation of the Greater Yugoslavia and ultimately the Balkan Federation. The first formal step in that direction was made by the signing of the Bled Agreement on August 1, 1947. The initiative, however, was terminated by Joseph Stalin who perceived it as a threat to his authority.

==== Relations after 1948 Tito-Stalin split ====
While the Bulgarian Communist Party needed Soviet support to gain the power in the country, the League of Communists of Yugoslavia was in a position to independently establish effective control over the country already in 1945. This led new Yugoslav authorities to expect the status of an ally instead of a satellite state within the Eastern Bloc. The situation escalated in response to the 1948 Tito–Stalin split after which Yugoslav relations with all Eastern Bloc countries, including Bulgaria, were either suspended or significantly strained. Yugoslavia then reoriented its policy towards the close cooperation with Non-Aligned countries.

At the end of the 1970s and the beginning of the 1980s, popular culture from Yugoslavia and particularly from the Socialist Republic of Serbia served Bulgarian citizens as a window to the West through which entertainers and other cultural content entered the country.

== See also ==
- Bulgaria–Croatia relations
- Bulgaria–Kosovo relations
- Bulgaria–Montenegro relations
- Bulgaria–North Macedonia relations
- Bulgaria–Serbia relations
- Bulgaria–Slovenia relations
- First Balkan War
- Serbo-Bulgarian War
- Group of Nine
