= Rusyn language =

East Slavic language

Rusyn
- русиньскый язык; руски язик rusîn'skyj jazyk; ruski jazik
- Ethnicity: Rusyns
- Native speakers: (70,000 cited 2001–2013); Slovakia – 38,679; Serbia – 15,626; Poland – 10,000; Ukraine – 6,725; Croatia – 2,337; Hungary – 1,113; Czech Republic – 777
- Language family: Indo-European: Balto-Slavic; Slavic; East Slavic; Rusyn
- Early forms: Proto-Indo-European: Proto-Balto-Slavic; Proto-Slavic; Old East Slavic; Ruthenian
- Dialects: Lemko; Prešov; Subcarpathian
- Writing system: Cyrillic script (Rusyn alphabets); Latin script (unofficially in Slovakia alongside the Cyrillic script)

Official status
- Official language in: Serbia (in Vojvodina)
- Recognised minority language in: Bosnia and Herzegovina; Croatia; Czech Republic; Hungary; Poland; Romania; Slovakia

Language codes
- ISO 639-3: rue
- Glottolog: rusy1239
- Linguasphere: 53-AAA-ec < 53-AAA-e (varieties: 53-AAA-eca to 53-AAA-ecc)
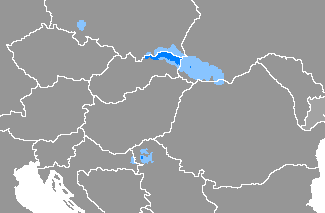

- Rusyn is classified as Vulnerable by the UNESCO Atlas of the World's Languages in Danger.

Rusyn (/ˈruːsɪn/ ROO-sin; Carpathian Rusyn: русиньскый язык, romanized: rusîn'skyj jazyk; Pannonian Rusyn: руски язик, romanized: ruski jazik) is an East Slavic language spoken by Rusyns in parts of Central and Eastern Europe, and written in the Cyrillic script. The majority of speakers live in Carpathian Ruthenia, which includes Transcarpathia and parts of eastern Slovakia and south-eastern Poland. There is also a sizeable Pannonian Rusyn linguistic island in Serbia, and a Rusyn diaspora worldwide. Under the European Charter for Regional or Minority Languages, it is recognized as a protected minority language by Bosnia and Herzegovina, Croatia, Czech Republic, Hungary, Romania, Poland (as Lemko), Serbia, and Slovakia.

The categorization of Rusyn as a language or dialect is a source of controversy. Czech, Slovak, and Hungarian, as well as American and some Polish and Serbian linguists treat it as a distinct language (with its own ISO 639-3 code), whereas other scholars (in Ukraine, Poland, Serbia, and Romania) treat it as a dialect of Ukrainian.

== Name ==
In the English language, the term Rusyn is recognized officially by the ISO. Other names are sometimes also used to refer to the language, mainly deriving from exonyms such as Ruthenian or Ruthene (UK: /rʊˈθiːn/ ruu-THEEN, US: /ruːˈθiːn/ roo-THEEN), that have more general meanings, and thus (by adding regional adjectives) some specific designations are formed, such as: Carpathian Ruthenian/Ruthene or Carpatho-Ruthenian/Ruthene.

Within the Rusyn community, the language is also referred to as руснацькый язык, rusnac'kyj jazyk, 'Rusnak language', or simply referred to as speaking our way (Carpathian Rusyn: по-нашому, romanized: po-nashomu).

== Classification ==
The classification of the Rusyn language has historically been both linguistically and politically controversial. During the 19th century, several questions were raised among linguists regarding the classification of East Slavic dialects that were spoken in the northeastern (Carpathian) regions of the Kingdom of Hungary and also in neighbouring regions of the Kingdom of Galicia and Lodomeria. From those questions, three main theories emerged:

- Some linguists claimed that East Slavic dialects of the Carpathian region should be classified as specific varieties of the Russian language.
- Other linguists argued that those dialects should be classified as western varieties of a distinctive Ukrainian language.
- A third group claimed that those dialects are specific enough to be recognized as a distinctive East Slavic language.

In spite of these linguistic disputes, official terminology used by Austria-Hungary that ruled the Carpathian region remained unchanged. For the authorities, the entire East Slavic linguistic body within the borders of the empire was classified as Ruthenian language (German: ruthenische Sprache, Hungarian: Rutén nyelv), an exonym that remained in use until 1918.

== Geographic distribution ==
In terms of geographic distribution, Rusyn language is represented by two specific clusters: the first is encompassing Carpathian Rusyn or Carpatho-Rusyn varieties, and the second is represented by Pannonian Rusyn.

Carpathian Rusyn is spoken in:

- the Zakarpattia Oblast of Ukraine.
- northeastern regions of Slovakia.
- southeastern regions of Poland. The variety of Rusyn spoken in Poland is generally known as Lemko language (лемківскій язык, romanized: lemkivskij jazyk).
- northeastern regions of Hungary.
- northern regions of Romania (in Maramureș).

Pannonian Rusyn is spoken by the Pannonian Rusyns in the region of Vojvodina (in Serbia), and in a nearby region of Slavonia (in Croatia).

In addition to communities in Central and Eastern Europe, Rusyn speakers are found in diaspora settlements across North America (notably in the United States and Canada), Western Europe, and more recently in Australia. In the United States, Carpatho-Rusyn has historically been maintained in religious and cultural institutions, although intergenerational transmission has declined. Estimates of diaspora speakers are difficult because most national censuses do not count Rusyn separately, often subsuming them under Ukrainian, Russian or Slovak categories.

In Slovakia, where Rusyn is recognized as a minority language, the 2021 census recorded nearly 39,000 speakers, although local activists argue that the actual number is higher due to underreporting. In Serbia’s province of Vojvodina, Pannonian Rusyn has co-official status, with around 15,600 speakers according to the 2002 census. Poland records approximately 10,000 Lemko Rusyn speakers, while in Ukraine the 2001 census listed only 6,725 speakers, reflecting the state’s policy of treating Rusyn as a dialect of Ukrainian rather than a distinct language.

== Varieties ==
=== Carpathian Rusyn varieties ===
The main continuum of Rusyn varieties stretches from Transcarpathia and follows the Carpathian Mountains westward into South-Eastern Poland and Eastern Slovakia, forming an area referred to as Carpathian Ruthenia. As with any language, all three major varieties of Rusyn vary with respect to phonology, morphology, and syntax, and have various features unique to themselves, while of course also containing their own, more local sub-varieties. The continuum of Rusyn is agreed to include the varieties known historically as Lemko and Bojko, and is also generally accepted to end at or with the Hutsul variety, which is "not included in the Rusyn continuum per se, but represent[s] a linguistic variant ... better seen as a dialect of Ukrainian". As the westernmost member of the family of East Slavic languages, it has also acquired a number of West Slavic features—unique to East Slavic languages—due to prolonged contact with the coterritorial languages of Polish and Slovak.

=== Literary languages ===
Today, there are three formally codified Rusyn literary varieties and one de facto (Subcarpathian Rusyn). These varieties reflect the culmination of nearly two centuries of activist and academic labor, during which a literary Rusyn language was desired, discussed, and addressed (time and again) by a dedicated intelligentsia. Linguist Stefan M. Pugh notes, "...at every stage someone was thinking of writing in Rusyn; approximately every generation a grammar of some sort would be written but not find wide acceptance, primarily for reasons of a political nature (and of course logistical practicalities)."

Some of these earlier grammars include those by Dmytro Vyslotsky (Karpatorusskij bukvar' (Note: Rusyn: Карпаторусский букварь)), Vanja Hunjanky (1931), Metodyj Trochanovskij (Bukvar: Perša knyžečka dlja narodnıx škol; (Note: Rusyn: Буквар. Перша книжечка для народных школ.) 1935), and Ivan Haraida (1941). Harajda's grammar is particularly notable for having arrived in the midst of a five-year linguistic fervor for Carpatho-Rusyn. From 1939 through 1944 an estimated 1,500 to 3,000 Rusyn-language publications (mostly centered around Uzhhorod, Ukraine) entered print and from 1941 onward, Harajda's grammar was the accepted standard.

==== Prešov Rusyn ====
In Slovakia, the Prešov literary variety has been under continuous codification since 1995 when first published by Vasyl Jabur, Anna Plíšková and Kvetoslava Koporová. Its namesakes are both the city and region of Prešov, Slovakia—historically, each have been respective centers for Rusyn academia and the Rusyn population of Slovakia.

Prešov Rusyn was based on varieties of Rusyn found in a relatively compact area within the Prešov Region. Specifically, the variety is based on the language spoken in the area between the West Zemplin and East Zemplin Rusyn dialects (even more specifically: a line along the towns and villages of Osadne, Hostovice, Parihuzovce, Čukalovce, Pcoline, Pichne, Nechvalova Polianka, Zubne, Nizna Jablonka, Vysna Jablonka, Svetlice, and Zbojne). And though the many Rusyn dialects of Slovakia entirely surpass the limited set of features prescribed in the standard, this comparatively small sample size was consciously chosen by codifiers in order to provide a structured ecosystem within which a variety of written and spoken language would inevitably (and already did) thrive.

Its orthography is largely based on Zhelekhivka, a late 19th century variety of the Ukrainian alphabet.

==== Lemko Rusyn ====
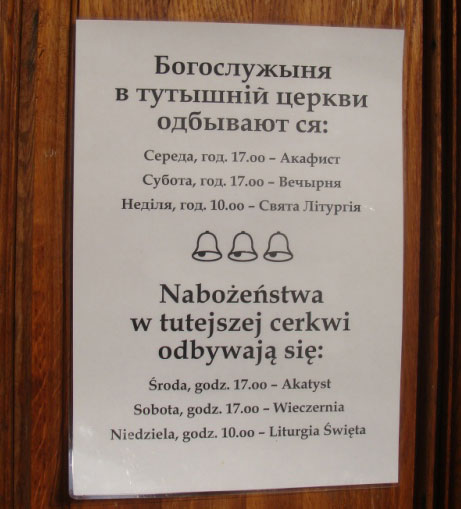
An announcement at the Orthodox Church of St. Volodymyr in Lemko Rusyn language and Polish in Krynica-Zdrój, Poland

In Poland, a standard Lemko Rusyn grammar and dictionary, Gramatyka języka łemkowskiego, 'Grammar of the Lemko Language' (Rusyn: Ґраматыка лемківского языка, romanized: Gramatŷka lemkivskoho jazŷka), was published in 2000 by Myroslava Khomiak and Henryk Fontansky, with a second edition issued in 2004.

==== Subcarpathian Rusyn ====
In Transcarpathia, Ukraine, M. Almašij's and Igor Kerča's Материнськый язык: Писемниця русинського языка, Materyns'kyj jazyk: pysemnycja rusyns'koho jazyka, serves as the de facto literary standard for Subcarpathian, though "unofficial". Published in 1999, with a second edition in 2004, and a 58,000 word Rusyn-Russian dictionary in 2007, Kerča's work has been used by prominent Rusyn publishers in Uzhhorod—albeit with variations between published works that are typical of the spoken language.

===== Common usage =====
Despite the above codified varieties, many Carpatho-Rusyn publications will use a combination of the three Carpathian standards (most notably in Hungary and in Transcarpathia). There have even attempts to revitalize the pre-war etymological orthography with archaic Cyrillic orthography (i.e. usage of the letter ѣ, or yat'); the latter can be observed throughout Rusyn Wikipedia, where even a single article may be written in several different codified varieties. And while somewhat archaic, used of Harajda's grammar is even promoted by some in Rusyn Wikipedia (although parts of the articles are written using other standards).

=== Pannonian Rusyn ===
Pannonian Rusyn, has variously been referred to as an incredibly distinct dialect of Carpathian Rusyn or a separate language altogether. In the ISO 639-9 identifier application for Pannonian Rusyn (or "Ruthenian" as it is referred to in that document), the authors note that "Ruthenian is closest to [a] linguistic entity sometimes called [ Slovak: východoslovenský, Pan. Rusyn: виходнярски, lit. 'East Slovak' ], (Note: Original text: "Vchodnoslovensky [sic] (віходняски)") ... (the speeches of Trebišov and Prešov [districts])."

==== Literary language ====
The literary variety of Serbian and Croatian Rusyns is, again, significantly different from the above three Carpathian varieties in both vocabulary and grammar. It was first standardized in 1923 by G. Kostelnik. The modern standard has been continuously developed since the 1980s by Julian Ramač, Helena Međeši and Mihajlo Fejsa of Serbia, and Mihály Káprály of Hungary.

== History ==
The Rusyn Language in History

One of the dangers of any enterprise like the codification of a language is the desire to 'see' its history go back as far as possible. This danger affects every single language that may have had difficulties in gaining acceptance of its identity ... A good example is Ukrainian itself ... It was not recognized by ... the 19th century ('great') Russian establishment ... leading to a continued perception ... that Ukrainian was a 'dialect' of Russian ... Such treatment invariably led later Ukrainian scholars ... to refer to the language of those [earliest] features as not only 'old' Ukrainian but 'proto'-Ukrainian ... The desire to see the beginnings of Rusyn as existing before, say, the 18th century is entirely natural – it was clearly in evidence in that century, so the beginnings must have been earlier. In fact, it is possible to see linguistic traces of what we recognize as 'Rusyn' in documents in very early texts – but this is not to say that these texts were written in 'Old Rusyn'. It is safe to say that Rusyn begins to be quite recognizable in a more systematic fashion (in terms of modern Rusyn) by the 18th century. Of course, given the political and social histories of the region, and especially religious history, documents differ according to the region, time, and the (socio-)linguistic milieu in which they were composed – e.g., Church Slavonic, Russian, Latin, etc.

— S. M. Pugh, The Rusyn Language, 2009

The Niagovo Postilla, dated to 1758, is one of the earliest texts possessing significant phonetic and morphological characteristics of modern Rusyn (specifically the Subcarpathian variant) and is potentially "linguistically traceable" to the 16th century.

By the 18th century, the Rusyn language was "clearly in evidence" and "quite recognizable in a more systematic fashion".

The first books produced exclusively for Rusyn readership were printed under the direction of bishop of Mukachevo, Joseph Decamillis (r. 1690 – 1706). Under his direction, the printshop at the University of Trnava published a catechism (Katekhisis dlia naouki Ouhorouskim liudem, 1698) and an elementary language primer (Boukvar’ iazyka slaven’ska, 1699). For decades, these would be the only textbooks available to Rusyn students.

Later, in 1767 Maria Theresa's Urbarium was published throughout the Habsburg Empire in a variety of languages, including Rusyn.

Finally, under Bishop Andriy Bachynskyi's tenure (r. 1773 – 1809) in the Greek Catholic Eparchy of Mukachevo, new texts for Rusyn student readership were published. These several editions of the primer and catechism by Ioann Kutka were published in Rusyn vernacular, though with heavy influence from Church Slavonic.

=== 19th century ===
By the 19th century, "attempts to write in a form of Russo-Church Slavonic with a Rusyn flavor, or a type of 'Subcarpathian Russian' with Rusyn phonetic features," began to be made. Notably, a grammar of the Subcarpathian variety of Church Slavonic authored by Mykhayl Luchkai, Grammatica Slavo-Ruthena, of 1830 had a "distinctly Rusyn flavor". And while Lučkaj did not support use of vernacular as a literary language (commenting on the proper usage of either lingua eruditorum et Communis plebis, 'the languages of the learned and the languages of the common people' in his Praefatio), he did include examples of "Rusyn paradigms" in his work to attempt demonstrate its similarity to Church Slavonic. Lučkaj in effect sought to prove the two languages were close sisters of a common ancestor.

In 1847, Greek Catholic priest Alexander Dukhnovych published the first textbook written almost fully in common Rusyn vernacular, Knyzhytsia chytalnaia dlia nachynaiushchykh (A Reader for Beginners). Further editions of the primer followed in 1850 and 1852, as well as the establishment of "the first Carpatho-Rusyn cultural organization", the Prešov Literary Society, in 1850. Over the next four years of its existence, the Society would go on to publish a further 12 works, including Dukhnovych's Virtue is More Important than Riches (the very first play written in Carpatho-Rusyn), as well Carpatho-Rusyn's first literary anthologies in 1850, 1851, and 1852, titled Greetings to the Rusyns.

=== 20th century ===
After the dissolution of Austria-Hungary (1918), the newly proclaimed Hungarian Republic recognized Rusyn regional autonomy in Subcarpathian regions and created, at the beginning of 1919, a department for Rusyn language and literature at the Budapest University.

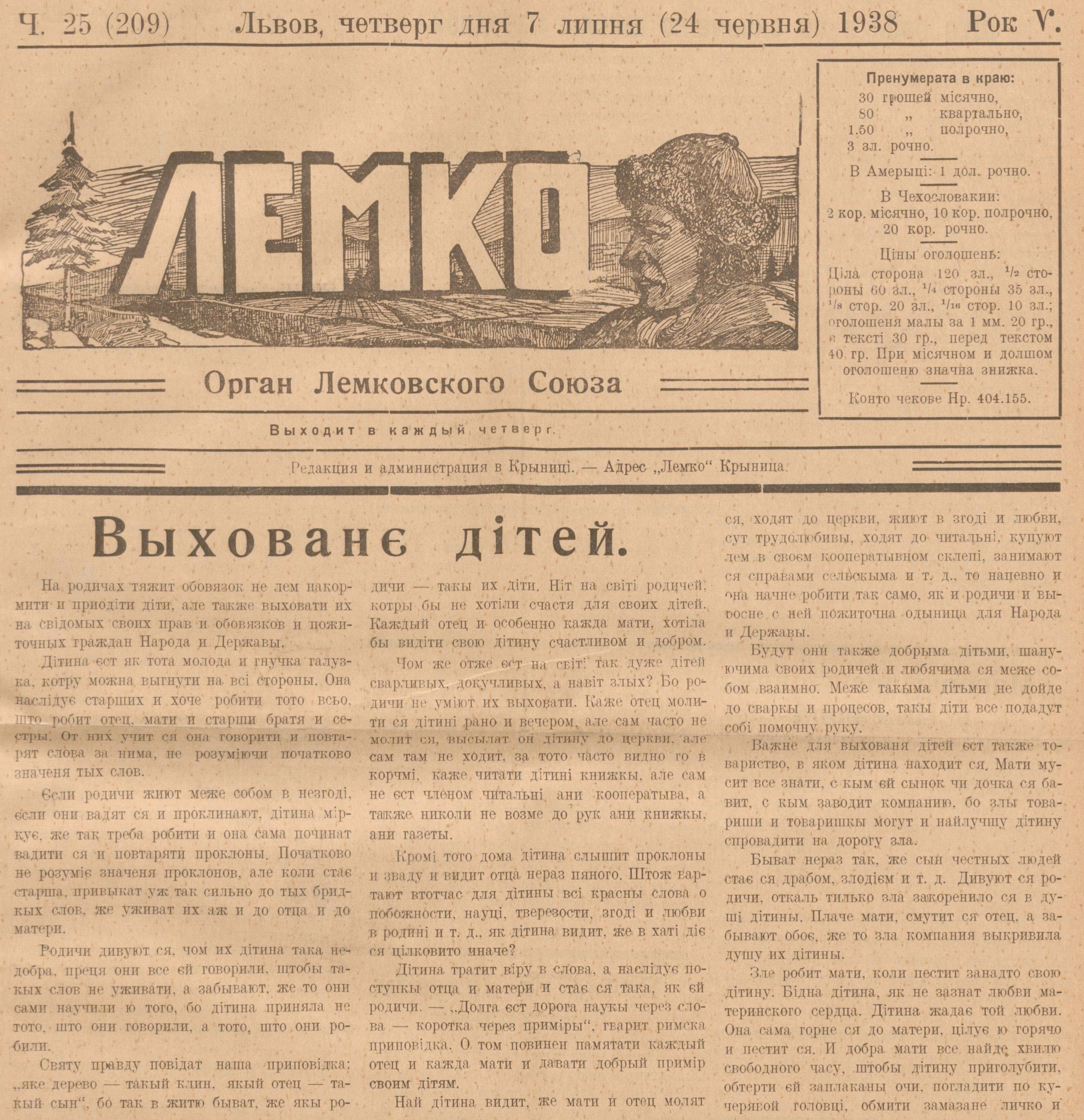
Lemko newspaper issued in Lviv (no 209), from year 1938, with typical Rusyn language features: separation of reflexive pronoun (ся) and words лем, што, котры, уж.

By the end of 1919, the region of Subcarpathian Ruthenia was appended to the newly formed Czechoslovak state, as its easternmost province. During the next twenty years, linguistic debates were continued between the same three options (pro-Russian, pro-Ukrainian, and local Rusyn), with Czechoslovak state authorities occasionally acting as arbiters.

In March 1939, the region proclaimed independence under the name Carpatho-Ukraine, but it was immediately occupied and annexed by Hungary. The region was later occupied (1944) and annexed (1945) by the Soviet Union, and incorporated into the Ukrainian SSR, which proceeded with implementation of Ukrainian linguistic standards. In Soviet Ukraine, Rusyns were not recognized as a distinctive ethnicity, and their language was considered a dialect of Ukrainian language. Poland employed similar policies, using internal deportations to move many Eastern Slavs from southeastern to newly acquired western regions (Operation Vistula), and switch their language to Polish, and Ukrainian at school.

During that period, the only country that was officially recognizing the Rusyn minority and its language was Yugoslavia.

==== Post-Soviet developments ====
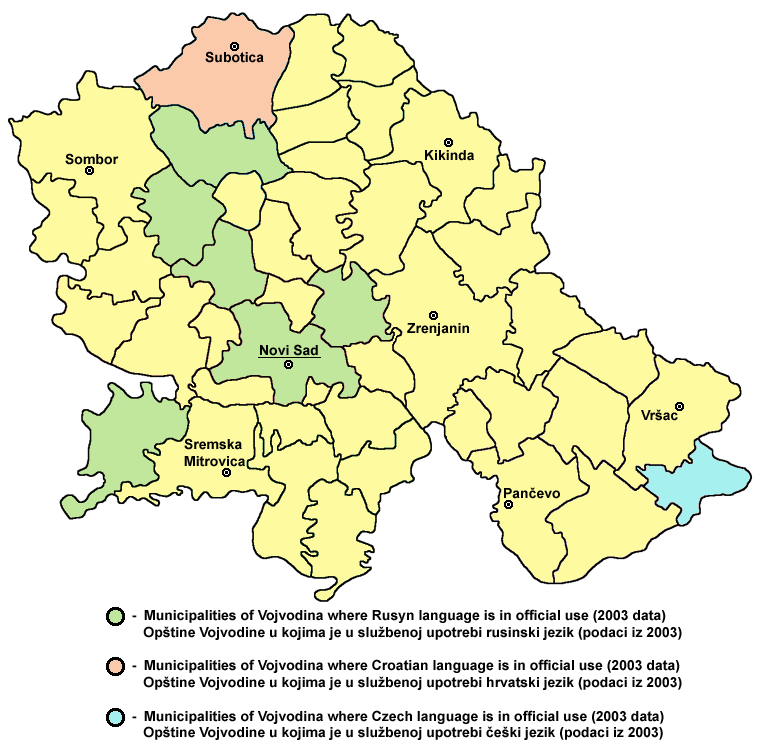
Official usage of Pannonian Rusyn in Vojvodina, Serbia

After the dissolution of the Soviet Union in 1991, modern standards of minority rights were gradually applied throughout Eastern Europe, thus affecting the attitude of several states towards the Rusyn language. As successors of Yugoslavia, Serbia and Croatia continued to recognize the Rusyn language as an official minority language.

Scholars with the former Institute of Slavic and Balkan Studies in Moscow (now the Institute for Slavic Studies of the Russian Academy of Sciences) formally acknowledged Rusyn as a separate language in 1992, and trained specialists to study the language. These studies were financially supported by the Russian Academy of Sciences.

Since 1995, Rusyn has been recognized as a minority language in Slovakia, enjoying the status of an official language in municipalities where more than 20 percent of the inhabitants speak Rusyn.

=== Contemporary status ===
Ukrainian state authorities do not recognize Rusyns as a separate ethnicity, regardless of Rusyn self-identification. Ukraine officially considered Rusyn a dialect of Ukrainian. In 2012, Ukraine adopted a new law, recognizing Rusyn as one of several minority and regional languages, but that law was revoked in 2014.

Rusyn is recognized as an officially protected, minority language by the European Charter for Regional or Minority Languages in Bosnia and Herzegovina (2011), Croatia (1997), Hungary (1998), Romania (2008), Poland (as Lemko, 2009), Serbia (2006), and Slovakia (2002).

It is not possible to estimate accurately the number of fluent speakers of Rusyn; however, their number is estimated to be in the tens of thousands.

==== ISO 639-9 Identifiers ====
The International Organization for Standardization (ISO) has assigned the ISO 639-3 code 'rue' for Carpathian Rusyn.

In 2022, the ISO 639-3 identifier, rsk, and language names, Rusyn and Ruthenian, were approved for Pannonian Rusyn by ISO. The change followed request in 2020 by a group of linguists (including Aleksandr Dulichenko) in which ISO was asked to recognize Pannonian Rusyn as distinct and separate from Carpathian Rusyn and to issue it the new ISO 639-3 identifier, Ruthenian language (with the additional name, Rusnak).

This ISO update is the latest development since a 2019 proposal from a smaller group of those same linguists which similarly requested suppression of the code, rue, and division of Rusyn language into two distinct languages: the East Rusyn language (Carpathian Rusyn) and the South Rusyn language (Pannonian Rusyn). However, in 2020, ISO authorities rejected the request.

As explained earlier, term Ruthenian language already has a specific and well-established meaning. However, the additional term, Rusnak, also has a wider connotation as it is a traditional endonym for all Rusyns (whether in Pannonia or Carpathian Rus'). The effects of the adoption of these terms for Pannonian Rusyn by ISO (if any) remain to be seen.

== Phonology ==
=== Consonants ===
		Labial	Dental/ Alveolar		Post- alveolar		Velar	Glottal
		Labial	hard	soft	hard	soft	Velar	Glottal
Nasal		m	n	nʲ				
Stop	voiceless	p	t	tʲ			k	
Stop	voiced	b	d	dʲ			ɡ	
Affricate	voiceless		t͡s	t͡sʲ	t͡ʃ			
Affricate	voiced		d͡z	d͡zʲ	d͡ʒ			
Fricative	voiceless	f	s	sʲ	ʃ	(ʃʲ)	x	h
Fricative	voiced	v	z	zʲ	ʒ	(ʒʲ)		
Rhotic			r	rʲ				
Approximant	lateral		l	lʲ				
Approximant	central	(w) (Note: The [w] sound only exists within alteration of [v]. However, in the Lemko variety, the [w] sound also represents the non-palatalized L, as is the case with the Polish ł.)				j		

A soft consonant combination sound [ʃʲt͡ʃʲ] exists more among the northern and western dialects. In the eastern dialects the sound is recognized as [ʃʲʃʲ], including the area on which the standard dialect is based. It is noted that a combination sound like this one, could have evolved into a soft fricative sound [ʃʲ].

=== Vowels ===
	Front	Central	Back
Close	i		u
Close	ɪ		ɤ
Mid	ɛ		o
Open		a	

- /ɪ/ and /ɤ/ tend to be more towards centralized as [ɪ̈], [ɤ̈].

== Grammar ==
=== Noun declension ===
Declension in Rusyn is based on grammatical number, gender, and case. Like English, only two types of grammatical number are expressed: singular and plural. And like other Slavic languages, Rusyn has three grammatical genders: feminine, masculine, and neuter. Furthermore, like those languages, Rusyn uses a seven-case system of nominative, accusative, genitive, dative, locative, instrumental, and vocative cases.

One final point of note is that the masculine gender (and only the masculine gender) is further subdivided into animate and inanimate types. While there are no suffixes specific to animacy, declension between the two differs in that for animates, the form of the accusative case copies that of the genitive case.

==== Grammatical cases ====
As mentioned in the preceding section, Rusyn cases are similar to those of other Slavic languages. A very general summary of usage is given in the table below, though proper usage depends on a particular situation, prepositions, and verbs used, as well as other extenuating circumstances.

Cases in Rusyn
Full name (Rusyn)	Case	General Usage
номінатів	nominative	Subjects
акузатів	accusative	Direct objects
ґенітів	genitive	Possession or belonging (i.e. "of" or English possessive suffix -'s)
датів	dative	Indirect objects (i.e. "to" or "for")
локал	locative	Concerning location. Only used with prepositions such as "in", "on", etc.
інштрументал	instrumental	Concerning "means by which".
вокатів	vocative	Used to address another.

Nouns will generally decline differently to indicate each case (e.g. English they/them/their/theirs). Based on how they decline, nouns can be grouped into one of four "types".

- Type I: feminine nouns ending in -а/-я in the nominative singular
- Type II:
  - masculine nouns ending in a consonant in the nominative singular
  - neuter and masculine nouns ending in a consonant or -o in the nominative singular
  - neuters ending in -e or -а/-я in the nominative singular
- Type III:
  - feminine nouns ending in a paired consonant (-cons.+ь), (Note: The terms "paired" and "unpaired" refer to a consonant's use with the soft sign, the letter ь. Consonants that can be palatalized with the soft sign are referred to as "paired consonants", as in the case of н/нь. Others that are inherently hard or soft and never appear with ь are referred to as "unpaired consonants", as in the cases of the letters к or ч.) an unpaired palato-alveolar consonant (-ш, -ч, щ, -ж, or -дж), (Note: Pugh refers to these collectively as "hushers".) or -ов in the nominative singular
  - the feminine noun мати, maty, 'mother'
- Type IV: neuter nouns ending in -а/-я in the nominative singular

==== Declension type I: feminines ending in -а/-я ====
This type consists of grammatically feminine nouns ending in -а (hard) or -я (soft) in the nominative case. The table below includes four examples of such nouns. The first two represent the archetypal feminine paradigm, while the second two represent a "common" or "two-fold gender" paradigm.

This second paradigm has atypical dative, locative, and instrumental singular suffixes which are actually representative of the male/neuter declension paradigm (visible later in this article). According to Pugh, this peculiarity developed as a result of the societal roles of "judge" and "elder" being traditionally patriarchal. This phenomenon is in contrast to grammatically feminine nouns of ambiguous gender where a particular role was not historically male-oriented, such as сирота, orphan. In these cases, the typical feminine paradigm is maintained.

Feminine Nouns Ending in -а/-я in the Nominative Singular
		Archetypal Feminine		Common/Two-Fold Gender	
		Hard	Soft	Hard	Soft
Sg.	Nominative	школа	земля	староста	судця
Sg.	Accusative	школу	землю	старосту	судцю
Sg.	Genitive	школы	землї	старосты	судцї
Sg.	Dative	школї	землї	старостови	судцёви
Sg.	Locative	школї	земли	старостови	судцёви
Sg.	Instrumental	школов (Note: -ов is pronounced as in English owe.)	землёв	старостов старостом	судцём
Sg.	Vocative	школо	землё	старосто	судцё
Pl.	Nominative	школы	землї	старостове старосты	судцёве судцї
Pl.	Accusative	школы	землї	старостів	судцїв
Pl.	Genitive	школ	земль	старост старостів	судцїв
Pl.	Dative	школам	землям	старостам старостім	судцям судцїм
Pl.	Locative	школам	землях	старостах старостох	судцях
Pl.	Instrumental	школами	землями	старостами	судцями
English		school	earth	elder	judge

==== Declension type II: masculines and neuters ====
This declension type encompasses a very large set of vocabulary as it contains nouns of both masculine and neuter genders, hard and soft stems, as well as animate and inanimate beings (for the masculine gender).

===== Masculines ending in consonants =====
This declension contains a large amount of identical forms (syncretism) between cases. Depending on the noun, the number of distinct forms may number from as few as 3 to as many as 6. For singular animate nouns, there is a single form for the accusative and genitive cases, as well as a single form for the dative and locative cases. Similarly, singular inanimate nouns share a form for nominative and locative cases.

Masculine Nouns Ending in a Consonant in the Nominative Singular
		Animate		Inanimate	
		Hard	Soft	Hard	Soft
Sg.	Nominative	сын	учітель	стіл	край
Sg.	Accusative	сына	учітеля	стіл	край
Sg.	Genitive (Note: For this declension, nouns may decline with either -u or -a. Use of one or the other depends on whether the concept or object is (very generally) abstract or tangible in nature. For instance, Pugh provides the following examples for the former: "anger, pain, reason, sugar, tea"; and the following for the latter: "table, nose, knife, et al.")	сына	учітеля	стола	краю
Sg.	Dative	сынови	учітелёви	столу	краю
Sg.	Locative	сынови	учітелёви	столї	краю
Sg.	Instrumental	сыном	учітелём	стілом	краём
Sg.	Vocative	сыну	учітелю	столе	краю
Pl.	Nominative	сынове	учітелї	столы	краї
Pl.	Accusative	сынів	учітелїв	столы	краї
Pl.	Genitive	сынів	учітелїв	столів	країв
Pl.	Dative	сынам сынім	учітелям учітелїм	столам столім	краям країм
Pl.	Locative	сынох сынах	учітелях учітелёх	столох столах	краях краёх
Pl.	Instrumental	сынами	учітелями	столами	краями
English		son	teacher	table	area, region

===== Neuters or masculines ending in -o, neuters ending in -e or -а/-я =====
The following table demonstrates the declension paradigm for nouns with hard stems which end in -o in the nominative case. Though there are some masculine nouns in this category, these nouns are predominantly neuter.

Neuter or Masculine Nouns (with Hard Stems) Ending in -o in the Nominative Singular
		Masculine		Neuter
		Inanimate	Animate	Neuter
Sg.	Nominative	домиско	дїдо	село
Sg.	Accusative	домиско	дїда (Note: This follows the typical masculine animate paradigm where the genitive takes the place of the accusative.)	село
Sg.	Genitive	домиска	дїда	села
Sg.	Dative	домиску	дїдови	селу
Sg.	Locative (Note: For the locative case, there are three possible suffixes: -ovy for animates, -i for inanimates (either masculine or neuter), and -u for stems ending in velar or soft consonants.)	домиску	дїдови	селї
Sg.	Instrumental	домиском	дїдом	селом
Sg.	Vocative	домиско	дїду	село
Pl.	Nominative	домиска	дїдове	села
Pl.	Accusative	домиска	дїдів	села
Pl.	Genitive	домиск	дїдів	сел
Pl.	Dative	домискам	дїдам	селам
Pl.	Locative	домисках/ домискох	дїдах/ дїдох	селах
Pl.	Instrumental	домисками	дїдами	селами
English		large house, building	grandfather	village

Neuter Nouns (with Soft Stems) Ending in -e and -а/-я in the Nominative Singular
		Soft in Nominative		Hard in Nominative (Note: Over time, soft consonants before -e have hardened in Rusyn.)	
Sg.	Nominative	условіє	значіня (Note: This suffix changed over time from -e to -a.)	поле	сердце
Sg.	Accusative	условіє	значіня	поле	сердце
Sg.	Genitive	условія	значіня	поля	сердця
Sg.	Dative	условію	значіню	полю	сердцю
Sg.	Locative	условію условії	значіню значінї	полю полї	сердцю сердцї
Sg.	Instrumental	условіём	значінём	полём	сердцём
Pl.	Nominative	условія	значіня	поля	сердця
Pl.	Accusative	условія	значіня	поля	сердця
Pl.	Genitive	условій	значінь	поль	сердець сердць
Pl.	Dative	условіям	значіням	полям	сердцям
Pl.	Locative	условіях	значінях	полях	сердцях
Pl.	Instrumental	условіями	значінями	полями	сердцями
English		condition	meaning	field	heart

==== Declension type III: other feminines ====
All nouns in this type are feminine. The paradigm can be identified by the following suffixes in the nominative singular case: a paired consonant (-cons.+ь), an unpaired palato-alveolar consonant (-ш, -ч, щ, -ж, or -дж), or the suffix -ов. Additionally, the noun мати, maty, 'mother' is also part of this type.

Feminine Nouns Ending in a Consonant and 'Mati'
		Paired Cons.	Palato-Alveolar Cons.		-ов	мати
Sg.	Nominative	тїнь	ніч	мыш	церков	мати/ матїрь
Sg.	Accusative	тїнь	ніч	мыш	церков	матїрь
Sg.	Genitive	тїни	ночі	мышы	церкви	матери
Sg.	Dative	тїни	ночі	мыші	церкви	матери
Sg.	Locative	тїни	ночі	мыші	церкви	матери
Sg.	Instrumental (Note: The declension for all feminine nouns in the instrumental case is the same (-ов) across all declension types.)	тїнёв	ночов	мышов	церковлёв	матїрёв
Pl.	Nominative	тїни	ночі	мышы	церкви	матери
Pl.	Accusative	тїни	ночі	мышы	церкви	матери
Pl.	Genitive	тїней	ночей	мышей	церквей	матерей
Pl.	Dative	тїням	ночам	мышам	церквам	матерям
Pl.	Locative	тїнях	ночах	мышах	церквах	матерях
Pl.	Instrumental	тїнями	ночами	мышами	церквами	матерями
English		shadow	night	mouse	church	mother

==== Declension type IV: neuters ending in -а/-я ====
This declension paradigm is used very rarely. It entirely consists of grammatically neuter nouns. This paradigm can be identified by the -a suffix in the nominative and accusative cases, as well as the appearance of the affix -t- between the stem and suffix in other cases. There is no variation in this paradigm: all nouns decline in an identical manner.

Type IV is predominantly made up of words referring to the young of animals and humans. However, this should not be taken as a hard rule as some nouns which historically declined differently (e.g. вымя, vŷmja, 'udder' and горня, hornja, 'cup, mug'), now decline according to this paradigm instead.

Neuter Nouns Ending in -a and -я
Sg.	Nominative	гуся	гача	вымя/ вымня
Sg.	Accusative	гуся	гача	вымя/ вымня
Sg.	Genitive	гусяти	гачати	вымяти/ вымняти
Sg.	Dative	гусяти	гачати	вымяти/ вымняти
Sg.	Locative	гусяти	гачати	вымяти/ вымняти
Sg.	Instrumental	гусятём	гачатём	вымятём/ вымнятём
Pl.	Nominative	гусята	гачата	вымята/ вымнята
Pl.	Accusative	гусята	гачата	вымята/ вымнята
Pl.	Genitive	гусята	гачата	вымята/ вымнята
Pl.	Dative	гусятам	гачатам	вымятам/ вымнятам
Pl.	Locative	гусятах	гачатах	вымятах/ вымнятах
Pl.	Instrumental	гусятами	гачатами	вымятами/ вымнятами
English		gosling	colt, foal	udder

=== Verbal conjugation ===
Verbs may be divided into two major conjugation types, which may be identified based on the "stem-marker" that appears during conjugation. The infinitive verb forms are often ambiguous and as such, there is no general system that allows an infinitive to be identified as either Type I or Type II. Some infinitive suffixes, however, are unique to at least Type I, i.e. -ути, -овати, -нути, etc. In the following sections, the stem-markers are given in Latin as Cyrillic often obscures the markers in the conjugated forms.

==== Conjugation type I ====
Type I may be divided into several sub-types, the most notable of which are the vowel+j stem-markers: -uj-, -ij-, -yj-, etc. It is important to remember that in the infinitive and some conjugations that the consonant, -j-, is truncated when followed by another consonant, e.g. бісїдув-aj-ty → бісїдув-a-ty.

===== UJ stem markers =====
The -uj- set of verbs can be divided into two groups based the presence of the suffixal markers -ova- or -uj- in the infinitive. The former group representing the overwhelming majority of verbs in this type.

Conjugation of Verbs with -UJ- Stem Marker
		-OVA-		-UTY
		Hard	Soft	Hard
Infinitive		бісїдова́ти	оно́влёвати	чути
Sg.	1st Person (I)	бісїду́ю	оно́влюю	чу́ю
Sg.	2nd Person (you)	бісїду́єш	оно́влюєш	чу́єш
Sg.	3rd Person (he, she, it)	бісїду́є	оно́влює	чу́є
Pl.	1st Person (we)	бісїду́єме	оно́влюєме	чу́єме
Pl.	2nd Person (you all)	бісїду́єте	оно́влюєте	чу́єте
Pl.	3rd Person (they)	бісїду́ють	оно́влюють	чу́ють
English		to speak	to renew	to hear

===== IJ stem markers =====
Verbs with stem formant -IJ- are typically derived from adjectives and thus indicate the acquisition of a given property i.e. зеленый, zelenŷj, 'green' → зеленї́ти, zelenjity, 'to (turn) green'. In the infinitive, these verbs are identical to those of Conjugation II, Type I. However, these two types of verbs are conjugated differently.

Conjugation of Verbs with -IJ- Stem Marker
Infinitive		зеленї́ти	молодїти
Sg.	1st Person (I)	зеленї́ю	молодїю
Sg.	2nd Person (you)	зеленї́єш	молодїєш
Sg.	3rd Person (he, she, it)	зеленї́є	молодїє
Pl.	1st Person (we)	зеленї́єме	молодїєме
Pl.	2nd Person (you all)	зеленї́єте	молодїєте
Pl.	3rd Person (they)	зеленї́ють	молодїють
English		to turn green	to grow young

===== YJ stem markers =====
There are very few verbs in this category, but the members that do belong to it, tend to be commonly used.

Conjugation of Verbs with -YJ- Stem Marker
Infinitive		ви́ти	пи́ти (Note: There are two conjugation schemes given in this table for the verb пити. The first is the codified variant; the second variant is found regularly in common speech.)
Sg.	1st Person (I)	ви́ю	пи́ю, пю
Sg.	2nd Person (you)	ви́єш	пи́єш, пєш
Sg.	3rd Person (he, she, it)	ви́є	пи́є, пє
Pl.	1st Person (we)	ви́єме	пи́єме, пємє́
Pl.	2nd Person (you all)	виєте	пи́єте, пєтє́
Pl.	3rd Person (they)	виють	пи́ють, пють
English		to wind	to drink

===== ЫJ stem markers =====
This conjugation scheme works similarly to the previous one.

Conjugation of Verbs with -ЫJ- Stem Marker
Infinitive		кры́ти	шы́ти
Sg.	1st Person (I)	кры́ю	шы́ю
Sg.	2nd Person (you)	кры́єш	шы́єш
Sg.	3rd Person (he, she, it)	кры́є	шы́є
Pl.	1st Person (we)	кры́єме	шы́єме
Pl.	2nd Person (you all)	кры́єте	шы́єте
Pl.	3rd Person (they)	кры́ють	шы́ють
English		to cover	to sew

===== AJ stem markers =====
The -AJ- stem type has variations within different Rusyn dialects and regions. In the Prešov Rusyn community, the -A(J)- type described below is the predominant conjugational pattern. However, in regions further east within Slovakia and in other Rusyn communities, a full-fledged "AJ" type conjugation exists, resembling the patterns found in the rest of East Slavic.

In the Prešov Rusyn community, the -A(J)- conjugation is recommended for the written system, while the -AJ- type is limited and occurs primarily with specific verb stems like "maj-", "znaj-", and "staj-". Both forms may coexist in speech and writing, but the "A(J)" type is more prevalent in the Prešov dialect.

In Lemko Rusyn, the conjugation system generally agrees with that of Prešov Rusyn; a fully-fledged -AJ- conjugation is limited to the third person singular of only three verb stems: "мати", "знати", and "познати". In Subcarpathian Rusyn, however, the -AJ- type is predominant, and the element "aj" can appear in all persons in the non-past paradigm.

====== A(J) stem markers ======
While this stem type follows a conjugation structure similar to other East Slavic languages, it is completely unique in that -j- (normally in the form of suffixes -ю, -єш, -є, -єме, -єте, -ют) is truncated—except for in the 3rd person plural. The absence of the connector vowel -e- in this conjugation type is a distinctive feature, likely influenced by West Slavic languages. The conjugational pattern is similar to other Slavic languages, particularly Slovak.

This stem type also includes verbs with the suffix -ывати, a suffix which is often found in imperfective verbs.

Conjugation of Verbs with -A(J)- Stem Marker
		-ATY		-ЫVA-
Infinitive		чі́та́ти	ма́ти	одкрыва́ти
Sg.	1st Person (I)	чі́там	мам	одкры́вам
Sg.	2nd Person (you)	чі́таш	маш	одкры́ваш
Sg.	3rd Person (he, she, it)	чі́тать	мать	одкры́вать
Pl.	1st Person (we)	чіта́ме	ма́ме	одкрыва́ме
Pl.	2nd Person (you all)	чіта́те	ма́те	одкрыва́те
Pl.	3rd Person (they)	чіта́ють	ма́ють	одкрыва́ють
English		to read	to have	to discover

===== AVA stem markers =====
This conjugation type is marked by the presence of -AVA- in the infinitive. The conjugation scheme for these verbs vacillates depending on local dialect: sometimes being conjugated as if they were of the previously-discussed -AJ- stem type. A comparison between the two different conjugation schemes is given in the table below. The -AJ- conjugation scheme is preferred by the Prešov standard.

Conjugation of Verbs with -AVA- Stem Marker
		-AVA-	-AJ-	-AVA-	-AJ-
Infinitive		дава́ти		узнава́ти	
Sg.	1st Person (I)	да́вам	даю́	узна́вам	узнаю
Sg.	2nd Person (you)	даваш	даєш	узнаваш	узнаєш
Sg.	3rd Person (he, she, it)	давать	дає	узнавать	узнає
Pl.	1st Person (we)	даваме	даме	узнаваме	узнаме
Pl.	2nd Person (you all)	давате	дате	узнавате	узнате
Pl.	3rd Person (they)	давають	дають	узнавають	узнають
English		to give			

===== A stem markers =====
Conjugation of Verbs with -A- Stem Marker
Infinitive		писа́ти	указа́ти	скака́ти	посла́ти	насы́пати
Sg.	1st Person (I)	пи́шу	ука́жу	ска́чу	по́шлю	насы́плю
Sg.	2nd Person (you)	пи́шеш	ука́жеш	ска́чеш	по́шлеш	насы́плеш
Sg.	3rd Person (he, she, it)	пи́ше	ука́же	ска́че	по́шле	насы́пле
Pl.	1st Person (we)	пи́шеме	ука́жеме	ска́чеме	по́шлеме	насы́племе
Pl.	2nd Person (you all)	пи́шете	ука́жете	ска́чете	по́шлете	насы́плете
Pl.	3rd Person (they)	пи́шуть	ука́жуть	ска́чуть	по́шлють	насы́плють
English		to write	to show	to hop or jump	to send	to strew

===== NU stem markers =====
Conjugation of Verbs with -NU- Stem Marker
Infinitive		верну́ти	привы́кнути
Sg.	1st Person (I)	ве́рну	привы́кну
Sg.	2nd Person (you)	ве́рнеш	привы́кнеш
Sg.	3rd Person (he, she, it)	ве́рне	привы́кне
Pl.	1st Person (we)	ве́рнеме	привы́кнеме
Pl.	2nd Person (you all)	ве́рнете	привы́кнете
Pl.	3rd Person (they)	ве́рнуть	привы́кнуть
English		to return	to become accustomed to

===== Non-syllabic stem markers =====
Conjugation of Verbs with Non-Syllabic Stem Markers
		CCV-ty > CVC-		CCV-ty > CVCC-	CV-ty > CC-		CVC-ty > CC-	CCV-ty > CC-
Infinitive		бра́ти	взяти́	жа́ти	зачати́	вы́няти	де́рти	рва́ти
Sg.	1st Person (I)	беру́	во́зьму	жну	за́чну	вы́йму	дру	рву
Sg.	2nd Person (you)	бере́ш	во́зьмеш	жнеш	за́чнеш	вы́ймеш	дреш	рвеш
Sg.	3rd Person (he, she, it)	бере́	во́зьме	жне	за́чне	вы́йме	дре	рве
Pl.	1st Person (we)	бере́ме	во́зьмем	жнеме́	за́чнеме	вы́ймеме	дреме́	рвеме́
Pl.	2nd Person (you all)	бере́те	во́зьмете	жнете́	за́чнете	вы́ймете	дрете́	рвете́
Pl.	3rd Person (they)	беру́ть	во́зьмуть	жнуть	за́чнуть	вы́ймуть	друть	рвуть
English		to take	to take	to reap	to begin	to draw or pull out	to thrash or whip	to tear

===== Consonant stems =====
Conjugation of Verbs With Stems Ending in Consonants
Infinitive		не́сти	ве́сти	течі́	мочі́	іти́	лячі́
Sg.	1st Person (I)	не́су	ве́ду	течу́	мо́жу	іду́	ля́жу
Sg.	2nd Person (you)	не́сеш	ве́деш	тече́ш	мо́жеш	іде́ш	ля́жеш
Sg.	3rd Person (he, she, it)	не́се	ве́де	тече́	мо́же	іде́	ля́же
Pl.	1st Person (we)	не́семе	ве́деме	течеме́	мо́жеме	ідеме́	ля́жеме
Pl.	2nd Person (you all)	не́сете	ве́дете	течете́	мо́жете	ідете́	ля́жете
Pl.	3rd Person (they)	не́суть	ве́дуть	течу́ть	мо́жуть	іду́ть	ля́жуть
English		to carry	to lead	to flow	to be able	to go	to lie down

==== Conjugation type II ====
===== Y-type I =====
Conjugation of Y(1) Type Verbs
Infinitive		говори́ти	пили́ти	глушы́ти
Sg.	1st Person (I)	гово́рю	пи́лю	глу́шу
Sg.	2nd Person (you)	гово́риш	пи́лиш	глу́шыш
Sg.	3rd Person (he, she, it)	гово́рить	пи́лить	глу́шыть
Pl.	1st Person (we)	гово́риме	пилиме́	глу́шыме
Pl.	2nd Person (you all)	гово́рите	пилите́	глу́шыте
Pl.	3rd Person (they)	гово́рять	пиля́ть	глу́шать
English		to say or speak	to saw (wood)	to muffle, stifle or make quiet

===== Y-type II =====
Conjugation of Y(2) Type Verbs
Infinitive		вози́ти	гаси́ти	гати́ти	пусти́ти	ходи́ти
Sg.	1st Person (I)	во́жу	га́шу	га́чу	пу́щу	хо́джу
Sg.	2nd Person (you)	во́зиш	га́сиш	га́тиш	пу́стиш	хо́диш
Sg.	3rd Person (he, she, it)	во́зить	га́сить	га́тить	пу́стить	хо́дить
Pl.	1st Person (we)	во́зиме	га́симе	га́тиме	пу́стиме	хо́диме
Pl.	2nd Person (you all)	во́зите	га́сите	га́тите	пу́стите	хо́дите
Pl.	3rd Person (they)	во́зять	га́тять	га́тять	пу́стять	хо́дять
English		to take by vehicle	to put out or extinguish	to erect a dam or barrier	to admit or allow in	to go or walk

===== I-type =====
Conjugation of І-Type Verbs
Infinitive		трубі́ти	шелесті́ти	вертї́ти	летї́ти	свистї́ти
Sg.	1st Person (I)	трублю́	шелещу́	верчу	лечу́	сви́щу
Sg.	2nd Person (you)	труби́ш	шелести́ш	вертиш	лети́ш	сви́стиш
Sg.	3rd Person (he, she, it)	труби́ть	шелести́ть	вертить	лети́ть	сви́стить
Pl.	1st Person (we)8	трубиме́	шелестиме́	вертиме	летиме́	свистиме́
Pl.	2nd Person (you all)	трубите́	шелестите́	вертите	летите́	свистите́
Pl.	3rd Person (they)	трубля́ть	шелестя́ть	вертять	летя́ть	свистя́ть
English		to trumpet	to rustle	to drill or turn	to fly	to whistle

===== Palato-alveolar stems =====
Conjugation of 'Palato-Alveolar'-А Verbs
Infinitive		бурча́ти	вереща́ти	лежа́ти	крича́ти	боя́ти ся	стоя́ти
Sg.	1st Person (I)	бурчу́	вере́щу	лежу́	кричу́	бою́ ся	стою́
Sg.	2nd Person (you)	бурчі́ш	вере́щіш	лежы́ш	кричі́ш	бої́ш ся	стої́ш
Sg.	3rd Person (he, she, it)	бурчі́ть	вере́щіть	лежы́ть	кричі́ть	бої́ть ся	стої́ть
Pl.	1st Person (we)	бурчі́ме	вере́щіме	лежыме́	кричіме́	боїме́ ся	стої́ме
Pl.	2nd Person (you all)	бурчі́те	вере́щіте	лежыте́	кричіте́	боїте́ ся	стої́те
Pl.	3rd Person (they)	бурча́ть	вере́щать	лежа́ть	крича́ть	боя́ть ся	стоя́ть
English		to mutter	to screech or squeal	to lie on something	to scream	to fear	to stand

==== Irregular verbs ====
Conjugation of Irregular Verbs
Infinitive		ї́сти	дати́	бы́ти	пові́сти
Sg.	1st Person (I)	їм	дам	єм	пові́м
Sg.	2nd Person (you)	їш	даш	єсь	пові́ш
Sg.	3rd Person (he, she, it)	їсть	дасть	є	пові́сть
Pl.	1st Person (we)	їме́	даме́	сьме	повіме́
Pl.	2nd Person (you all)	їсте́	дате́, дасте́	сьте	повісте́
Pl.	3rd Person (they)	їдя́ть	даду́ть	суть	повідя́ть
English		to eat	to give	to be	to tell

== Orthography ==
Each of the Rusyn standard varieties has its own Cyrillic alphabet. The table below shows the Rusyn alphabet of the Prešov Standard, with notes on other varieties. The alphabets of the other Carpathian Rusyn varieties, Lemko Rusyn and Subcarpathian Rusyn, differ from the Prešov Standard in lacking ё and ї. For the Pannonian Rusyn alphabet, see Pannonian Rusyn language § Alphabet.

Romanization (transliteration) is given according to ALA-LC, BGN/PCGN, generic European, ISO/R9 1968 (IDS), and ISO 9.

Letters of the Rusyn Alphabets
Capital	Small	Name	Romanization					Pronunciation
Capital	Small	Name	ALA	BGN	Euro	IDS	ISO	Pronunciation
А	а	a	a	a	a	a	a	/a/
Б	б	бы	b	b	b	b	b	/b/
В	в	вы	v	v	v	v	v	/v/
Г	г	гы	h	h	h	h	ǧ	/ɦ/
Ґ	ґ	ґы	g	g	g	g	g	/ɡ/
Д	д	ды	d	d	d	d	d	/d/
Е	е	e	e	e	e	e	e	/ɛ/
Є	є	є	i͡e	je	je/'e	je	ê	/je, ʲe/
Ё ^{[a]}^{[b]}	ё	ё	ë	jo	jo/'o	jo	ô	/jo, ʲo/
Ж	ж	жы	z͡h	ž	ž	ž	ž	/ʒ/
З	з	зы	z	z	z	z	z	/z/
І ^{[b]}	і	i	i	i	i	i	ì	/i/
Ї ^{[a]}	ї	ї	ï	ji	ji/'i	ï	ï	/ji, ʲi/
И ^{[c]}	и	и	i/y	y	î	i	i	/ɪ/
Ы ^{[b]}	ы	ы	ŷ	y	y	y/ŷ	y	/ɨ/
Й	й	йы	ĭ	j	j	j	j	/j/
К	к	кы	k	k	k	k	k	/k/
Л	л	лы	l	l	l	l	l	/l/
М	м	мы	m	m	m	m	m	/m/
Н	н	ны	n	n	n	n	n	/n/
О ^{[d]}^{[e]}	о	o	o	o	o	o	o	/ɔ/
П	п	пы	p	p	p	p	p	/p/
Р	р	ры	r	r	r	r	r	/r/
С	с	сы	s	s	s	s	s	/s/
Т	т	ты	t	t	t	t	t	/t/
У ^{[d]}^{[e]}	у	у	u	u	u	u	u	/u/
Ф	ф	фы	f	f	f	f	f	/f/
Х	х	хы	k͡h	ch	ch	ch	h	/x/
Ц	ц	цы	t͡s	c	c	c	c	/t͡s/
Ч	ч	чы	ch	č	č	č	č	/t͡ʃ/
Ш	ш	шы	s͡h	š	š	š	š	/ʃ/
Щ	щ	щы	shch	šč	šč	šč	ŝ	/ʃt͡ʃ/
Ю	ю	ю	і͡u	ju	ju/'u	ju	û	/ju, ʲu/
Я	я	я	i͡a	ja	ja/'a	ja	â	/ja, ʲa/
Ь ^{[f]}	ь	мнягкый знак (English: soft sign) or ірь	′	’	'	′	′	/ʲ/
Ъ ^{[b]}^{[g]}	ъ	твердый знак (ір)	″	’	"	–	″	

=== Usage notes ===
1. ^{1} ^{2} Not used in Lemko.
2. ^{1} ^{2} ^{3} ^{4} Not used in Pannonian Rusyn.
3. ^{1} The Pannonian Rusyn alphabet places this letter directly after з, like the Ukrainian alphabet. According to ALA–LC romanization, it is romanized i for Pannonian Rusyn and y otherwise.
4. ^{1} ^{2} In Ukraine, the letters о̄ and ӯ are also used.
5. ^{1} ^{2} The letters о̂ and ӱ are used formally.
6. ^{1} "Soft Sign": marks the preceding consonant as palatalized (soft)
7. ^{1} "Hard Sign": marks the preceding consonant as unpalatalized (hard).
8. Until World War II, the letter ѣ (їть or yat') was used, and was pronounced /ji, ʲi/ or /i/.

=== Number of letters and relationship to the Ukrainian alphabet ===
The Prešov Rusyn alphabet of Slovakia has 36 letters. It includes all the letters of the Ukrainian alphabet plus ё, ы, and ъ.

The Lemko Rusyn alphabet of Poland has 34 letters. It includes all the Ukrainian letters with the exception of ї, plus ы and ъ.

The Pannonian Rusyn alphabet has 32 letters, namely all the Ukrainian letters except і.

=== Alphabetical order ===
The Rusyn alphabets all place ь after я, as the Ukrainian alphabet did until 1990. The vast majority of Cyrillic alphabets place ь before э (if present), ю, and я.

The Lemko and Prešov Rusyn alphabets place ъ at the very end, while the vast majority of Cyrillic alphabets place it after щ. They also place ы before й, while the vast majority of Cyrillic alphabets place it after ш, щ (if present), and ъ (if present).

In the Prešov Rusyn alphabet, і and ї come before и, and likewise, і comes before и in the Lemko Rusyn alphabet (which does not have ї). In the Ukrainian alphabet, however, и precedes і and ї, and the Pannonian Rusyn alphabet (which does not have і) follows this precedent by placing и before ї.

=== Comparison to other Slavic languages ===
Some differences between Rusyn and other Slavic languages written in Cyrillic script:

English	Rusyn	Ukrainian	Russian	Serbian
what	што	що	что	шта
only	лем	тільки	только	само
very	барз	дуже/вельми/бардзо	очень	веома
yet	іщы	ще/іще	еще	још
except	окрем	окрім/крім	кроме	осим
in order to	жебы	щоб	чтобы	да би
we could	могли сме	ми могли б	мы могли бы	могли бисмо

== Sample text ==
(Poland) Lemko Rusyn
Того року одбыла ся уж друга стріча габурскых родаків, котрых на Сільському уряді в Габурі 8. липця 2006, на ридни земли привитал староста села М. Ющік. Щиры слова подякы і гордости за шыриня доброй славы свого села, витаня медже довго невидженыма родаками, спомины давных часив, Габури, родини і традициі были не лем на стрічи родаків, але і на цілим дводньовим культурно-суспільним і спортовим сьвяті, яке ся одбыло під назвом «Габура співає і спортує».

(Slovakia) Prešov Rusyn
Того року ся одбыла уж друга стріча габурскых родаків, котрых на Сельскім уряді в Габурі 8. юла 2006, на роднім ґрунті привитав староста села М. Ющік. Слова до душы, подякы і гордости за шыріня доброго хыру о своїм селі, витаня довго невидженых родаків, споминаня на давны часы, на Габуру, на родину і традіції мали свій простор нелем на стрічі родаків але і на цілій двадньовій културно-сполоченьскій і шпортовій акції, яка ся одбывала під назвом: «Габура співає і шпортує.»

(Serbia) Pannonian Rusyn
Того року ше одбуло уж друге стретнуце габурчанох по походзеню, хторих у Валалским уряду, у Габури 8. юлия 2006. року, на родней груди привитал староста валалу М. Ющик. Щири слова, подзековносц, пиха и гордосц пре добри глас о своїм валалу, витаня длуго нєвидзеней родзини, здогадованя на давни часи, на Габуру, на родзину и традицию, мали свойо место нє лєм на стретнуцох родзини, алє и на цалей дводньовей културно-уметнїцкей и спортовей програми хтора ше одбувала под назву: «Габура шпива и шпортує».

(Ukraine) Subcarpathian Rusyn
Того года ся удбыла друга встріча габурськых родаку, котрых на селищному урядови в Габурови 8. юла 2006, на руднуй земли поздоровив староста села М. Ющік. Слова ид души, дякы ай гордости за поширіня доброї славы свойого села, поздоровліня довго невидженых родаку, нагадованя за давні часы, Габуры, родины ай традіцій мали місто не лем на встрічі родаку, айбо и на ціле двадньовному културно-сполочинському тай шпортовному сятови, котроє удбывало из имньом «Габура співат ай занимат ся шпортом».

(Ukraine) Ukrainian
Того року відбулася друга зустріч габурських земляків, яких на Сільському уряді в Габурі 8 липня 2006 року, на рідній землі привітав староста села М. Ющік. Щирі слова подяки й гордості за поширення доброї слави свого села, вітання довго не бачених земляків, спомини давніх часів, Габури, родини та традицій мали місце не лише на зустрічі земляків, але й на дводенному культурно-суспільному та спортивному святі, яке відбувалося під назвою «Габура співає та займається спортом».

(United Kingdom) English
That year, the second meeting of fellow countrymen from Gabura took place, and the village headman M. Yushchik welcomed them to their native land at the Village Government in Gabura on July 8, 2006. Sincere words of gratitude and pride for spreading the good fame of their village, greetings from fellow countrymen who had not been seen for a long time, memories of old times, Gabura, family and traditions took place not only at the meeting of fellow countrymen, but also at a two-day cultural, social and sports festival, which was held under the title "Gabura sings and does sports."

== See also ==
- Alexander Duchnovič's Theatre
- Eastern Slovak dialects
- Petro Trochanowski, contemporary Rusyn poet
- Metodyj Trochanovskij, Lemko Grammarian
- Iazychie
- Rusyn was added to Minecraft as an interface language option

=== Newspapers ===
- Amerikansky Russky Viestnik (defunct)
- Besida, a Lemko journal
- Karpatska Rus'
- Lem.fm, Gorlice, Poland
- Lemko, Philadelphia, US (defunct)
- Narodny Novynky
- Podkarpatská Rus (Подкарпатська Русь)
- Ruske Slovo, Ruski Krstur, Serbia
- Rusnatsi u Shvetse (Руснаци у Швеце)
- Rusynska besida (Русинська бесіда)

== Sources ==
- Bunčić, Daniel (2015). "On the dialectal basis of the Ruthenian literary language" (PDF). Die Welt der Slaven. 60 (2): 276–289. Archived (PDF) from the original on 24 June 2021.
- "Chart of signatures and ratifications of Treaty 148". Council of Europe. 16 December 2021. Archived from the original on 15 August 2021.
- Csernicskó, István; Fedinec, Csilla (2015). "Language and Language Policy in Transcarpathia between the Two World Wars" (PDF). Minority Studies: Demography, Minority Education, Ethnopolitics. 18: 93–113. Archived (PDF) from the original on 20 January 2022.
- Csernicskó, István; Fedinec, Csilla (2016). "Four Language Laws of Ukraine". International Journal on Minority and Group Rights. 23: 560–582. Archived from the original on 17 February 2022.
- Danylenko, Andrii (2009). "Myxajlo Lučkaj – A Dissident Forerunner of Literary Rusyn?". The Slavonic and East European Review. 87 (2): 201–226. doi:10.1353/see.2009.0132. S2CID 152082970. Archived from the original on 18 February 2022.
- Дуць-Файфер, Олена (2019). "Писма – документы Світового Конґресу Русинів і Світовой Рады Русинів (1991–2019)". Річник Руской Бурсы. 15: 17–89. Archived from the original on 18 February 2022.
- Aleksandr Dmitrievich Dulichenko. Jugoslavo-Ruthenica. Роботи з рускей филолоґиї. Нови Сад 1995.
- Fejsa, Mihajlo P. (2018a). "Verb forms/constructions in the Prešov variant and the Bačka-Srem variant of the Rusyn language". Studia Slavica. 63 (2): 367–378. doi:10.1556/060.2018.63.2.16. S2CID 145920941. Archived from the original on 18 February 2022.
- Геровский Г.Ю. Язык Подкарпатской Руси – Москва, 1995
- Harasowska, Marta (1999). Morphophonemic Variability, Productivity, and Change: The Case of Rusyn. Berlin-New York: Mouton de Gruyter. ISBN 9783110157611. Archived from the original on 24 June 2021.
- Kushko, Nadiya (2007). "Literary Standards of the Rusyn Language: The Historical Context and Contemporary Situation". The Slavic and East European Journal. 51 (1): 111–132. JSTOR 20459424. Archived from the original on 1 September 2020.
- Taras Kuzio, "The Rusyn question in Ukraine: sorting out fact from fiction", Canadian Review of Studies in Nationalism, XXXII (2005)
- Magocsi, Paul R. (1988a). Carpatho-Rusyn Studies: An Annotated Bibliography. Vol. 1. New York: Garland. ISBN 9780824012144. Archived from the original on 27 July 2020.
- Magocsi, Paul R. (1988b). Carpatho-Rusyn Studies: An Annotated Bibliography. Vol. 2. New York: Garland. ISBN 9780880334204. Archived from the original on 2 June 2021.
- Magocsi, Paul R. (1993). "Scholarly seminar on the codification of the Rusyn language (Bardejovské Kúpele, November 6–7, 1992)" (PDF). Revue des Études Slaves. 65 (3): 597–599.
- Magocsi, Paul R. (1995). "A new Slavic language is born" (PDF). Revue des Études Slaves. 67 (1): 238–240.
- Magocsi, Paul R. (1996). "The Rusyn language question revisited" (PDF). International Journal of the Sociology of Language (120): 63–84. doi:10.1515/ijsl.1996.120.63. S2CID 56325995. Archived (PDF) from the original on 24 June 2021.
- Magocsi, Paul R. (2015). With Their Backs to the Mountains: A History of Carpathian Rus' and Carpatho-Rusyns. Budapest-New York: Central European University Press. ISBN 9786155053467. Archived from the original on 8 December 2020.
- Magocsi, Paul R.; Pop, Ivan I., eds. (2005) [2002]. Encyclopedia of Rusyn History and Culture (2. rev. ed.). Toronto: University of Toronto Press.
- Magocsi, Paul R. The Rusyn Language: Recent Achievements and Challenges (PDF). Toronto: University of Toronto. Archived (PDF) from the original on 17 December 2021.
- Moser, Michael A. (2018). "The Fate of the Ruthenian or Little Russian (Ukrainian) Language in Austrian Galicia (1772–1867)". Harvard Ukrainian Studies. 35 (2017–2018) (1/4): 87–104. JSTOR 44983536. Archived from the original on 5 May 2021.
- Moser, Michael A. (2016). "Rusyn: A New-Old Language In-between Nations and States". The Palgrave Handbook of Slavic Languages, Identities and Borders. London: Palgrave Macmillan. pp. 124–139. doi:10.1007/978-1-137-34839-5_7. ISBN 978-1-349-57703-3. Archived from the original on 14 January 2020.
- Plišková, Anna (2007). Rusínsky jazyk na Slovensku: Náčrt vývoja a súčasné problémy (PDF). Prešov: Metodicko-pedagogické centrum. Archived (PDF) from the original on 20 April 2021.
- Plishkova, Anna (2009). Language and National Identity: Rusyns South of Carpathians. Boulder: East European Monographs. Archived from the original on 18 February 2022.
- Pugh, Stefan M. (2009). The Rusyn Language. Munich, Germany: LINCOM GmbH. ISBN 978-3-89586-940-2. Archived from the original on 15 December 2021.
- Renoff, Richard; Reynolds, Stephen, eds. (1975). Proceedings of the Conference on Carpatho-Ruthenian Immigration, 8 June 1974. Cambridge, Mass.: Harvard Ukrainian Research Institute. ISBN 9780916458003. Archived from the original on 24 June 2021.
- Rusinko, Elaine (2003). Straddling Borders: Literature and Identity in Subcarpathian Rus'. Toronto: University of Toronto Press. ISBN 9780802037114. Archived from the original on 15 May 2019.
- Zatkovich, Gregory. The Rusin Question in a Nutshell. OCLC 22065508.
