= Bulgaria–Kosovo relations =

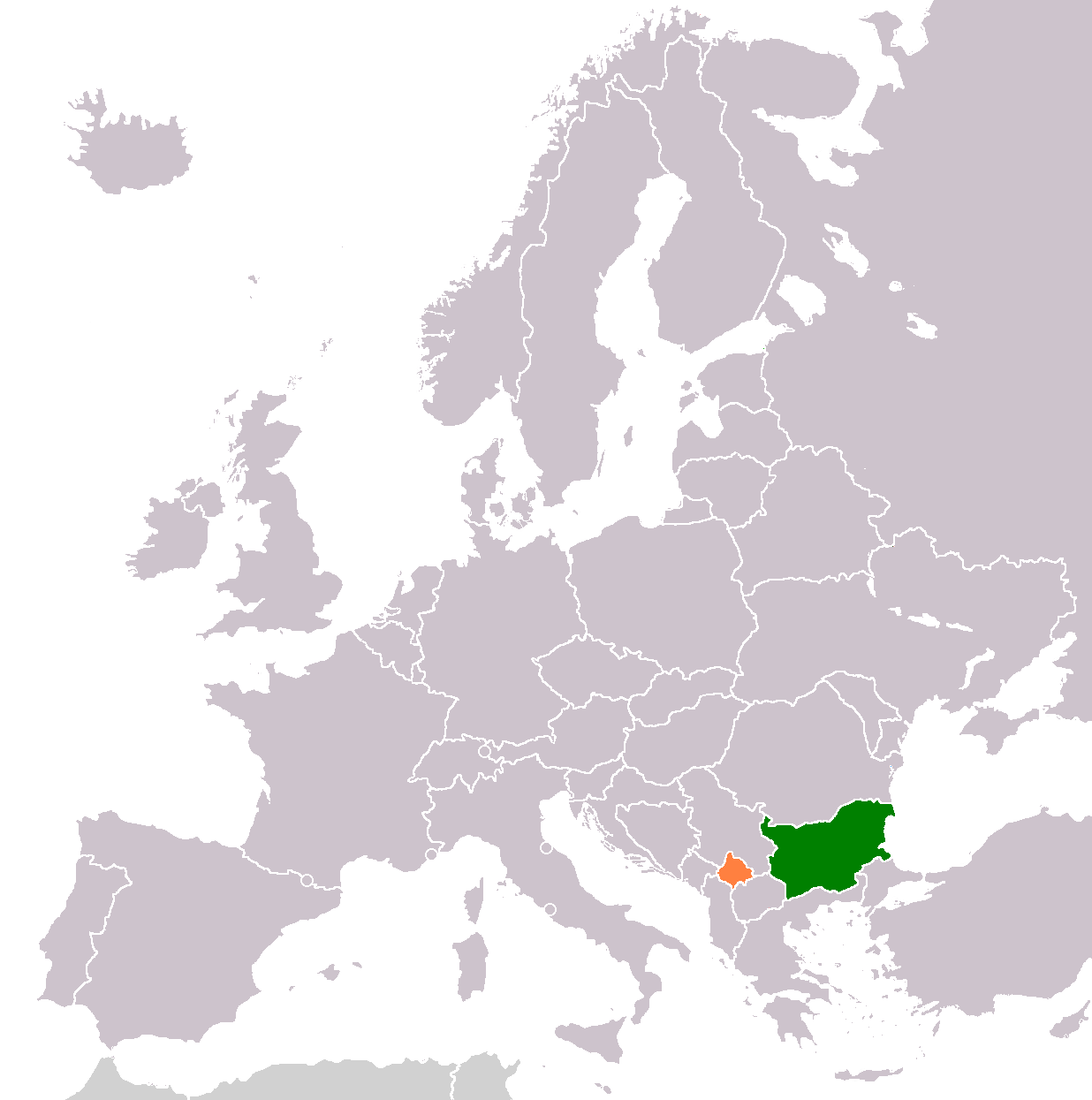

- Bulgaria: Kosovo

Diplomatic mission
- Embassy of Bulgaria, Pristina: Embassy of Kosovo, Sofia

Envoy
- Ambassador Hristo Gudjev: Ambassador Edon Cana

Bulgaria–Kosovo relations refer to the bilateral relations of Bulgaria and Kosovo.

== Relations ==
Kosovo declared independence from Serbia on 17 February 2008 and after an evenly split vote in the legislature, Bulgaria recognised it on 20 March 2008 despite objections from Russia. Bulgaria has an embassy in Pristina and Republic of Kosovo has opened its embassy in Sofia as of January 2010.

Throughout the Middle Ages, Kosovo had been part of the vast Bulgarian Empire.

== Military ==
Bulgaria currently has 100 troops serving in Kosovo as peacekeepers in the NATO led Kosovo Force.

== ICJ ==
Bulgaria supported Kosovo at the International Court of Justice's oral debate on the legality of Kosovo's independence.

== See also ==
- Foreign relations of Bulgaria
- Foreign relations of Kosovo
- Kosovo-NATO relations
- Accession of Kosovo to the EU
- Bulgaria–Serbia relations
- Bulgaria–Yugoslavia relations
- Kosovo, Plovdiv province
