= Lemko (Philadelphia) =

- Publisher: Lemko Association of the United States and Canada
- Founded: 1927
- Ceased publication: 1939
- Language: Rusyn
- Headquarters: Philadelphia
- OCLC number: 20548565

Lemko was a weekly ethnic newspaper, published in the United States in Philadelphia by Lemkos for the immigrant population. It was succeeded by Karpatska Rus'.
