= Karpatska Rus' =

Rusyn-American newspaper

Karpatska Rus' (Карпатска Русь)
- Language: Rusyn, English
- Headquarters: Allentown, New Jersey
- Circulation: 450
- ISSN: 1042-5640
- OCLC number: 16930231

Karpatska Rus' (Карпатска Русь) is a Lemko Russophile ] newspaper published in the United States for the Lemko immigrant community. It is the successor to Lemko, which began publication in 1927.

Originally, the paper was published weekly or twice a week, and was entirely in the Lemko form of the Rusyn language. Its largest circulation was during World War II, when it provided reporting from the war in the Carpathian Mountains. It later added articles in English, and eventually became a bilingual paper. It was still in active publication in 2006, but with a reduced circulation. Since 2008 it has been published in English as a quarterly.

The newspaper had a Russophile orientation, and avoided any suggestion that some researchers consider Lemkos a branch of the Ukrainians as opposed to Lemko being a synonym for Rusyn.
