= Treaty of Neuilly-sur-Seine =

One of the treaties which ended World War I

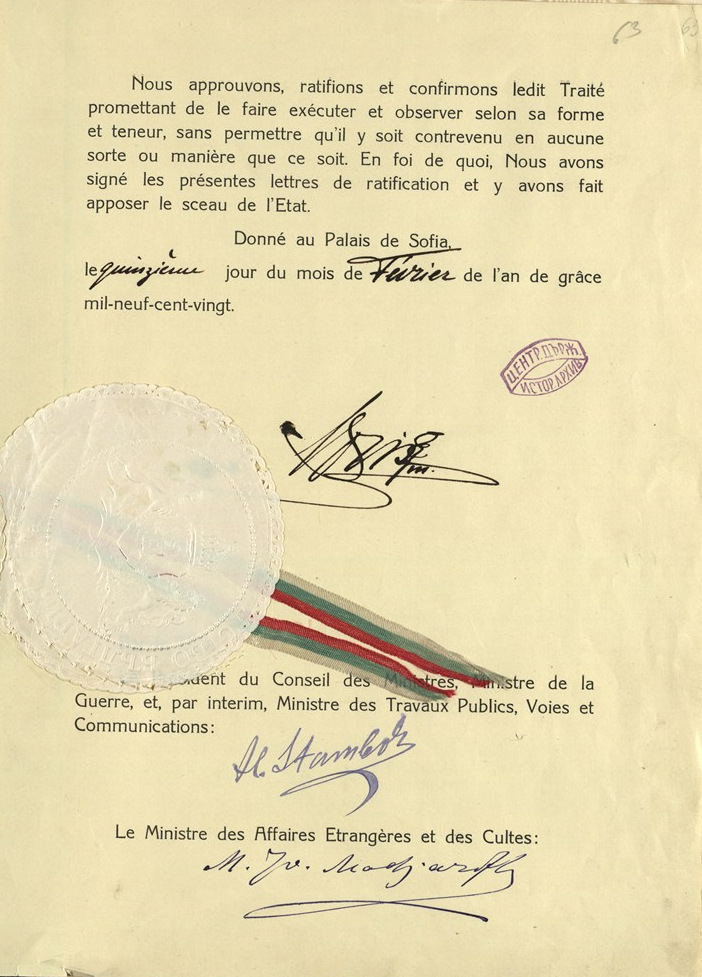
- Ratification of the Treaty of Neuilly-sur-Seine, with signatures of Boris III of Bulgaria, Aleksandar Stamboliyski, and Mihail Madzharov
- Signed: 27 November 1919
- Location: Neuilly-sur-Seine, France
- Condition: Ratification by Bulgaria and four Principal Allied Powers.
- Parties: Principal Allied and Associated Powers: Principal Allied and Associated Powers; United States; British Empire; • United Kingdom; • Canada; • Australia; • South Africa; • New Zealand; • India; France; Italy; Japan; Allied and Associated Powers: Belgium; (Republic of China (1912–1949)) China; Cuba; Greece; Hejaz; Poland; Portugal; Romania; Kingdom of Serbs, Croats and Slovenes; Siam; Czechoslovakia; Central Power; Bulgaria
- Depositary: French Government
- Languages: French (primary), English, Italian

Full text
- Treaty of Neuilly at Wikisource

The Treaty of Neuilly-sur-Seine (French: Traité de Neuilly-sur-Seine; Bulgarian: Ньойски договор, romanized: Noĭski dogovor) was a treaty between the victorious Allies of World War I on the one hand, and Bulgaria, one of the defeated Central Powers in World War I, on the other. The treaty required Bulgaria to cede various territories.

The treaty was signed on 27 November 1919, in Neuilly-sur-Seine in the Hauts-de-Seine department, just west of Paris in France. The signing ceremony was held in the Hôtel de Ville (town hall) at Neuilly.

The Treaty of Neuilly was one of the series of treaties after World War I, which included the Treaty of Versailles, the Treaty of Saint-Germain, the Treaty of Trianon, and the Treaty of Sèvres, which were intended to diminish the military and political strength of the defeated members of the Central Powers.

Like those treaties, the Treaty of Neuilly-sur-Seine contained the Covenant of the League of Nations. As a result the United States did not ratify the treaty.

== Territorial, economical and military concessions ==
Bulgaria after the Treaty of Neuilly-sur-Seine

The treaty required Bulgaria:

- to cede Western Thrace to the Entente (which awarded it to Greece at the San Remo conference) thereby cutting off Bulgaria's direct outlet to the Aegean Sea.
- to sign a convention on population exchange with Greece.
- to cede a further area of 2,563 km^{2} (990 sq mi) on its western border with the Kingdom of Serbs, Croats and Slovenes (later Yugoslavia).
- to return Dobruja, which according to the Treaty of Bucharest was partially ceded to Bulgaria and partially to the Central Powers (who later, on 25 September 1918, transferred this joint condominium to Bulgaria), to Romania, thus restoring the border set by the Treaty of Bucharest (1913).
- to return property removed from the occupied territory liberated by Bulgarian forces to its rightful owners, or to make compensation.
- to reduce its army to 20,000 men.
- to pay reparations of £100 million.
- to recognize the existence of the Kingdom of Serbs, Croats and Slovenes.

== Bulgarian response ==
In Bulgaria, the results of the treaty are popularly known as the Second National Catastrophe. Bulgaria subsequently permanently regained Southern Dobruja as a result of the Treaty of Craiova in 1940. During World War II, together with Nazi Germany, it temporarily reoccupied most of the other territories ceded under the treaty.

== Territories ceded to the Kingdom of Serbs, Croats and Slovenes ==
Four minor regions (historiographically referred to by Bulgarians as the Western Outlands) had been part of Bulgaria from its inception as a principality in 1878, except for the region around Strumitsa, which became part of Bulgaria in 1912. Bulgaria was internationally recognised as an independent country in 1908 and controlled these territories until 1919 when they were ceded to the Kingdom of the Serbs, Croats and Slovenes under the Treaty of Neuilly. The cession of the region was partly a compensation for the occupation of the southern and eastern part of Serbia by Bulgarian troops between 1915 and 1918, and was partly motivated by strategic reasons. The old political boundary between Bulgaria and Serbia followed a chain of high mountain ridges, whereas the new one gave significant military and strategic advantages to the Serbs: it dangerously exposed the Bulgarian capital of Sofia and significantly reduced the military threat to eastern Serbia in case of a Bulgarian invasion (see also Balkan Wars and World War I).

=== Area and population ===
Territories ceded by the treaty to the then Kingdom of Serbs, Croats and Slovenes cover an area of 1,545 km^{2} (597 sq mi) in what is now Serbia and 1,028 km^{2} (397 sq mi) in what is now North Macedonia.

In Serbia, to which the term generally applies in Bulgaria, the territory ceded is split between the modern Serbian District of Pirot (municipality of Dimitrovgrad and smaller parts of the municipalities of Pirot and Babušnica) and District of Pčinja (municipality of Bosilegrad and a small part of the municipality of Surdulica). It also includes a small section along the Timok River in the municipality and District of Zaječar, composed by eight localities (seven populated by Romanians and one populated by Bulgarians).

In 1919, the area corresponded to the following parts of the Bulgarian okrugs: Kyustendil, 661 km^{2} (255 sq mi), Tzaribrod 418 km^{2} (161 sq mi), Tran 278 km^{2} (107 sq mi), Kula 172 km^{2} (66 sq mi) and Vidin 17 km^{2} (6.6 sq mi). Bulgarian sources claim that the Bulgarian population made 98% of the population in Bosilegrad and 95% of the population in Tzaribrod at the time. In the Yugoslav census of 1931, all South Slavs were simply counted as Yugoslavs (Serbs, Croats, Slovenes, Bulgarians) so a comparison could not be made. According to the last Census in Serbia from 2002, Bulgarians made 50% and 71% of population in Dimitrovgrad and Bosilegrad respectively.

== See also ==
- Bulgarian irredentism
- Bulgarians in North Macedonia
- Bulgarians in Serbia
- List of treaties
- Minority Treaties
- Western Outlands
