= Nechválova Polianka =

- Municipality
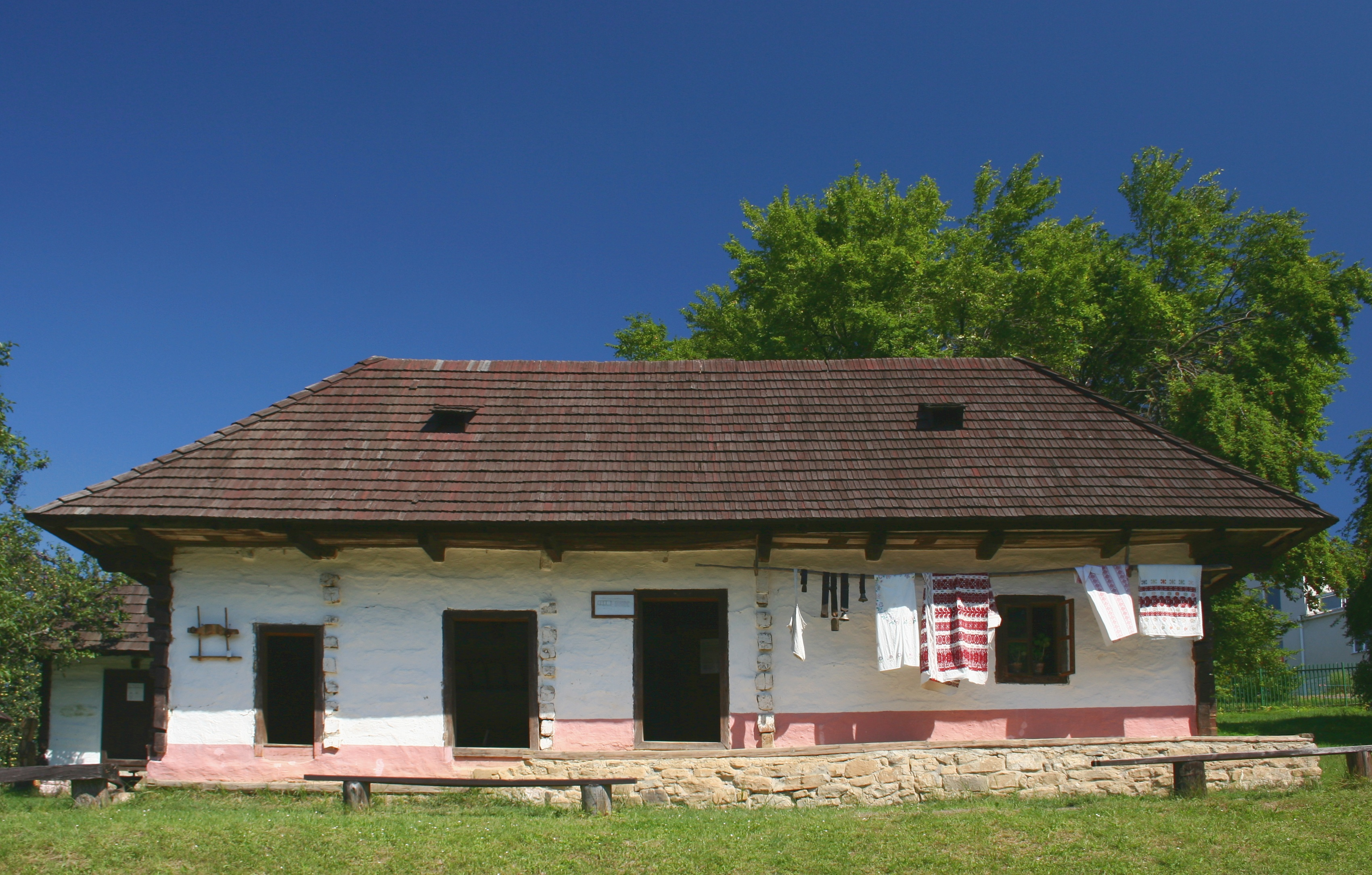

- Flag

- Location of Nechválova Polianka in the Prešov Region Location of Nechválova Polianka in Slovakia
- Coordinates: 49.07°N 22.09°E
- Country: Slovakia
- Region: Prešov Region
- District: Humenné District
- First mentioned: 1547

Government
  - Mayor: Tibor Sisák (SaS, KDH)

Area
  - Total: 12.73 km^{2} (4.92 sq mi)
- Elevation: 294 m (965 ft)

Population (2025)
  - Total: 106
- Time zone: UTC+1 (CET)
  - Summer (DST): UTC+2 (CEST)
- Postal code: 673 3
- Area code: +421 57
- Vehicle registration plate (until 2022): HE
- Website: www.nechvalovapolianka.sk

Nechválova Polianka (Rusyn: Нехвалёва Полянка) is a village and municipality in Humenné District in the Prešov Region of north-east Slovakia.

== History ==
In historical records the village was first mentioned in 1547.

== Geography ==
The municipality lies at an altitude of 294 metres (965 ft) and covers an area of 12.73 km^{2} (4.92 sq mi) (2025).

== Population ==
Population statistic (10 years)
Year	1995	2005	2015	2025
Count	163	127	77	106
Difference		−22.08%	−39.37%	+37.66%

Population statistic
Year	2024	2025
Count	104	106
Difference		+1.92%

It has a population of 106 people (31 December 2025).

=== Ethnicity ===
Census 2021 (1+ %)
Ethnicity	Number	Fraction
Slovak	57	77.02%
Rusyn	43	58.1%
Ukrainian	2	2.7%
Not found out	1	1.35%
Total	74	

In year 2021 was 74 people by ethnicity 57 as Slovak, 43 as Rusyn, 2 as Ukrainian and 1 as Not found out.

Note on population: The difference values of population numbers in the table "Population statistic" and in the sections "Ethnicity" & "Religion" is caused by the use of various statistical methods.

=== Religion ===
Census 2021 (1+ %)
Religion	Number	Fraction
Greek Catholic Church	39	52.7%
Eastern Orthodox Church	20	27.03%
Roman Catholic Church	9	12.16%
Apostolic Church	3	4.05%
None	2	2.7%
Not found out	1	1.35%
Total	74	

In year 2021 was 74 people by religion 39 from Greek Catholic Church, 20 from Eastern Orthodox Church, 9 from Roman Catholic Church, 3 from Apostolic Church, 2 from None and 1 from Not found out.
