= Bulgaria–Serbia relations =

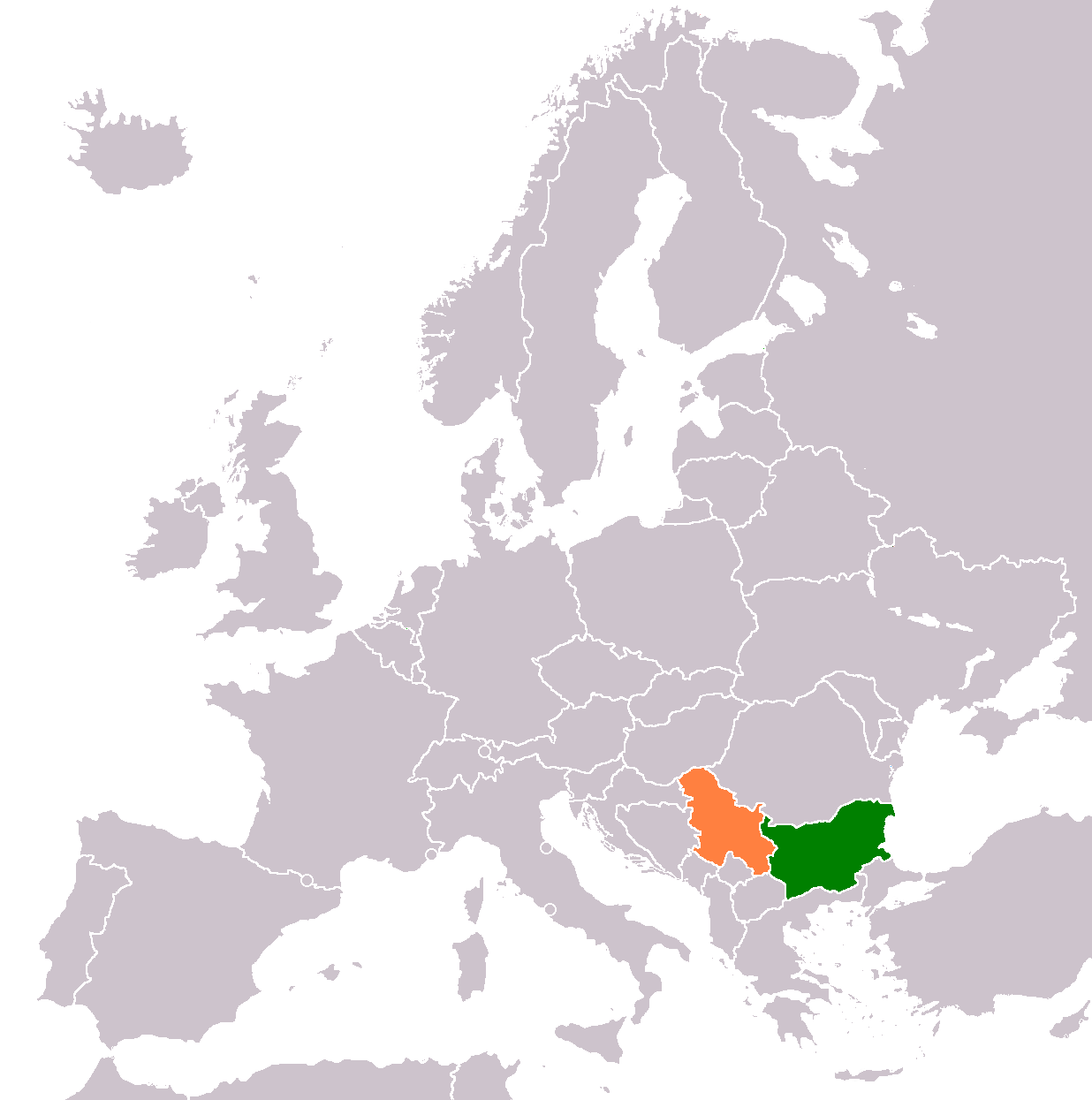

- Bulgaria: Serbia

Bulgaria and Serbia maintain diplomatic relations established in 1879. From 1918 to 2006, Bulgaria maintained relations with the Kingdom of Yugoslavia, the Socialist Federal Republic of Yugoslavia (SFRY), and the Federal Republic of Yugoslavia (FRY) (later Serbia and Montenegro), of which Serbia is considered shared (SFRY) or sole (FRY) legal successor.

== History ==
=== Middle Ages ===
Serbian tribes and the first medieval Serb state were under pressure from two neighbouring empires: Byzantine Empire and the Bulgarian Empire. Numerous wars and attacks by Bulgarian and Byzantine forces for control of the Western Balkans were a constant threat to Serb state until the 12th century.

With the rise of Stefan Nemanja, and especially Stefan the First-Crowned and a further series of rulers from the Nemanjić dynasty in the early 13th century, Serbia increasingly established itself as an equal partner with Bulgaria. However, tensions between the two states never ceased. After the Battle of Velbazhd in 1330 Serbia established a short-lived dominance in the Balkans, which would last until the Ottoman invasion that began in the mid 14th century.

Political marriages between the Bulgarian and Serbian nobility were numerous and frequent. Among the most significant marriages was the marriage of the future Emperor Dušan to the Bulgarian princess, Empress Helena.

=== Ottoman rule ===
With the fall of the Bulgarian Empire to Ottoman rule, a number of Bulgarian scholars moved to the Serbian Despotate. Among them is the most famous biographer of Despot Stefan Lazarević, Constantine of Kostenets. This intellectual immigration left a significant mark on Serbia, especially in the field of language. Constantine of Kostenets was the key figure in the Resava Reform of the Serbian Old Church Slavonic language, which represented a step backwards in relation to the reform of Saint Sava and the approximation of the language to the Bulgarian norm.

With the fall of the Serbian Despotate in 1459, both nations found themselves in the same, subordinate position. The Christian population of Bulgaria and Serbia suffered many reprisals from the Ottoman administration, the most famous of which were the relocation of entire villages and areas from one part of the empire to another, as well as the infamous devshirme. This caused great ethnic mixing in the Balkans, as well as frequent rebellions and banditry.

=== 19th century ===
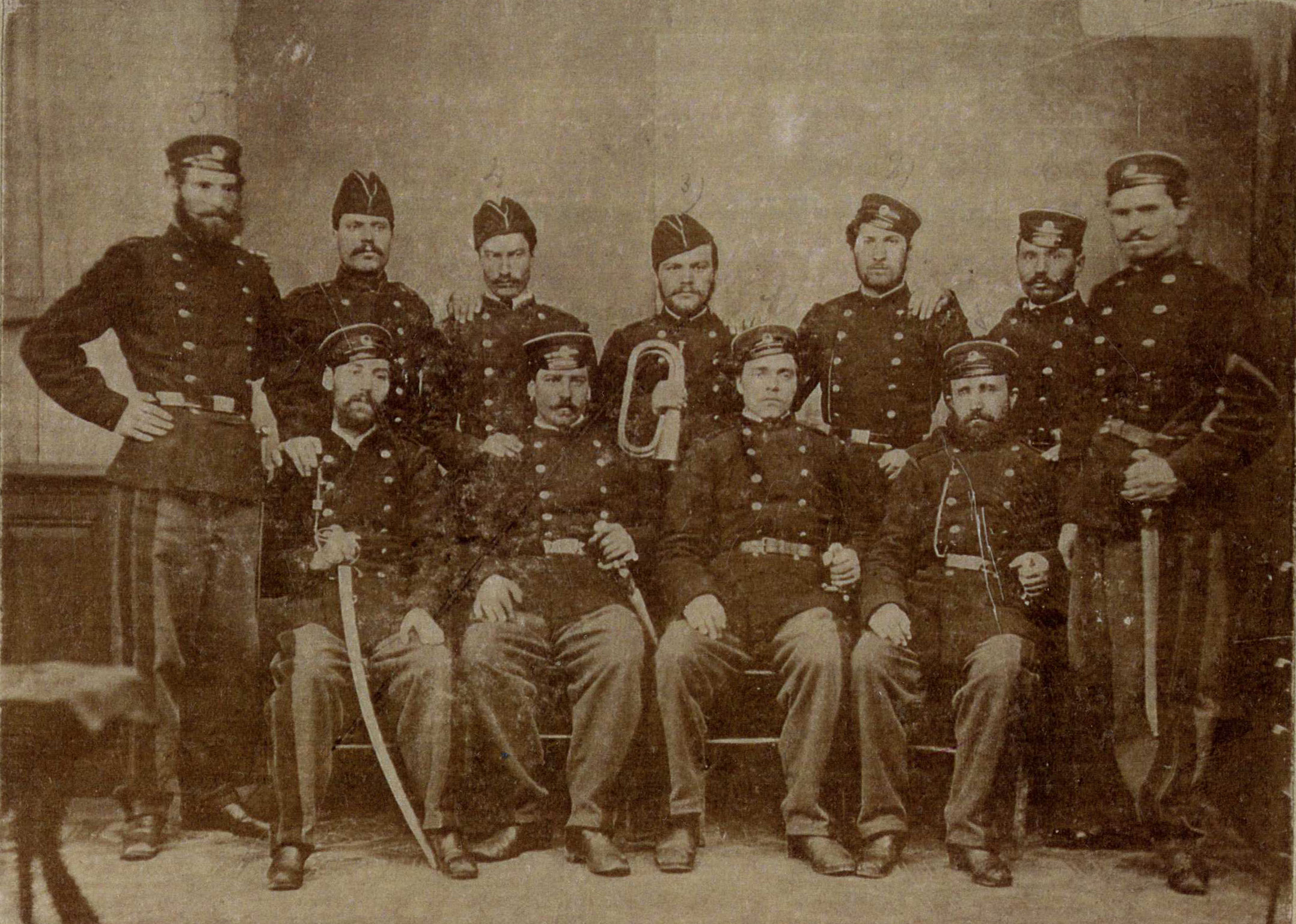
Members of the Bulgarian Legion (Vasil Levski, seated second from the right) in Belgrade, 1868

The two nations concrete liberation actions began in 1804 with the beginning of the Serbian Revolution. Many Bulgarians joined the Serbian rebels. After the Second Serbian Uprising, and especially during the reign of Prince Mihailo Obrenović, Serbia came into close contact with the Bulgarian rebels.

Bulgarian revolutionary Georgi Sava Rakovski was provided shelter in Belgrade, revolutionary publications were printed in the city and Rakovski's armed group joined clashes against Ottomans in Belgrade in 1862. In 1867, a Bulgarian society, active in Bucharest approached the Serbian state with a draft-agreement. The Bulgarian side proposed the founding of a common Serbo-Bulgarian (Bulgaro-Serbian) dual state called South Slav Tsardom, headed by the Serbian Prince. Serbian Prime Minister Ilija Garašanin accepted the Bulgarian proposal in a letter from June 1867, but he diplomatically refused to sign the document, fearing how representative this organisation had been. The establishment of this common state concerned other Bulgarian organisations, which perceived it as an implementation of Garašanin's plan called Načertanije.

At the beginning of the Russo-Turkish War in 1877, which ended with the Liberation of Bulgaria, Serbia joined Russia. The Serbian Army fought along the valley of the South Morava in support of the Imperial Russian Army. In accordance with their merits, Prince Milan Obrenović and Jovan Ristić, the Serbian delegate at the San Stefano Peace Conference, believed that Serbia should receive the territories liberated by the Serbian Army. However, the Russian side had a completely different understanding and decided to create a Greater Bulgaria. According to the Russian Prince Cherkassky, such a Bulgaria should stretch from the Aegean Sea to Ohrid, including Niš, Prizren, and Pristina. This completely revolted Serbia, which felt deceived and taken advantage of, and marked the beginning of Serbian-Bulgarian hostility.

Serbia, led by Jovan Ristić, quickly turned to Vienna and Berlin and their dissatisfaction with Russian domination in the Balkans helped to open the Congress of Berlin, which would revise the Treaty of San Stefano. During this time, Serbia managed not to withdraw its army from the occupied territories until a final decision was made in Berlin. The Congress of Berlin recognized Serbia's international independence and recognized the territorial gains by the Serbian Army. On the other hand, Bulgaria was not recognized as independent, it was divided into two autonomous regions formally within the Ottoman Empire, the Principality of Bulgaria, which became de facto independent, and Eastern Rumelia, and its borders stipulated by the Treaty of San Stefano were significantly reduced, returning much territory under direct Ottoman rule. This solution caused great indignation in Bulgaria.

Despite the controversies of the two peace congresses, relations between Bulgaria and Serbia remained friendly. Diplomatic relations were established in 1879. However, new open issues arose that strained these relations: the rivalry in the Macedonian Question; the territorial dispute arising from the changing of the course of the Timok; the issue of political emigration that took refuge in Bulgaria after the Timok Rebellion of 1883; the growing unpopularity of King Milan in Serbia. These open issues were among several causes of the Serbo-Bulgarian War of 1885.

The immediate cause for the outbreak of the war was the Bulgarian coup in Eastern Rumelia and the proclamation of the Unification of Bulgaria on 6 September 1885 in Plovdiv. On the one hand, Serbia feared that a united Bulgaria would be too strong a rival in the Macedonian region. On the other hand, King Milan wanted to divert the attention of the Serbian public from internal problems with a military victory. This war ended in a decisive Bulgarian military victory and a debacle for Serbia.

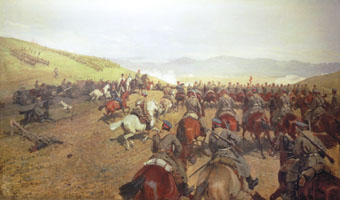
The Bulgarians cross the border in Serbo-Bulgarian War of 1885, painting by Antoni Piotrowski

With the unification of Bulgaria in 1885 and the declaration of its de jure independence in 1908, Bulgaria increased its attention to regaining the territories in Macedonia, assigned under the Treaty of San Stefano. Three young and insatiable nationalisms met in this area: the Greek Megali idea (i.e. the idea of reviving the Byzantine Empire with its capital in Constantinople, which would also include all of Macedonia), the Bulgarian idea of the restoration of the Bulgarian Empire or the realization of the borders from the 1878 San Stefano Treaty (at the time the Macedonians were considered ethnic Bulgarians), and the Serbian idea of Old Serbia. All three sides began a vigorous agitation in the territory of Macedonia at the beginning of the 20th century. Greece worked mostly through the church, in which the majority of the clergy was of Greek origin and which was led by Greeks. On the other hand, Bulgaria and Serbia carried out their agitation through education and lobbying among the middle class in Macedonia. Revolutionary groups soon appeared, fighting on behalf of one of the three sides, and most often these were outlaw gangs that worked for their own interests and terrorized the civilian population of Macedonia.

=== 20th century ===
The Prime Minister of Serbia, Milovan Milovanović, saw that the issue of Macedonia could best and most advantageously be resolved by a pan-Balkan agreement, and especially by an agreement between Serbia and Bulgaria as key actors. Therefore, on behalf of Serbia, he signed the Treaty with Bulgaria on 13 March 1912. This agreement provided for: the expulsion of the Turks from Europe, the expansion of Serbia into Albania and its access to the Adriatic Sea, and the division of Macedonia into a Bulgarian zone which stretched southeast of the line from the summit of Golem near Kriva Palanka to Lake Ohrid and a contested zone northwest of that line, which could be awarded to either country by the Russian Emperor after the war. This treaty was the backbone of the future Balkan Alliance between Bulgaria, Serbia, Montenegro and Greece, which initiated the First Balkan War and drove the Turks from most of the Balkans. During the war, the Serbian Army assisted Bulgaria, which fought the main Ottoman forces in Thrace, by sending forces under the command of Stepa Stepanović to the Siege of Adrianople. As Serbia was eventually denied access to the Adriatic Sea, it aspired to retain the occupied territories in Macedonia in violation of the previously the signed treaty with Bulgaria. Bulgaria then began the Second Balkan War by attacking its former allies, starting with a general night attack by the Bulgarians on the Serbian Army, without a prior declaration of war.

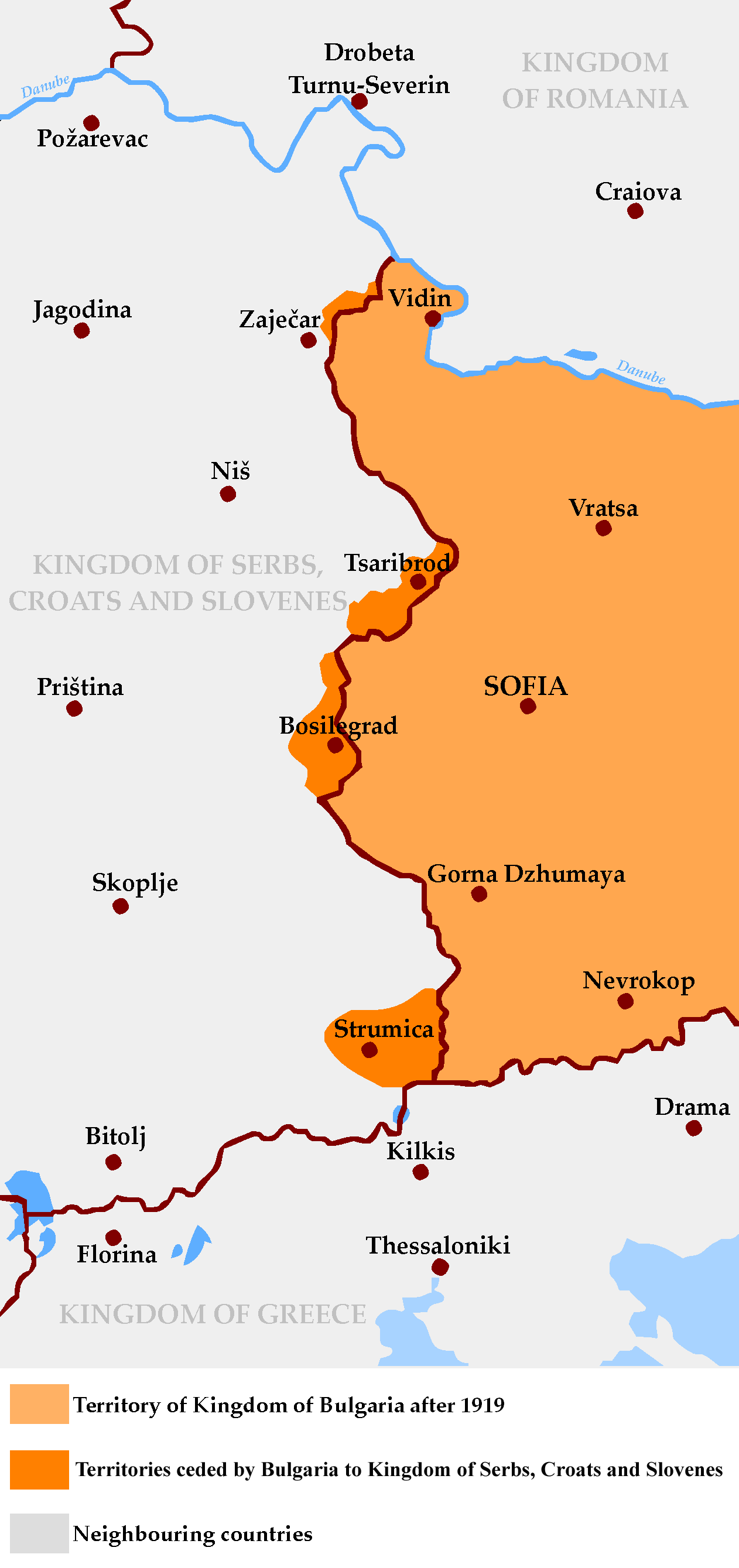
Territories ceded to Yugoslavia by Bulgaria according to 1919 Treaty of Neuilly

Serbia joined the Allies during the World War I, while Bulgaria aligned with the Central Powers, motivated by the promise of territorial gains. This decision was driven by Bulgaria's desire to reverse losses from the Second Balkan War. Bulgaria's entry into the war was a turning point for Serbia. In late 1915, Bulgaria invaded Serbia from the east, coordinating with Austro-Hungarian and German forces from the north. This multi-front offensive overwhelmed Serbia, leading to the collapse of its defenses. The Serbian army, government, and civilians undertook the grueling retreat through Albania to the Adriatic coast, known as the Serbian Great Retreat, with significant loss of life. The Bulgarian occupation of Serbian territories was harsh, involving efforts to assimilate or suppress Serbian populations. The war ended with Bulgaria's defeat in 1918, and Serbia's territorial gains were solidified in the creation of the Kingdom of Serbs, Croats, and Slovenes, while Bulgaria faced further territorial losses under the 1919 Treaty of Neuilly.

The interwar period saw tense relations between Bulgaria and the Kingdom of Serbs, Croats, and Slovenes. The Treaty of Neuilly confirmed Serbian/Yugoslav control over Vardar Macedonia, which Bulgaria continued to claim, viewing it as historically and ethnically Bulgarian. This irredentist stance fueled hostility. The Internal Macedonian Revolutionary Organization (IMRO), a Bulgarian-based militant group, conducted cross-border raids into Macedonia during the 1920s and early 1930s, aiming to destabilize Yugoslav control and promote Bulgarian claims. These attacks, often tacitly supported by Bulgarian authorities, led to frequent diplomatic clashes. Yugoslavia accused Bulgaria of failing to curb the IMRO, while Bulgaria denied responsibility, claiming the group acted independently. In 1934, King Alexander I was assassinated in Marseille by a member of the IMRO. By the late 1930s, relations saw modest improvement. In 1937, Yugoslavia and Bulgaria signed a Treaty of Eternal Friendship, a symbolic gesture aimed at reducing tensions. However, this agreement did not resolve core issues like Macedonia, and mutual distrust persisted.

In 1941, Bulgaria joined the Tripartite Pact, becoming an ally of Germany, Japan, and Italy. German forces then entered Bulgaria to prepare for the invasion of Yugoslavia and invasion of Greece. Bulgaria did not participate in the initial invasion but was granted control over parts of Yugoslav territory, including most of Vardar Macedonia and parts of eastern Serbia. Bulgarian occupation was harsh, involving policies of Bulgarization, which deepened animosity. Yugoslav resistance movements, particularly the Partisans and, to a lesser extent, the Chetniks, fought against Bulgarian forces in these territories. In 1944, as the Soviet Red Army approached, Bulgaria switched sides, declaring war on Germany after a Soviet invasion. Bulgarian troops withdrew from Yugoslav territories, and the Bulgarian Army joined the Allies, including Yugoslav Partisans, in operations against German forces such as the Belgrade offensive and the Syrmian Front.

Post-war relations between Bulgaria and the newly formed Socialist Federal Republic of Yugoslavia were shaped by ideological alignment and Cold War dynamics. While both nations were communist states, tensions persisted. After the war, Yugoslavia emerged as a federal state under Tito's leadership, including the Socialist Republic of Macedonia within its borders. Bulgaria, under Soviet influence, initially recognized Macedonian national identity to align with Yugoslav and Soviet plans for a Balkan federation. In 1946, Bulgaria's leader Georgi Dimitrov and Tito discussed a potential South Slavic federation that would include Yugoslavia and Bulgaria, potentially resolving the Macedonian issue through integration. However, this idea faltered due to mutual distrust and Soviet-Yugoslav tensions. The 1948 Tito-Stalin split, where Yugoslavia broke with the Soviet bloc, drastically altered relations. Bulgaria, loyal to Moscow, became hostile toward Yugoslavia. The Macedonian question re-emerged as a major issue: Bulgaria reverted to denying Macedonian national identity, claiming Macedonians were ethnic Bulgarians. This led to propaganda wars, with Yugoslavia accusing Bulgaria of revisionism and Bulgaria accusing Yugoslavia of suppressing Bulgarian culture in Macedonia. As non-aligned Yugoslavia and Soviet-aligned Bulgaria navigated the Cold War, their relations stabilized but remained cautious. Economic cooperation grew, with trade agreements and joint projects, but political trust was limited. Yugoslavia's non-aligned status gave it leverage to engage with both East and West, while Bulgaria remained firmly in the Soviet camp, limiting deeper cooperation. The Macedonian issue continued to flare up, especially in cultural and academic disputes over history and language.

By the early 1990s, the Socialist Federal Republic of Yugoslavia disintegrated while Serbia, under Slobodan Milošević, sought to maintain a dominant role in a rump Yugoslavia (Federal Republic of Yugoslavia, comprising Serbia and Montenegro). Bulgaria maintained a neutral stance toward the Yugoslav Wars, avoiding involvement in the conflicts in Croatia and Bosnia and Herzegovina. Serbia, increasingly isolated due to international sanctions (imposed in 1992 for its role in the wars), used cross-border trade with Bulgaria as a conduit for goods to Serbia despite sanctions. During the Kosovo War, Bulgaria firmly supported NATO's intervention against Serbia in 1999, allowing NATO to use its airspace and providing logistical support. However, Bulgaria avoided direct military involvement, and no significant bilateral incidents occurred.

=== Contemporary period ===
Bulgaria recognized Kosovo as an independent country in 2008, which strained relations with Serbia.

In 2017, Bulgaria stated it fully supports Serbia's accession negotiations of the EU.

In 2018, Bulgaria and Serbia celebrated 140 years of modern diplomatic relations.

== Political relations ==
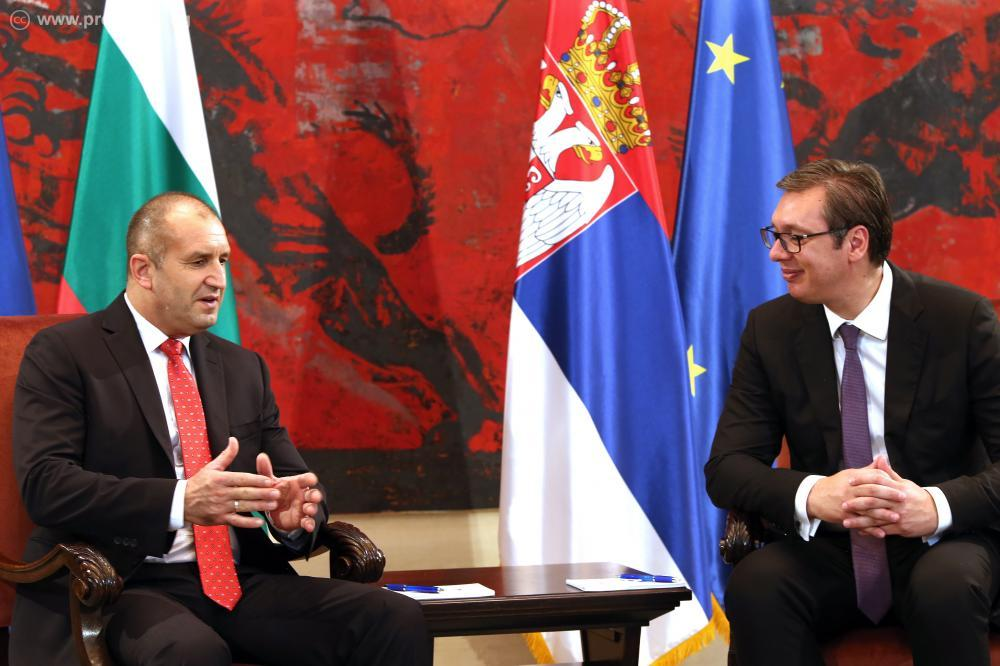
Rumen Radev, President of Bulgaria, and Aleksandar Vučić, President of Serbia, in Belgrade, 2018

Both countries are members of Craiova Group, a cooperation project of Romania, Bulgaria, Greece, and Serbia for the purposes of furthering their economic, transport and energy cooperation. The Group originated in a summit meeting of the heads of governments of Bulgaria, Romania and Serbia, held in 2015 in the Romanian city of Craiova.

== Economic relations ==
Trade between two countries amounted to $1.9 billion in 2023; Serbia's merchandise exports to Bulgaria were about $1 billion; Bulgaria's exports were standing at roughly $900 million.

== Bulgarians in Serbia ==
Bulgarians in Serbia are a recognized ethnic minority group. They number 12,918, constituting 0.2% of the country's population. Bulgarians mainly live in two municipalities along the border with Bulgaria: in Bosilegrad they constitute majority of the municipal population, while in Dimitrovgrad they constitute plurality of population. These territories, referred to as the Western Outlands by Bulgaria, were ceded to the Kingdom of the Serbs, Croats, and Slovenes as a result of the Treaty of Neuilly of 1919.

== Serbs in Bulgaria ==
In 2011, there were 313 local Serbs in Bulgaria, most of whom were descendants of old political emigrants.

== Resident diplomatic missions ==
- Bulgaria has an embassy in Belgrade and a consulate general in Niš.
- Serbia has an embassy in Sofia.
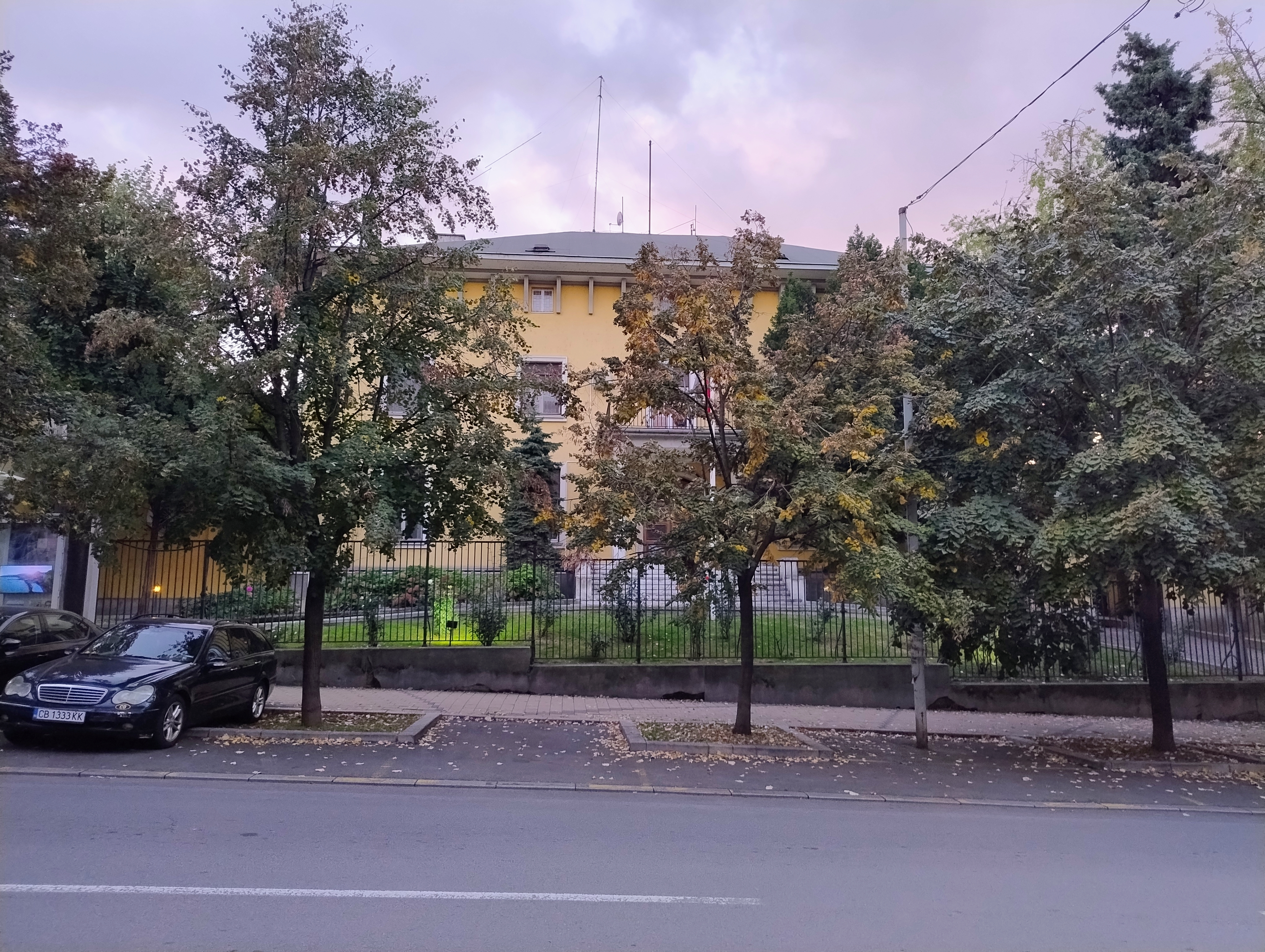
Embassy of Bulgaria in Belgrade

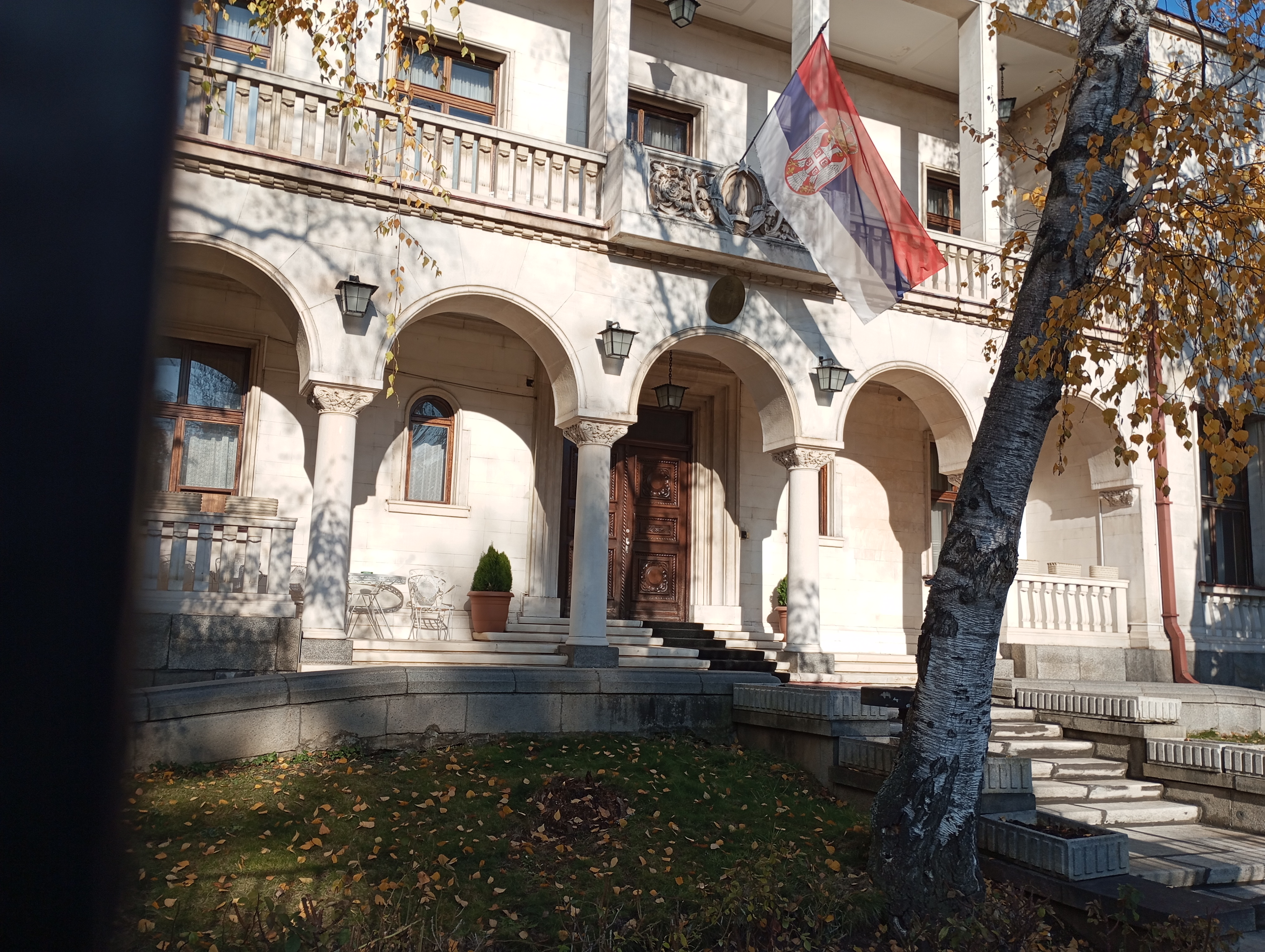
Embassy of Serbia in Sofia

== See also ==
- Foreign relations of Bulgaria
- Foreign relations of Serbia
- Serbia–NATO relations
- Accession of Serbia to the EU
- Bulgaria–Yugoslavia relations

== Sources and further reading ==
- Antić, Dejan D. "A view of Serbian-Bulgarian relations at the end of the 19th and at the beginning of the 20th century." Godišnjak Pedagoškog fakulteta u Vranju 7 (2016): 55–67.
- Ćirković, Sima (2004). The Serbs. Malden: Blackwell Publishing. ISBN 9781405142915.
- Clogg, Richard (1992). "Nation building, the 'Great Idea' and National Schism 1831–1922". A Concise History of Greece. Cambridge; New York: Cambridge University Press. pp. 47–99. ISBN 978-0-521-37830-7.
- Crampton, R. J. (1987). A Short History of Modern Bulgaria. CUP Archive. p. 16. ISBN 978-0-521-27323-7.
- Hering, Gunnar. "Serbian-Bulgarian relations on the eve of and during the Balkan Wars. Balkan Studies (1962) 4#2 pp 297-326.
- Hertslet, Edward (1891). The Map of Europe by Treaty. Vol. IV (1875–1891) (First ed.). London: Harrison and Sons. ( Public domain)
- Marble, S. (2016). King of Battle: Artillery in World War I. History of Warfare. Brill. ISBN 978-90-04-30728-5.
- Nikolov, Alexandar (2011). "Stephen Nemanja and the Foundation of the Second Bulgarian Empire: 1183-1190". Стефан Немања и Топлица: Тематски зборник. Ниш: Центар за црквене студије. pp. 59–69.
- Radojević, Mira; Mićić, Srđan B. (2015). "Serbian Orthodox Church cooperation and frictions with Ecumenical Patriarchate of Constantinople and Bulgarian Exarchate during interwar period". Studia academica šumenesia. 2: 126‒143.
- Rossos, Andrew. "Serbian-Bulgarian Relations, 1903-1914." Canadian Slavonic Papers 23.4 (1981) pp 347–378. and 394-408 .
- Agatonović, Rad. (1899). "Односи између Србије и Блгарске" (in Serbian). Kingdom of Serbia. Archived from the original on 11 August 2014.
- SANU (1993). Balcanica. Srpska Akademija Nauka i Umetnosti, Balkanološki Institut.
