= Bulgaria–Slovenia relations =

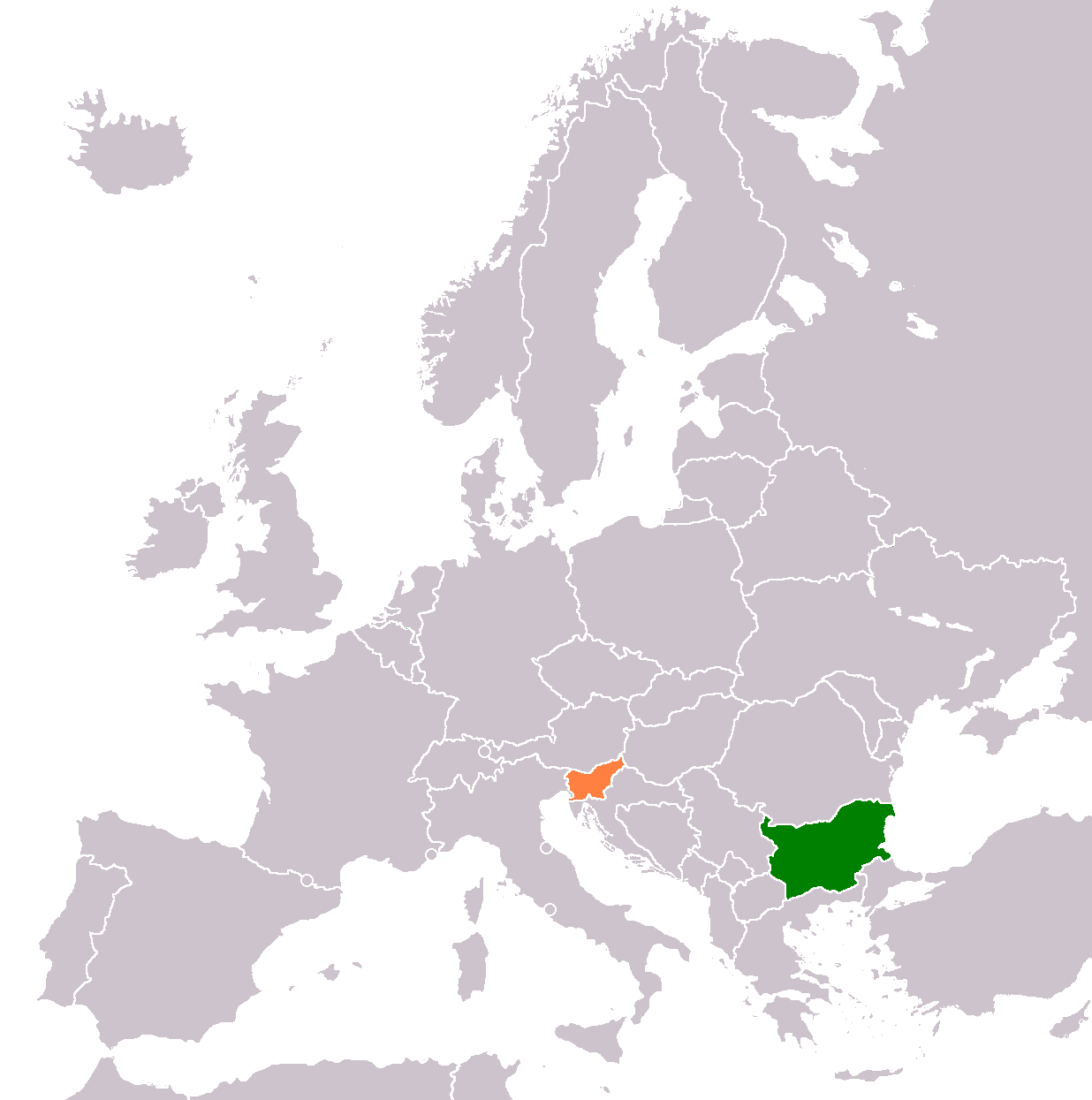

- Bulgaria: Slovenia

Bulgaria–Slovenia relations are the bilateral relations between Bulgaria and Slovenia. Bulgaria has an embassy in Ljubljana. Slovenia has an embassy in Sofia. Both countries are members of the European Union, NATO, Council of Europe, and Organization for Security and Co-operation in Europe.

== NATO ==
Both countries became members of NATO in 2004.

== See also ==
- Foreign relations of Bulgaria
- Foreign relations of Slovenia
- Bulgaria–Yugoslavia relations
