= Status quo state =

Term from power transition theory

Status quo state is a term from power transition theory within the wider field of international relations. It is used to describe states, that unlike revisionist states, see the international system of states, international law and often even free market economics as integral aspects of the international spectrum that should be upheld.

Status-quo states strive to preserve things as they are, whereas revisionists seek to change things in international politics. When scholars categorize states as revisionist or status-quo seeking they are able to explain important outcomes in international politics, such as war and peace.

Generally, there is a direct correlation between a state's hegemony, both political and economic, and its standing as either a status quo state or a revisionist state. Powerful and influential nations in international relations such as the United Kingdom, France and other nations like Japan who have benefited from Western liberalism, are likely to fall under the category of status quos states, while North Korea, Iran, and other nations dissatisfied with their place on the international stage are often considered revisionist states.

== Characteristics of status-quo states ==
A system consisting mostly of status-quo states need not devolve into war. Moreover, if status-quo states recognize each other as such and are not threatened by each other, they should be confronted with fewer cooperation-inhibiting problems (e.g., relative gain concerns) than they would if they feared others' intentions.

In The Origins of Revisionist and Status-Quo States, Davidson mentions that according to the neoclassical realist framework, it points toward "new facts", where they explain that periods of "concert" can occur when all or most states are committed to preserving the status quo. The author also explains this with the example of the Concert of Europe in which states were able to hold those norms and follow those rules because they were status-quo seekers and understood that their neighbors were also committed to the status quo.

Revisionist and status-quo states have been the core of the history of international relations, as the history of great power war and peace may be seen as a series of clashes between revisionists and status-quo seekers. Moreover, status-quo states may ally with the most powerful state in the system if it is also a status-quo state, because they should not fear such a state and because they prefer to have defensive coalitions that are too large rather than too small.
