= Revisionist state =

International relations term

Revisionist state is a term from power transition theory within the wider field of international relations. It describes states whose objective is to change or put an end to the current system.

The term assumes a direct correlation between a state's hegemony, both political and economic, and its standing as either a status quo state or a revisionist state. Powerful and influential nations in international relations such as the United States, France and other nations like Japan that are better placed in the world order, are likely to fall under the category of status quo states while Russia, North Korea, Iran and other nations dissatisfied with their place in the international system are termed revisionist states.

== See also ==
- Polarity (international relations)
