= 2002 Serbian Census =

2002 national census of Serbia

← 1991	1 April 2002	2011 →

General information
- Country: Serbia

Results
- Total population: 7,498,001 (−5.2% (since 1991))

The 2002 Serbian census was conducted on 1 April 2002 by the Statistical Office of the Republic of Serbia. It was the first census held in Serbia after the breakup of Yugoslavia and the last before the separation of Montenegro in 2006. The census counted a total population of approximately 7.5 million.

== Background ==
Following the 1990s conflicts in the Balkans and the dissolution of Yugoslavia, Serbia carried out its first independent census in 2002. The census provided updated demographic data after more than a decade without reliable statistics. Due to political instability, Kosovo was not included in the census count.

== Results ==
=== Population by ethnicity ===
Ethnicity	Population	Share
Serbs	6,212,838	82.8%
Hungarians	293,299	4.4%
Bosniaks	136,087	1.8%
Roma	108,193	1.4%
Yugoslavs	80,721	1.1%
Croats	70,602	0.9%
Montenegrins	69,049	0.5%
Albanians	61,647	0.8%
Slovaks	59,021	0.8%
Vlachs	40,054	0.5%
Romanians	34,576	0.4%
Macedonians	25,847	0.3%
Bulgarians	20,497	0.2%
Bunjevci	20,012	0.2%
ethnic Muslims	19,503	0.2%
Rusyns	15,905	0.2%
Others	32,862	0.4%
Regional identity	11,485	0.1%
Undeclared	107,732	1.4%
Unknown	75,483	1%
Total	7,498,001	

=== Population by religion ===
The census also collected data on religious affiliation:

- Orthodox Christianity – 85%
- Catholicism – 5%
- Islam – 3%
- Protestantism – 1%
- Other or undeclared – 6%

=== Population by language ===
The most common mother tongues were Serbian, Hungarian, Bosnian, Romani, Slovak, Romanian, and Rusyn.

== See also ==
- Demographics of Serbia
- Demographic history of Serbia
