= Černina =

- Municipality
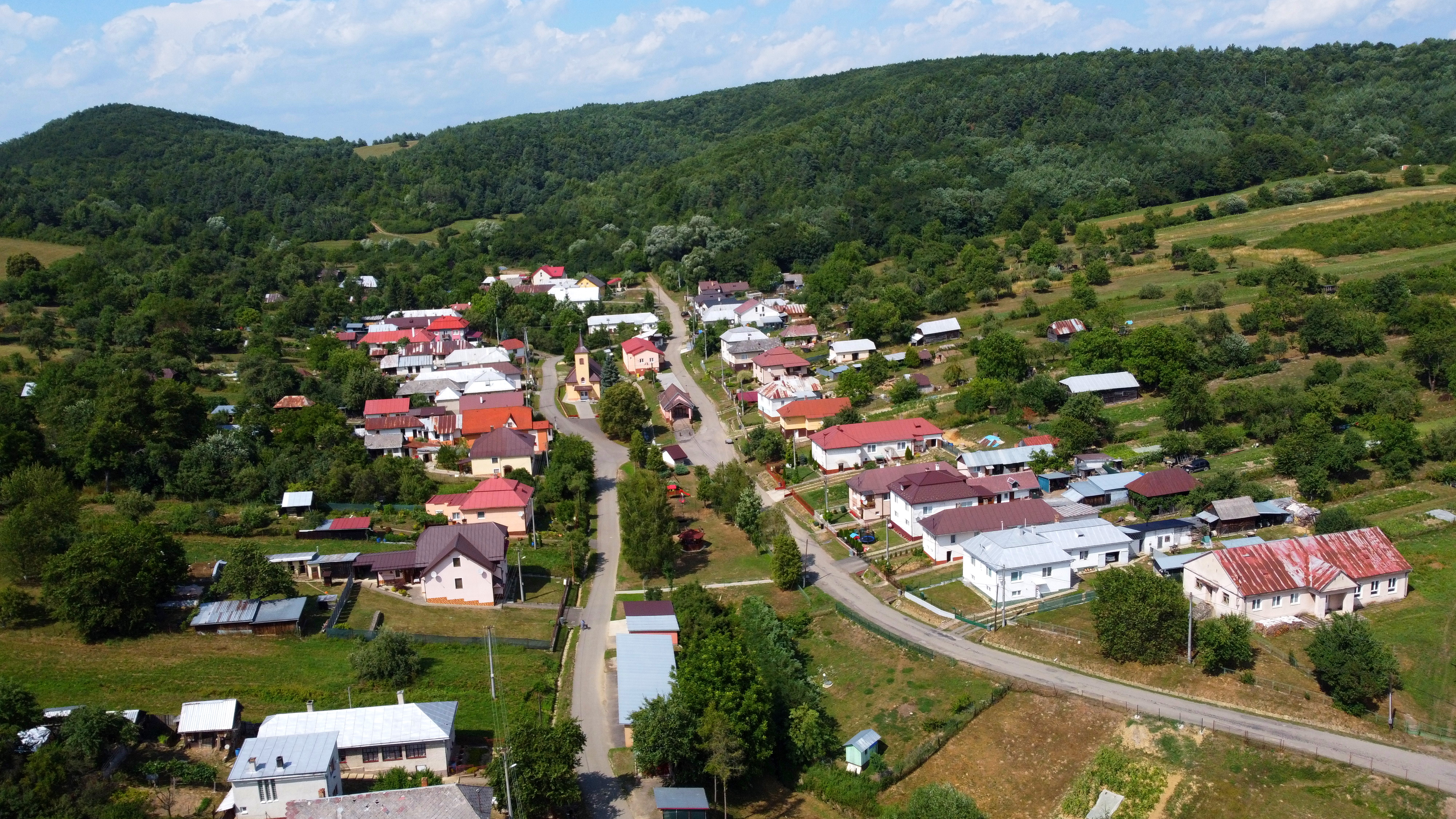

- Flag

- Location of Černina in the Prešov Region Location of Černina in Slovakia
- Coordinates: 49.05°N 21.82°E
- Country: Slovakia
- Region: Prešov Region
- District: Humenné District
- First mentioned: 1492

Area
  - Total: 7.39 km^{2} (2.85 sq mi)
- Elevation: 253 m (830 ft)

Population (2025)
  - Total: 151
- Time zone: UTC+1 (CET)
  - Summer (DST): UTC+2 (CEST)
- Postal code: 672 3
- Area code: +421 57
- Vehicle registration plate (until 2022): HE
- Website: www.oucernina.sk

Černina is a village and municipality in Humenné District in the Prešov Region of eastern Slovakia. The mayor is Silvia Žinčáková (SNS).

== History ==
In historical records the village was first mentioned in 1492.

== Geography ==
The municipality lies at an altitude of 253 metres (830 ft) and covers an area of 7.39 km^{2} (2.85 sq mi) (2025).

== Population ==
Population statistic (10 years)
Year	1995	2005	2015	2025
Count	207	183	177	151
Difference		−11.59%	−3.27%	−14.68%

Population statistic
Year	2024	2025
Count	152	151
Difference		−0.65%

It has a population of 151 people (31 December 2025).

=== Ethnicity ===
Census 2021 (1+ %)
Ethnicity	Number	Fraction
Slovak	153	99.35%
Not found out	2	1.29%
Total	154	

In year 2021 was 154 people by ethnicity 153 as Slovak and 2 as Not found out.

Note on population: The difference values of population numbers in the table "Population statistic" and in the sections "Ethnicity" & "Religion" is caused by the use of various statistical methods.

=== Religion ===
Census 2021 (1+ %)
Religion	Number	Fraction
Roman Catholic Church	142	92.21%
Greek Catholic Church	6	3.9%
Eastern Orthodox Church	4	2.6%
Total	154	

In year 2021 was 154 people by religion 142 from Roman Catholic Church, 6 from Greek Catholic Church, 4 from Eastern Orthodox Church, 1 from Not found out and 1 from Evangelical Church.
